= Collegiate secret societies in North America =

There are many collegiate secret societies in North America. They vary greatly in their level of secrecy and the degree of independence from their universities. A collegiate secret society makes a significant effort to keep affairs, membership rolls, signs of recognition, initiation, or other aspects secret from the public.

Some collegiate secret societies are called "class societies", which restrict membership to one class year. Most class societies are restricted or limited to senior class members and are therefore called senior societies on many campuses. Some include junior class members, hence, upperclass students.

== Categorization ==
There is no strict rule on the categorization of secret societies, although a secret membership role is key. Secret societies can have ceremonial initiations, secret signs of recognition (gestures, handshakes, passwords), formal secrets (the 'true' name of the society, a motto, or society history). Traditional college fraternities or sororities, literary societies, honorary groups, and pre-professional fraternal can have similarly secret rituals but do not keep their membership secret. Some secret societies have kept their membership secret until graduation; others never reveal membership until death. Some, like Skull and Bones at Yale, have published their membership lists in the yearbooks and the Yale Daily News.

One key concept in distinguishing secret societies from traditional fraternities and sororities is that, on campuses that have both kinds of organizations, one can be a member of both. That is, membership is not mutually exclusive. Usually, being a member of more than one traditional fraternity or sorority is not considered appropriate because that member would have divided loyalties. However, typically, there is no issue with being a member of a secret society and a fraternity, because they are not considered similar organizations or competing organizations.

Many secret societies exist as honoraries on one campus and may have been actual meeting societies at one time, kept alive by one or two dedicated local alumni or an alumni affairs or dean's office person who sees to it that an annual initiation is held every year. Some of these state that they are honoraries; others seek to perpetuate the image of a continuing active society where there is none.

=== Common traits ===
There are several common traits among these societies. Historically, most collegiate secret societies were open only to white males, although this began to change in the late 20th century with a greater emphasis being placed on diversity. Many societies also limit their membership to a specific small number and recruit members at the end of their junior year. Most societies maintain secrecy, even at the alumni level, regarding membership, rituals, and traditions. Extensive mortuary imagery is associated with many secret societies, maintaining a pretense of great seriousness. Their clubhouses are often called "tombs", based on a tradition started at Yale University.

=== Transitions ===
Some historically secret societies are now considered honor societies or senior societies. Phi Beta Kappa is the best-known example, where it originally operated on a secret chapter basis, and sometime after its secrets were made public in the 1830s, Phi Beta Kappa continued as an honor society. The membership of honor societies or senior societies is not secret, but their rituals may be.

== History ==
The first collegiate secret society recorded in North America is that of the F.H.C. Society, established on November 11, 1750, at The College of William & Mary. Though the letters stand for a Latin phrase, the society is informally and publicly referred to as the "Flat Hat Club"; its most prominent members included St. George Tucker, Thomas Jefferson, and George Wythe. The second-oldest Latin-letter society, the P.D.A. Society ("Please Don't Ask"), in 1776 refused entry to John Heath, then a student at the college; rebuffed, he in the same year established the first Greek-letter secret society at the college, the Phi Beta Kappa, modeling it on the two older fraternities (see the Flat Hat Club). The Phi Beta Kappa society had a rudimentary initiation and maintained an uncertain level of secrecy. Those secrets were exposed in the mid-1830s by students at Harvard University acting under the patronage of John Quincy Adams. Since the 1840s, Phi Beta Kappa has operated openly as an academic honor society.

The spread of Phi Beta Kappa to different colleges and universities likely sparked the creation of such competing societies as Chi Phi (1824), Kappa Alpha Society (1825), and Sigma Phi Society (1827); many continue today as American collegiate social fraternities (and, later, sororities). A second line of development took place at Yale College, with the creation of Chi Delta Theta (1821) and Skull and Bones (1832): antecedents of what would become known as class societies.

Skull & Bones aroused competition on campus, bringing forth Scroll and Key (1841), and later Wolf's Head (1883), among students in the senior class. But the prestige of the senior societies was able to keep the very influential fraternities Alpha Delta Phi and Psi Upsilon from ever becoming full four-year institutions at Yale. They remained junior class societies there. There were sophomore and freshman societies at Yale as well. A stable system of eight class societies (two competing chains of four class societies each) was in place by the late 1840s.

Delta Kappa Epsilon is a junior class society founded at Yale in 1844. None of the 51 chapters the parent chapter spawned operates as a junior society, but the collegiate fraternity Delta Kappa Epsilon did come from the class society system. Likewise, Alpha Sigma Phi started as a Yale sophomore society and now has 68 chapters; although, again, none of Alpha Sigma Phi's chapters have remained sophomore societies.

The development of class societies spread from Yale to other campuses in the northeastern States. Seniors at neighboring Wesleyan established a senior society, Skull & Serpent (1865), and a second society, originally a chapter of Skull and Bones, but then independent as a sophomore society, Theta Nu Epsilon (1870), which began to drastically increase the number of campuses with class societies. William Raimond Baird noted in the 1905 edition of his Manual that "In addition to the regular fraternities, there are Eastern college societies which draw members from only one of the undergraduate classes, and which have only a few features of the general fraternity system." From Wesleyan, the practice spread more widely across the Northeast, with full systems soon in place at Brown, Rutgers, and other institutions.

Kappa Sigma Theta, Phi Theta Psi, Delta Beta Xi, Delta Sigma Phi, were all sophomore societies at Yale, and the two large freshman societies of Delta Kappa and Kappa Sigma Epsilon lived until 1880. Delta Kappa established chapters at Amherst College, the University of North Carolina, University of Virginia, University of Mississippi, Dartmouth College, and Centre College. Kappa Sigma Epsilon had chapters at Amherst, Rensselaer Polytechnic Institute and Dartmouth. Other class societies existed at Brown, Harvard, Syracuse, Colgate, Cornell, and other Northeastern institutions. At universities such as Colgate University, these secret societies have evolved and morphed over the years.

Theta Nu Epsilon spread to about 120 colleges and universities, but many of its chapters operated as three-year societies where a class-year society was inappropriate.

The proliferation of senior societies across the United States between 1900 and 1930 is attributed to the historical precedent established by such organizations and the influence of Skull & Bones, one of the most prominent class societies of the era. Class societies at the junior, sophomore, and freshman levels are similarly present at numerous campuses throughout the country.

== Individual institutions ==
=== Clemson University ===
Tiger Brotherhood is an honorary service fraternity at Clemson University. It was established in 1924 as a non-secretive student group but soon went defunct. It was reformed in 1928 and encourages standards of social and ethical conduct and a commitment to Clemson. Although most of its members are unknown, former members include two Clemson president—E. Walter Sikes and James Frazier Barker—and Clemson football coach Frank Howard. The university suspended the fraternity for three years in 2017 for hazing.

=== Colgate University ===
Although there have been many underground organizations at Colgate University, the first secret honor society on record is the Skull and Scroll Society, founded in 1908. Members of the Skull and Scroll wore white hats with a black skull and scroll added to them. The Gorgon's Head was founded in 1912 and chose people for traits such as character, distinguished service, and achievement. Its members wore black hats with a golden emblem. These two organizations competed with each other until 1934 when they merged to create the Konosioni senior honor society, now called Tredecim Senior Honor Society. Tredecim is no longer a secret society but is now seen as a leadership society.

=== College of William & Mary ===
The College of William & Mary in Williamsburg, Virginia was home to the first known secret collegiate society in the United States, the F.H.C. Society (founded in 1750). The initials of the society stand for a Latin phrase, likely Fraternitas, Humanitas, et Cognitio or Fraternitas Humanitas Cognitioque (two renderings of "brotherhood, humaneness, and knowledge"), but is publicly nicknamed the Flat Hat Club. William & Mary alumnus and third American president, Thomas Jefferson, was perhaps the most famous member of the F.H.C. Society. The best opinion is that the society did not survive the British invasion of Virginia at the end of the American Revolution. Going dormant during the American Revolution, the society was revived in 1916 as the Flat Hat Club.

William & Mary students John Heath and William Short founded the nation's first collegiate Greek-letter organization, Phi Beta Kappa, on December 5, 1776, as a secret literary and philosophical society. Additional chapters were established in 1780 and 1781 at Yale and Harvard. With nearly 300 chapters across the country and no longer secret, Phi Beta Kappa has grown to become the nation's premier academic honor society.

Although the pressures of the American Civil War forced several societies to disappear, many were revived during the 20th century. Some of the secret societies known to currently exist at the college are: The 7 Society, 13 Club, Alpha Club, Bishop James Madison Society, The Cord, Flat Hat Club, The Spades, W Society, and Wren Society.

=== Columbia University ===
Three secret societies were formed at Columbia University: St. Anthony Hall (1847) and the Nacoms (1898) and Sachems (1915). St. Anthony Hall is now a traditional fraternal organization and literary society that has ten other chapters, notably at Yale, Princeton, and the University of Pennsylvania. The Nacoms and Sachems are senior societies of fifteen members each. Though efforts have been made by the university's student body to force them to abolish their secrecy and register with the administration, efforts have been unsuccessful.

=== Cornell University ===
Cornell University has a long history of secret societies on campus. Andrew Dickson White, the first president of Cornell University and himself a Bonesman, is said to have encouraged the formation of a "secret society" on campus. In the early years, all fraternities were called the "secret societies", but as the Greek system developed into a larger, more public entity, "secret society" began to refer only to the class societies, except for the Sigma Phi Society on campus.

In the early twentieth century, Cornell students belonged to sophomore, junior, and senior societies, as well as honorary societies for particular fields of study. Liberalization of the 1960s spelled the end of these organizations as students rebelled against the establishment. The majority of the societies disappeared or became inactive in a very short period.

=== Dartmouth College ===
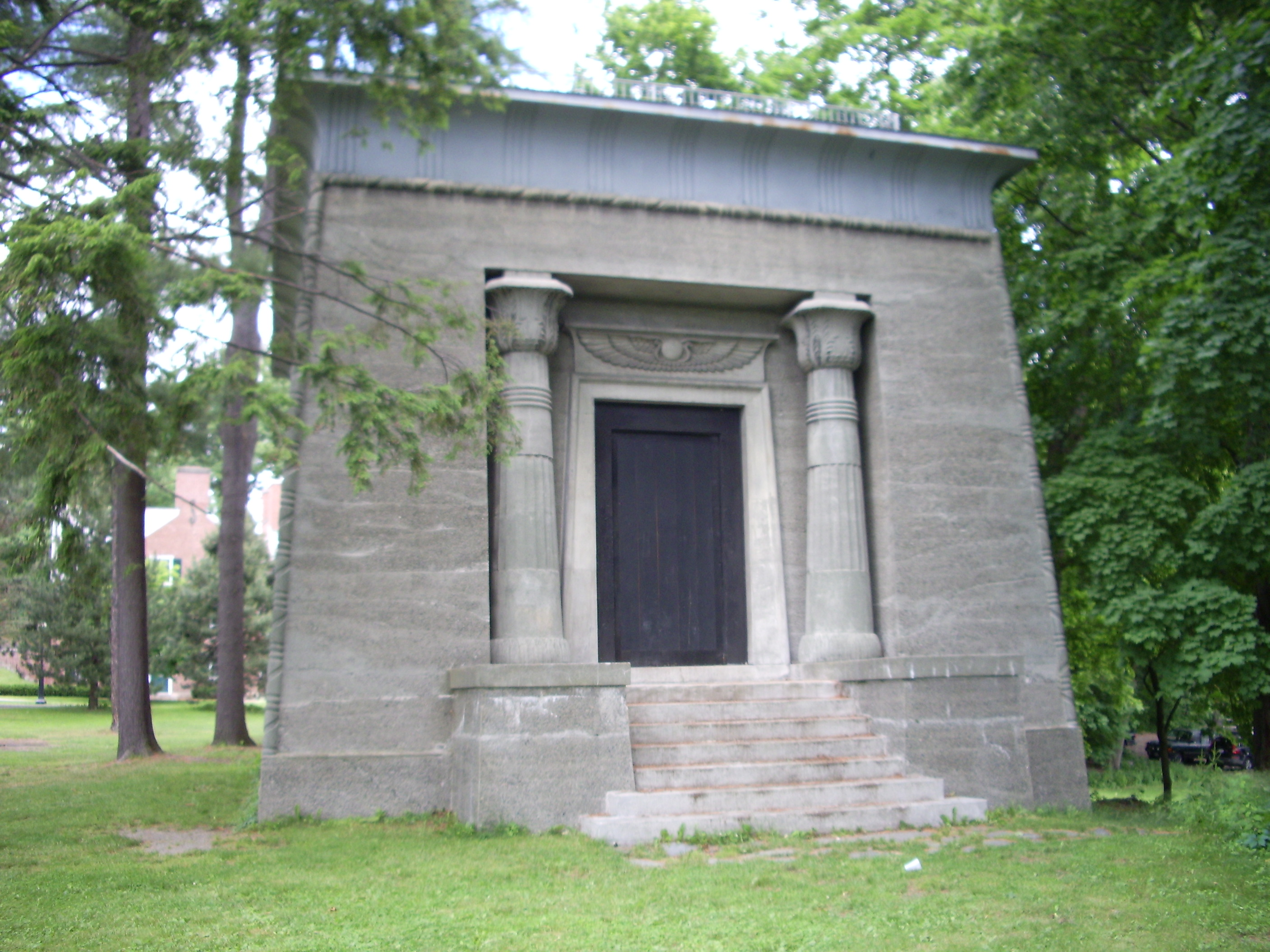
The tomb of the Sphinx secret society at Dartmouth College

Dartmouth College's Office of Residential Life states that the earliest senior societies on campus date to 1783 and "continue to be a vibrant tradition within the campus community". Today, Dartmouth officially recognizes fifteen senior societies and, according to the college, 25% of the senior class members join a senior society. Some of these societies are a secret society, with their membership remaining secret, while others are open honorary societies. (Note: Secret societies at the College include Dragon, Sphinx and Fire and Skoal. Gomstyn, Alice (2001-05-18). "Secret societies remain veiled in mystery". The Dartmouth. Archived from the original on 2 January 2002. Retrieved 24 May 2022.) The college's administration tracks membership and tapping lists, and differs from that of Yale's, though there are historical parallels between the two colleges' societies.

=== Duke University ===
Duke University has hosted several secret societies. The Tombs was founded in 1903. Its members were known to tie bells around their ankles. Details regarding its purpose, selection of members, and the importance of the bells are still unknown.

The Order of the Red Friars was founded in 1913 with the initial purpose of promoting school spirit. Later, the group changed its mission to focus more on fostering loyalty to Duke University. The Order, as it was colloquially known, was semi-secret. This is because the selection of new members, known as tapping, was held on the steps of Duke Chapel in broad daylight. As the years went on, the rites of tapping became more elaborate; in the final and most traditional form of the rite, a red-hooded and robed figure publicly tapped new men into membership on the steps of the chapel. It went inactive in 1971.

The Order of the White Duchy was founded in May 1925 by the Order of the Red Friars as an organization for outstanding females. From 1925 on, new members were tapped into the order by the seven members of the White Duchy from the previous year. Members were known by the white carnation they wore on specific days of the year. Throughout the 1960s, both societies faced charges of elitism and struggled to tap students at an increasingly hostile university. In 1968, the White Duchy disbanded, and in 1971, the Order of the Red Friars was disbanded by alumni who determined that the group had outlived its usefulness. However, rumors surrounding its continued, albeit modified, form exist today.

Two current secret societies at Duke are the Trident Society and the Old Trinity Club. The Old Trinity Club is rumored to have started when an editor-in-chief of the Duke Chronicle was passed up for membership and decided to create his rival society. The Old Trinity Club is the most visible society on campus today, as its members are seen walking around campus wearing black graduation gowns and sunglasses on certain days of the year; they follow a set pattern, holding their arms in symbols in the air and routinely stopping and shouting "Eruditio et Religio." A November 2007 edition of Rival Magazine quoted Associate Vice President for Student Affairs and Dean of Students, Sue Wasiolek T'r76, claiming that "the Old Trinity Club has died, or at least in terms of its original manifestation. The way it manifests today is very different than when it was at its finest." It is said that students do not take society seriously, viewing it more as a social fraternity than a secret society.

For years, there were rumors of a secret society called "TS" on campus as a continuation of the Order of the Red Friars' original mission. Only recently has it come to light that "TS" stands for Trident Society. This society keeps the strictest silence about its membership and mission. As such, its members are not well-known on campus. The secrecy around this group drove Samantha Lachman to investigate the society in 2013. Her subsequent article, "Trasked with Secrecy", revealed many of the secrets of the group. She discovered the names of several prominent members, that the red roses & white carnations sometimes found at the base of the James B. Duke statue on West Campus are their calling card, and even that they have uninhibited access to the Duke University Chapel for their Initiation Rites.

=== Emory University ===
Emory University in Atlanta, Georgia has five secret societies, including the Ducemus, DVS. Senior Honor Society, Paladin Society, Speculum, and Order of Ammon. DVS reveals its members names at graduation. In 2021, Ducemus was accused of attempting to manipulate Emory's student government elections by a member of its legislature, which led to a trial presided by the student judicial council. The accusatory plaintiff claimed that members of the secret society, who allegedly held positions in student government and various student organizations, attempted to sway the elections in their favor and secure positions for their members. The student judicial council ruled in the plaintiff's favor and disqualified the allegedly Ducemus-backed candidates.

=== Florida State University ===
The Burning Spear Society is a secret society at Florida State University. Burning Spear was founded on July 14, 1993. Though not much is publicly available on the dealings of the organization, members often cite the provision of political, professional, and financial support of FSU community members and efforts that strengthen the university's traditions as two of their most basic ambitions.

=== Fordham University ===
Fordham University was long accused of being involved with secret societies and covert activities due to anti-Catholic and nativist sentiments against the Irish and Italian immigrants it historically served. John Kelly, successor to Boss Tweed as Grand Sachem of Tammany Hall, was the nephew-in-law of Cardinal John McCloskey, the first president of Fordham, and many Fordham students and alumni were involved with Tammany Hall, including Edward Flynn, 20th-century chair of the Democratic National Committee.

Fr. Leo McLaughlin S.J. founded the Fordham Club in 1954. Membership is reserved to about thirty members of the Fordham College at Rose Hill senior class "recommended by their prominence and influence in extracurricular endeavors during their first three college years, having contributed in a significant and preeminent way to the vibrant spirit of Fordham." They have a robust alumni network with regular reunions and influence in the university.

Founded in 1837, the Parthenian Sodality was transferred to Fordham, which was founded in 1841, from St. Mary's College in Kentucky when the Jesuits took over the administration of Fordham from the Archdiocese of New York in 1846. Approval of the transfer was granted by the Roman Prima Primaria in 1847. The Roman Sodality, under whose guidance the Parthenian Sodality was, was first founded in Rome in 1584. Though no longer held to the Roman sodality after Vatican II, the organization is said to exist in some form to this day under the name The Second Sodality, at which point it transitioned to being more identifiable as a secret society: hiding membership, meeting at odd times, and communicating through codes and riddles. The chapel atop the administration building, now known as Cunniffe House, listed over a hundred years of members, but this practice ended around when the sodality went covert. They leave clues in the form of sonnets around campus and in the student newspapers to attract members. They tap around 25 members per year, of whom half usually figure out the clues. Meetings are usually held in the various chapels around campus, with important ceremonies happening in the Chapel of Our Lady of Sorrows.

There is evidence of a group known as the Legion of Hidden Loyalty, operating in the 1930s and 1940s but there is no evidence of its continued existence.

=== Furman University ===
Until 1992, Furman University was, to varying degrees, affiliated with the Southern Baptist Convention, which was against Greek letter organizations. This drove students to operate fraternities sub rosa until 1926 when the university changed its policies. Yielding to pressure from the Southern Baptist Convention, the university again banned Greek letter organizations again in June 1962. However, the former chapters of national organizations continued to exist sub rosa as local fraternities, including the Delta chapter of Pi Kappa Phi which became The Star and Lamp Fraternity. Sigma Alpha Epsilon and Tau Kappa Epsilon operated respectively as The Centaur Club and The Knights of Eternal, while the Kappa Alpha Order became the Robert E. Lee Club. Furman again allowed Greek letter fraternities on campus in 1993.

On campus today, the only known active secret society is The Magnolia Society, which is recognized by the university.

=== George Washington University ===
George Washington University president Stephen Joel Trachtenberg brought together student leaders from all parts of the university to create The Order of the Hippo as a way to support fellowship, make GW a better university, and behave in slightly frivolous ways. The secret society was named after a bronze statue of a hippo, also known as the River Horse (sculpture), displayed prominently in the center of campus. The Order takes its oath from a plaque located on the front of the hippo statue, which reads, "Art for wisdom, Science for joy, Politics for beauty, and a Hippo for hope." The Order has a ritual book, which is passed down from year to year, and the main aim of the group is to enact random acts of kindness around GW's campus to create a better environment for all students.

=== Georgetown University ===
Georgetown College, later Georgetown University, has been a Jesuit institution or staffed by Jesuits for its entire history. In the school's early days, the Jesuits were hostile to college fraternities and societies that tried to form at Georgetown, like at other colleges in the 19th century, because they could not control them. But this hostility had waned by 1920. One century later, Georgetown has several fraternities and sororities, independent of the university, and a few all-male, all-female, and co-ed secret societies.

The Stewards Society, or The Stewards at Georgetown, is an anonymous, all-male service fraternity, often considered a secret society. While generally considered a secret society by the student body, the Stewards have claimed to be a predominantly alumni-built organization. The original organization was founded in 1982, eventually going public in 1988. The Stewards would continue to operate until the mid-1990s when the organization broke apart, and the original group became defunct. Following this schism, the organization formed The Second and later the Third Stewards Societies, although the groups are not connected organizationally. The organization would put out public addresses in 2001 and 2020, claiming several service activities and defending their existence. In 2013, and 2020, the Stewards were the subject of a series of leaks, indicating that undisclosed members of the organization were part of student government. The group has been criticized for pushing a conservative agenda on campus and for its exclusion of women.

=== Georgia Institute of Technology ===
The Anak Society is the oldest known secret society and honors society at the Georgia Institute of Technology (Georgia Tech) in Atlanta, Georgia. Founded in 1908, Anak's purpose is "to honor outstanding juniors and seniors who have shown both exemplary leadership and a true love for Georgia Tech". The society's name refers to Anak, a biblical figure said to be the forefather of a race of giants. Although not founded as a secret society, Anak has kept its activities and membership rosters confidential since 1961. Membership is made public upon a student's graduation or a faculty member's retirement. The Anak Society's membership comprises at least 1,100 Georgia Tech graduates, faculty members, and honorary members.

The society was influential in the history of Georgia Tech. Anak played a major role in establishing several of Georgia Tech's most active student organizations – including Georgia Tech's yearbook, the Blueprint; The Technique newspaper, and Tech's Student Government Association – as well as several lasting Georgia Tech traditions. The society also claims involvement in several civil rights projects, most notably in peacefully integrating Georgia Tech's first African-American students in 1961, preventing the Ku Klux Klan from setting up a student chapter at Georgia Tech.

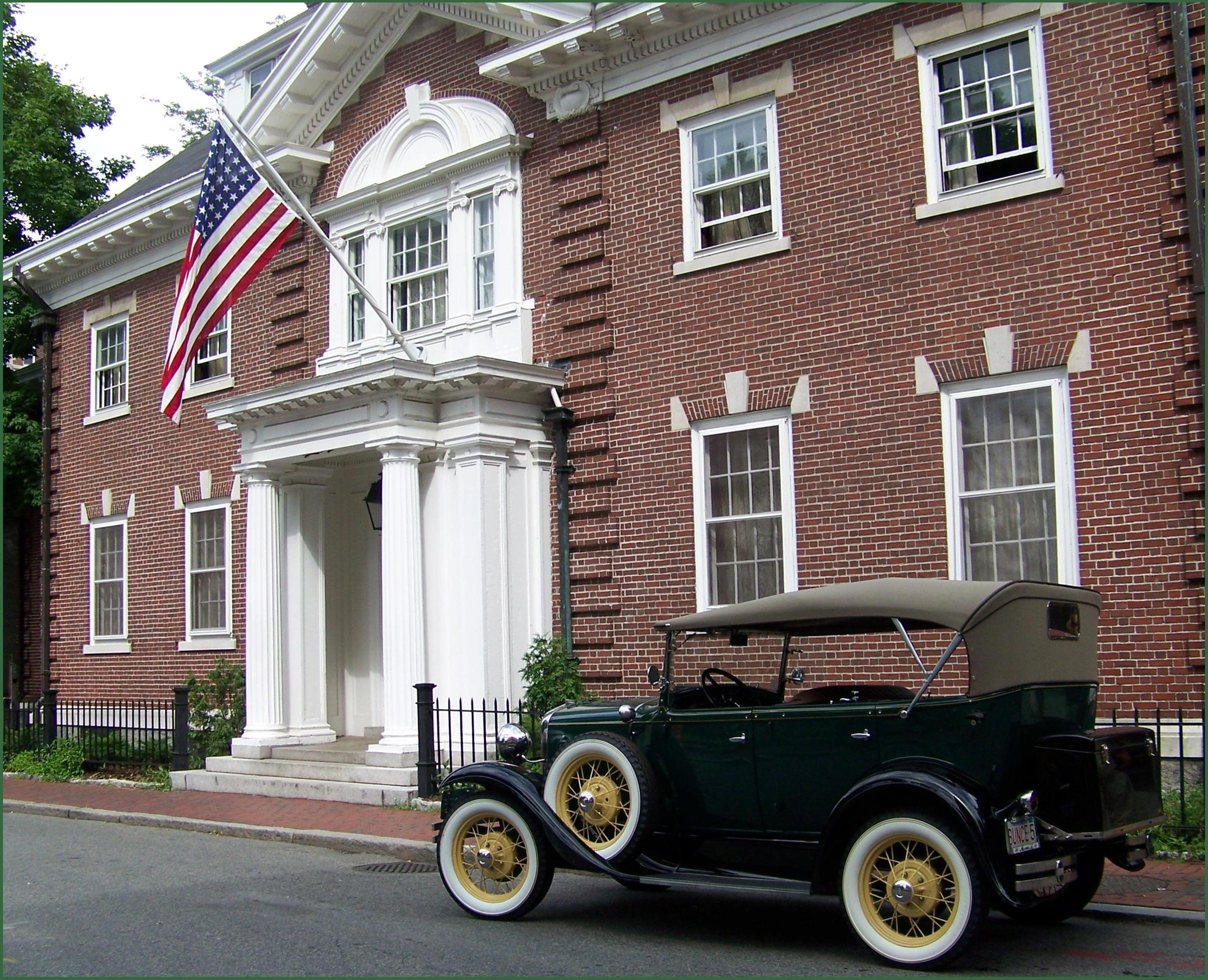
Owl Club Clubhouse, Cambridge, Massachusetts.

=== Harvard University ===
Harvard University does not have secret societies in the usual sense, though it does have final clubs, fraternities, sororities, and a variety of other secret or semi-secret organizations.

Final clubs are secretive about their election procedures, and they have secret initiations and meetings. However, there is little secrecy about who is a member. They are larger than secret societies generally, with approximately forty students per club. Guests are admitted under restrictions. "Punch Season" and the "Final Dinner" are analogous to "Tap" at Yale.

Harvard Lodge is a university Masonic lodge founded in 1922 by Harvard Law School Dean/Professor Roscoe Pound, members of the Harvard Square & Compass Club, and members of the Harvard Masonic Club (which included Theodore Roosevelt). It is the oldest academic Masonic lodge in North America, its membership is restricted to males with a Harvard affiliation, and it operates in the building of Grand Lodge of Massachusetts, overlooking Boston Common.

=== James Madison University ===
James Madison University has two known secret societies. The first is called IN8 (pronounced /ɪˈneɪt/). The name references the college's founding in 1908, and the emblem of the organization consists of an infinity sign with an ‘I’ and ‘N’ embedded within the curve. Most notably, IN8 is known for its laud of eight students per semester who have outstanding college careers and fulfill the organization's eight supposed core values: Loyalty, Benevolence, Service, Justice, Integrity, Intellect, Character, and Spirit. However, this is not their only known function, IN8 also provides philanthropic gifts to the university. The sundial located by the Quad, which is a famous landmark for many of the students, was donated by the group. IN8 hosts a website bearing their emblem, which states, “The IN8 Foundation is a benevolent, charitable organization supporting the James Madison University community.”

The IN8 Foundation was mentioned in The Insider's Guide to the Colleges, 2009. Writing on student involvement at James Madison University, Insider Guides states that IN8 is “Not necessarily the most popular but one of the most famed among these [student groups] is IN8, JMU’s secret society. Every year, it gives out eight letters to students and faculty who have significantly impacted their society to let them know that their work does not go unnoticed. In addition, in 2003, they donated a human sundial, a spot in the middle of campus where a person stands on a particular month’s mark and casts a shadow on plaques six or seven feet away that designates the time.”

The second secret society at James Madison University is called Missed Connections. This society is known for its Instagram page that posts anonymous messages from students at James Madison University. These messages can range from talking about acts of kindness that they experienced on campus, to grievances against people or things they encounter. This society was founded in 2019 by Emily Chavez, Casey Brewer, and Angilxander Lonzon, and they were known as Bumi, Mort, and Appa, respectively. When they graduated, they revealed themselves and passed the society down to new people. It is believed that whenever a member of Missed Connections graduates, they will reveal themselves to the James Madison University community and further pass their position to a new person.

=== Johns Hopkins University ===
Through the years, many secret societies, senior societies, and other groups have been founded at Johns Hopkins University. Most of these societies were founded around the 1890s at the beginning of the university and played a significant role in the early development of the student body. This includes the Cane Club, The Ananias Society, The Senior Society, The Ubiquiteers, the Tau Club, and the De Gang. These historic secret societies are either defunct or non-existent.

The Blue Jay Supper Society is the only active secret society with open applications at Johns Hopkins. The supper society looks for "brilliant misfits and creatives", emphasizing friendship and appreciation of art. They accept applications from undergraduate and graduate students as well as alumni.

=== Loyola University Maryland ===
Loyola University Maryland in Baltimore, Maryland has had a few secret societies The Green and Grey Society, named after the school’s colors, was established in 1989. The school selects “a small number of men and women from the senior class who demonstrated excellence in academic, personal, and spiritual integration and a commitment to leadership and service to Loyola. In the spirit of Jesuit ideals, the Society serves as an advisor to the University executives by identifying and communicating issues of significance. As engaged members of the community, the Society empowers students across the University to live the magis.” While the society is acknowledged to exist, they members and overall selection process remains elusive.

=== Longwood University ===
Longwood University currently has three secret societies, the oldest of which is CHI, founded on October 15, 1900, by members from three of Longwood's four sorority Alpha chapters-- Kappa Delta, Zeta Tau Alpha, and Sigma Sigma Sigma. The society was originally called the "Society of Societies" whose original intentions were to hold students accountable and enrich the lives of their peers and professors by calling out bad behavior, taking hooded walks called "CHI Walks" and hosting a bonfire at the end of each academic year called "CHI burning" where senior members would reveal themselves to campus. Today, CHI represents something very different and works on behalf of the college to represent the Longwood spirit—the blue and white spirit. Members make their presence known by leaving small "droppings" or tokens around campus, writing letters to Longwood students, faculty, and staff that celebrate their achievements, and the members of CHI "commend" members during their annual "CHI Burning" which remains to this day. The mark of the society can be found on the sidewalks of the campus, where their symbol (a simple geometric version of Ruffner Hall) is painted in blue. Students, faculty, and staff do not step on these symbols as a means of paying respect to the society, the Longwood spirit, and the preservation of said spirit. The physical presence of CHI can also be found on campus because the society has donated generously to many campus fundraising campaigns and donated the CHI Fountain, located at the center of campus, which, along its top stone, reads the public motto of the society.

The third-oldest and second-longest consistently operating secret society at Longwood is Princeps, which was founded in 1992 on the premise of promoting citizen leadership and academic excellence. The society is represented by the number seven, with a seven-point crown above the number, most commonly in black. The society's colors are red, gold, and black, and they often commend members of the community with letters, tokens of achievement, and other gifts. Princeps, meaning "leader" in Latin, also award paper cutout versions of their symbol, the seven, to students who achieve both Dean's List and President's List. Those who achieve the Dean's List receive a black seven, and those who achieve the President's List receive a red seven. Princeps also recognizes students with wooden sevens, and the senior members of the society reveal themselves on graduation morning on the front steps of Lancaster Hall, home to the President's Office, at 7:07 am, where they appear from within the crowd or from the building wearing a red sash with their symbol, the 7 and crown, stitched on the sash which drapes across their body. Membership selection for this society, just like CHI, remains a secret.

=== New York University ===
Several secret societies have historically existed at New York University, including Red Dragon Society, which only takes both "distinguished" male and female seniors from the College of Arts and Science; Knights of the Lamp, which only takes seniors from the Stern School of Business; the Philomathean Society (which operated from 1832 to 1888); the Eucleian Society (from 1832 to the 1940s); and the Andiron Club. Only Red Dragon Society still exists.

=== Norwich University ===
Secret societies are banned in all military academies in the United States. Norwich University was the last military academy to outlaw secret societies, doing so in 1998. The stated reason for doing so was controversy regarding hazing and abuse of cadets. Before the ban, Norwich was home to a handful of long-standing secret societies such as the Old Crow Society, Night Riders, and Skull and Swords.

=== Pennsylvania State University ===
There are currently three well-known societies at Pennsylvania State University: Parmi Nous (1907), Lion's Paw (1908), and Skull and Bones (1912). Penn State has seen several different honorary societies with varying levels of publicity and activity. In 1907, the first "hat" society, so-named because of such organizations' emblematic headwear, Druids, was formed; similar societies expanded and included dedicated groups for women (e.g., Chimes, Scrolls) and men (e.g., Blue Key, Androcles) based on class standing and extracurricular involvement. These groups were temporarily governed by a "Hat Society Council" which was made up of representatives from each organization from 1948 to 1958. Hat societies were involved in University life passing down traditions (called "freshmen customs") for first-year students, forming honor guards for football players as they went on to the field, and recognizing leaders, scholars, and athletes in the Penn State community. The three remaining senior societies no longer operate publicly but continue to serve the university in a variety of functions. Lion's Paw is closely associated with conservation efforts at Mount Nittany in State College, PA.

=== Pomona College ===
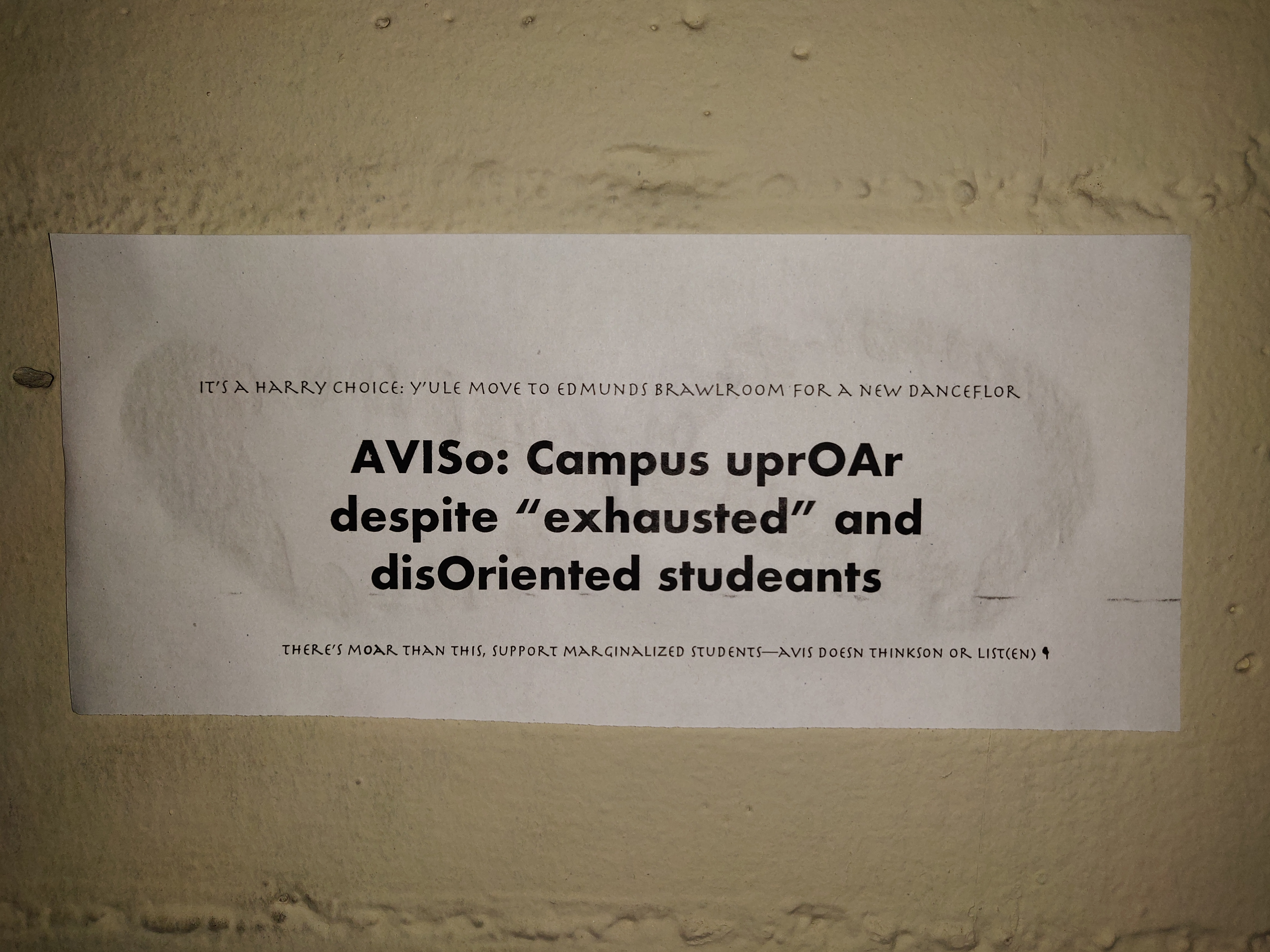
A Mufti burger

Pomona College's secret society is called Mufti, meaning "out of uniform". It is known for gluing small sheets of paper around campus with cryptic puns offering social commentary on campus happenings. The society originated in 1958 and was initially the work of class of 1960 graduates Martha Tams Barthold, Jean Wentworth Bush Guerin, Alice Taylor Holmes and Thomasine Wilson. The tradition was passed down to young women (and later men) from subsequent classes and has waxed and waned in activeness over the years. Its 3.5 in × 8.5 in (89 mm × 216 mm) postings, known as "burgers", typically contain three lines, with the center one being most prominent. They are glued to surfaces around campus using a figure eight shape.

=== Princeton University ===
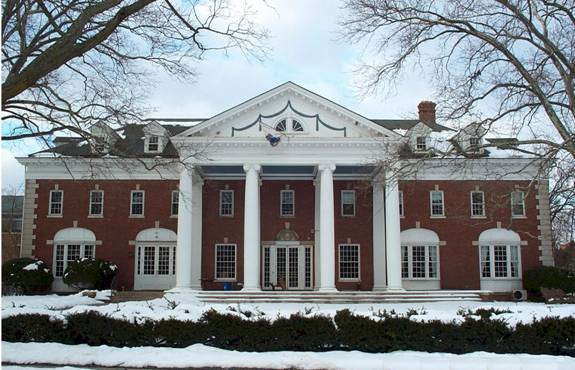
Colonial Club at Princeton University

Princeton's eating clubs are not fraternities, nor are they secret societies by any standard measure, but they are often seen as being tenuously analogous. The 21 Club, an all-male drinking society, is a notorious Princeton secret society.

Princeton also has a long tradition of underground societies. While secret society membership is relatively public at some schools, Princeton's historical secret society rolls are very secretive because of Woodrow Wilson's ban on clandestine organizations and his threat to expel secret fraternity members from Princeton.

One such society is Phi (pronounced fē), a society dating to 1929 when members of the Whig society splintered off after the merger of the Whig and Cliosophic debating societies. Phi's membership is secretive and difficult to discern because no more than ten active "Phis" exist at one time. They usually receive offers at the end of their third year. As an adaptation to Princeton's stringent anti-society rules, each active class does not meet the preceding class that selected it until the First of June (after their first Reunions and before graduation). 1.6... is the Golden Ratio, hence the name Phi.

Another society is the exclusively female Foxtail Society, founded in 1974, soon after Princeton began admitting women in 1969. The society was founded in response to the lack of eating clubs open to women. While admittance numbers have changed over the years, Foxtail selects anywhere from 10 to 15 women to become members at the end of their junior year.

=== Purdue University ===
Founded in 1910, as the Order of Iron Key, the Iron Key at Purdue University is a secret organization that provides service to the campus community. Originally for men, it became coed in 1971. Its twelve members are known only to the university president until graduation.

=== Rutgers University ===
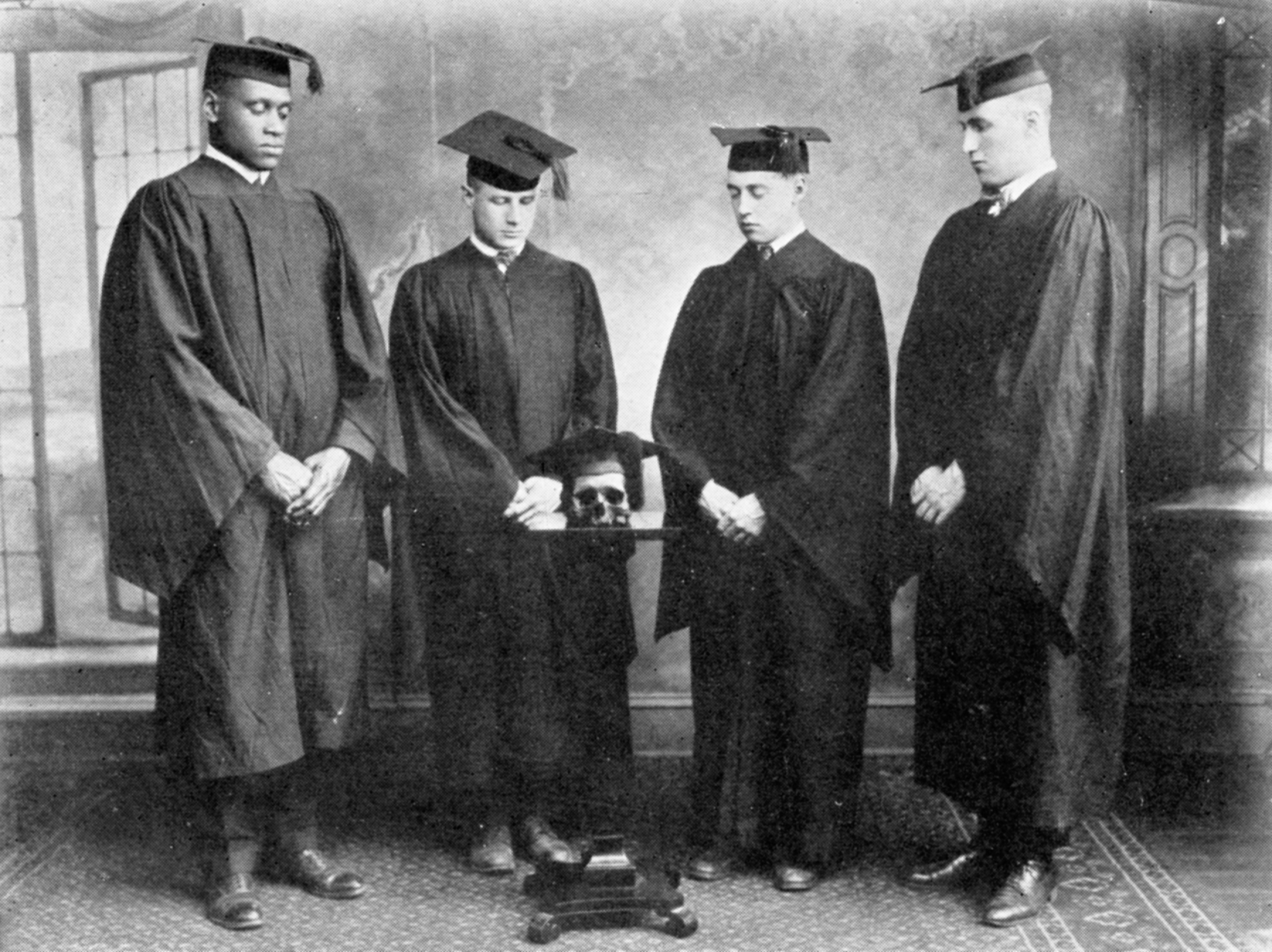
Cap and Skull, class of 1919; Paul Robeson at far left

Rutgers University has had several secret societies on campus. One of which, the Order of the Bull's Blood claims to be established in 1834; some believe it is a hoax but it did gain national coverage in 1875. Students associated with these societies were allegedly involved in the Rutgers-Princeton Cannon War in 1876. At the turn of the 20th century, Rutgers had developed two full sets of class year societies based on the Yale model, down to the freshman societies such as the Chain and Bones and Serpent and Coffin. The senior class societies at Rutgers included the Brotherhood of the Golden Dagger (1898–1940), Casque and Dagger (1901), and Cap and Skull (1900). Cap and Skull was dissolved in the 1960s after complaints of elitism. In 1982, the name was revived for the university-sanctioned senior-year honor society.

=== Smith College ===
Smith College had secret societies from the 1890s until the 1960s. Two of these societies, the Orangemen and the Ancient Order of Hibernians (A.O.H.), were both founded in 1890 and carried out a rivalry throughout their existence at the college. A.O.H. was a parody of the Irish Roman Catholic fraternal order by the same name, the Ancient Order of Hibernians, which dates back to 1500s Ireland. The Orangemen was a parody of the Loyal Orange Association, a protestant Irish organization, which dates back to 1795 Ireland. A.O.H. did ask for official recognition but was turned down.

A.O.H’s color was green, and the Orangemen’s was orange. The Orangemen wore cloaks with orange hoods and also had orange hats in which they paraded around campus. A.O.H. also had activities, including giving out special names to new members. According to Smith College Special Collections, both organizations limited membership to twelve from each class year. A.O.H. held initiations for new members in the fall of their first year of college. The Orangemen also held initiations.

In 1948, the college's president, Herbert John Davis, outlawed secret societies because he believed they were “undemocratic.” Davis required groups to stop “all official activities.” However, Smith College Special Collections says, “records indicate that both organizations continued unofficially until the mid-1960s,” with available documentation ceasing during the 1965–1966 academic year.

=== University of Chicago ===
The University of Chicago has never had a substantial number of active secret societies; indeed, shortly after the university's founding, the faculty of the university released a resolution suggesting that the exclusionary structure of many such societies made them antithetical to the democratic spirit of the university. Nevertheless, The Society of the Owl and Serpent was founded in 1896 and was active for over 70 years. The Society voted to officially disband in 1968 as a sign of its "counterculture" values, electing to donate its office space to the student radio group WHPK and use its remaining funds for the purchase of an FM transmitter.

=== University of Florida ===
Florida Blue Key operates as the main collegiate secret society at the University of Florida. Founded in 1923 by student leaders organizing Dad's Day, the group of students decided to create a leadership honorary society. Florida Blue Key eventually came to hold the responsibility of organizing Homecoming, Gator Growl, the Miss UF Beauty Pageant, and the Florida Blue Key High School Speech & Debate Tournament.

Throughout its existence, Florida Blue Key has been caught in numerous scandals concerning its control over UF's student government. The organization paid $85,000 in a settlement to Charles Grapski for defamation in the 1995 UF student government elections. The subsequent trial determined that Florida Blue Key "has historically undertaken a political function in connection with student government affairs." The political machine that Florida Blue Key controls to dominate student government has been given the name "The System."

=== University of Georgia ===
The highest achievement a male can attain at the university is claimed by the Gridiron secret society. Palladia secret society was founded in 1978 as the highest honor a woman can attain at the University of Georgia. Since 2003, Palladia has publicly recognized its members. A group unique to the University of Georgia is the men's secret society known as the Order of the Greek Horsemen, which annually inducts five fraternity men, all leaders of the fraternity system. The Panhellenic sororities also have a secret society known as Trust of the Pearl, which inducts five accomplished sorority women each spring.

=== University of Michigan ===
The University of Michigan Ann Arbor hosts three secret societies: Order of Angell, Phoenix, and the Vulcan Senior Engineering Society. Order of Angell and Phoenix were once under the umbrella group "The Tower Society", the name referring to their location at the top of the Michigan Union Tower. Michigauma (Order of Angell) was all male, while Adara (Phoenix) was all female.

Order of Angell, known as "Order", is an evolved version of a previous society Michigauma. It was inspired by the rituals and culture of the Native Americans of the United States. Since its creation in 1902, the group is credited with creating Dance Marathon, one of the largest charitable events at the University of Michigan, and the construction of the Michigan Union, for which it was granted permanent space on the top floors of the tower which they refer to as the "tomb." In 2007 the group changed its name to Order of Angell and later, in 2021, the group officially disbanded.

Phoenix (formerly known as Adara), holding to astrological roots, was formed in the late 1970s by the women leaders on campus. In the early 1980s, they joined the tower society and occupied the sixth floor of the tower just below Michigamua. Phoenix, alongside Order, is now co-ed. Phoenix was disbanded in March 2021 via a vote of an overwhelming majority.

Vulcan Senior Engineering Society, known as "the Vulcans" was organized in 1904 as a senior engineering honorary society. It occupied the fifth floor of the Union Tower. Its draws its heritage from the Roman god Vulcan. The group supports scholarships for the University of Michigan College of Engineering. The Vulcans have not been active since 2010.

Alpha Theta of Theta Nu Epsilon in 1917

QEBH, Tap Day 2006

=== University of Missouri ===
In 1895, the Alpha Theta chapter of the Theta Nu Epsilon sophomore society was founded under the guidance of faculty member Luther DeFoe. DeFoe also served as a mentor to the founding members of the QEBH senior men's society, which was founded in 1898. Mystical Seven was founded in 1907 and has become the second best-known society on campus. Some have suggested that Missouri's Mystical Seven was modeled after Virginia's Seven Society, which had been established just a couple of years earlier.

Other secret societies followed, including Society of the Hidden Eye for junior and senior men, LSV for senior women, Thadstek for freshman and sophomore men, Tomb and Key for freshman and sophomore men, and Kappa Kappa whose membership composition was unknown. During this period of rapid expansion of secret societies, a network of sub-rosa inter-fraternity organizations also established itself on campus with no purpose other than socializing and mischief-making. This network, known commonly as the "Greek Underworld" included organizations such as Seven Equals, Kappa Beta Phi, Sigma Phi Sigma, Kappa Nu Theta, and Sigma Alpha Beta.

It is currently home to at least six secret honor societies that still participate in an annual public Taies Day ceremony at the end of each spring semester. QEBH, Mystical Seven, LSV, Alpha Xi chapter of Omicron Delta Kappa, Friars chapter of Mortar Board, and Rollins Society each use the Tap Day ceremony after the year to reveal the members who were initiated over the past year. Missouri is one of the few remaining institutions in which the local Omicron Delta Kappa and Mortar Board chapters carry out much of their work in secrecy. The Jefferson Society, which attempted to take part in Tap Day and was denied, claims to have been around since 1862. In addition to Tap Day activities, several of the societies maintain a public presence during some athletic events. QEBH is the caretaker of the Victory Bell, along with Nebraska's Society of Innocents, awarded to the winner of the Missouri–Nebraska Rivalry football game each year. The Friars Chapter of Mortar Board exchanges a gavel with Nebraska (The Black Masque Chapter of Mortar Board) at each MU-UNL football game, symbolizing the rivalry between the Universities. Mystical Seven and Oklahoma's Pe-et Society were likewise entrusted with the Peace Pipe trophy that was awarded to the winner of the biennial Missouri-Oklahoma football match. Omicron Delta Kappa previously served as the caretaker of the Indian War Drum trophy awarded to the winner of the annual Border War football game between Missouri and Kansas.

=== University of North Carolina at Chapel Hill ===
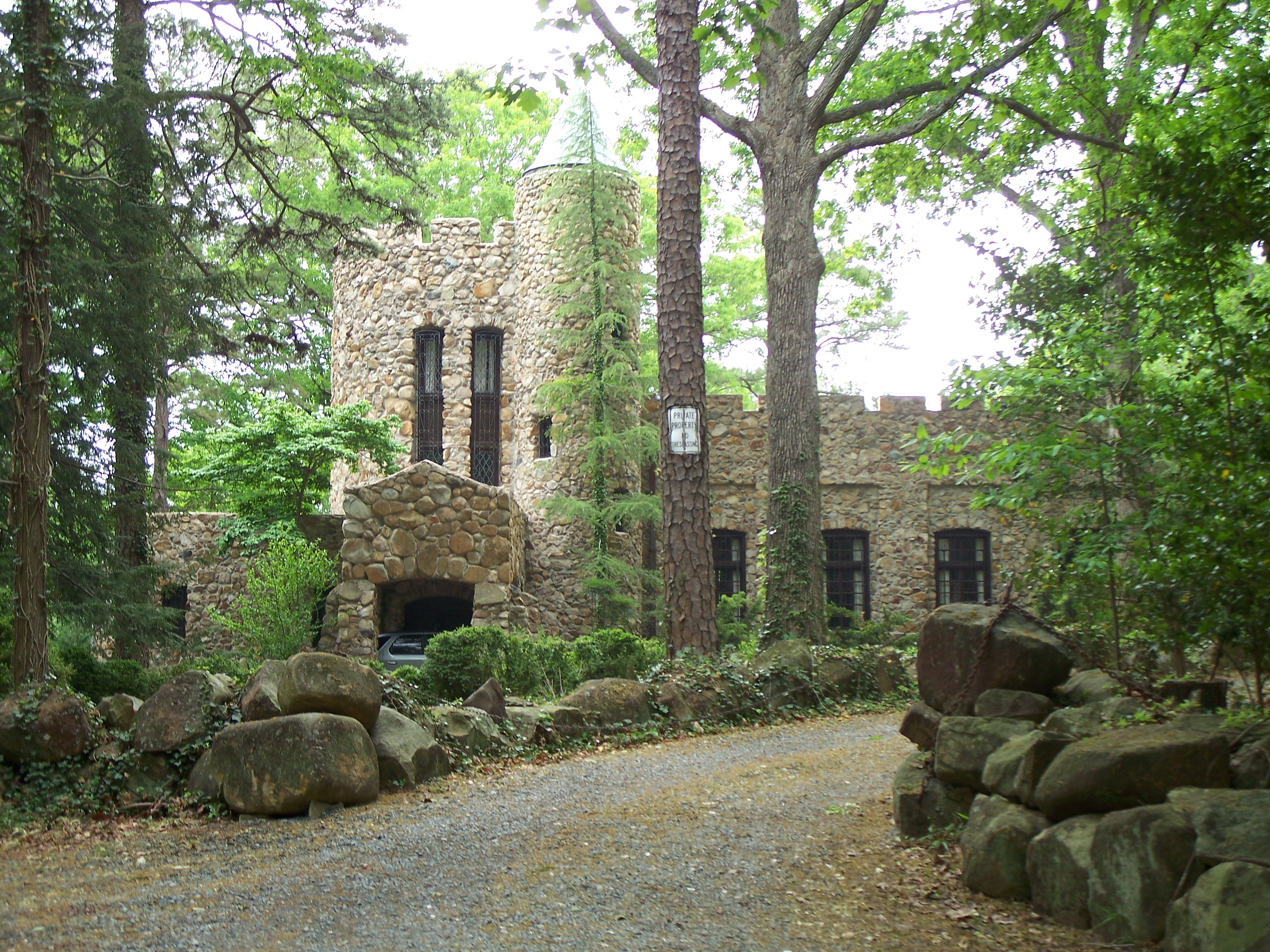
Hippol Castle, Order of Gimghoul

The library at the University of North Carolina at Chapel Hill contains the archives of the Order of Gimghoul, a secret society headquartered at the Gimghoul Castle. The order was founded in 1889 and is open to male students (rising juniors and higher), and faculty members by invitation.

The Order of the Gorgon's Head was founded in 1896 by Darius Eatman, Edward Kidder Graham, Ralph Henry Graves, Samuel Selden Lamb, Richard Henry Lewis Jr., and Percy DePonceau Whitaker. Membership has always been limited to male members of the junior, senior, professional, and post-graduate classes, along with male faculty members. Inductees may not be members of other societies. Officers include Princeps (chief officer), Quaestor, and Scriptor. The purpose of the Order is to promote friendship, goodwill, and social fellowship among its members. The Order of the Gorgon's Head was one of two "junior orders" established at the university in the 1890s. The two orders had written agreements that they would not attempt to recruit freshmen or sophomores. Each order had a lodge (the Gimghouls later built a castle) where members gathered for meetings and events. Each had secret rituals based on myths. Those of the Order of the Gorgon's Head centered on the myth of the Gorgons, three monstrous sisters prominent in ancient Greek and Roman lore.

In 2011, The Daily Tar Heel reported the first of two donations to campus entities by a secret society named Infinity. In 2011, the society gifted $888.88 to the Eve Carson Scholarship fund, which honors the late Student Body President Eve Carson. In 2012, the society gifted $888.88 to the Student Enrichment Fund, a student-created fund allowing students to apply for grants to attend off-campus events such as speeches, conferences or other academic or extracurricular opportunities. The significance of the digit '8' comes from the symbol for infinity that resembles an eight on its side.

=== University of North Carolina at Greensboro ===
The first secret society was established at the University of North Carolina at Greensboro in 1896; upon its discovery by the administration, this Greek lettered sorority was promptly disbanded. Formed in the early 2000s by Honors College students and campus creatives, The Guild is a semi-clandestine society reputed for its irreverent intellectualism, interdisciplinary ethos, and flair for underground theatrics.

=== University of Nevada, Reno ===
The Special Collections and University Archives found at Mathewson-IGT Knowledge Center at the University of Nevada, Reno contain records of an all-male, secret society known as Coffin and Keys. Founded in 1916, a group of ten male students sent a letter to the University President, Archer W. Hendrick, expressing their wish to establish a secret organization for upperclassmen with membership limited to 15 students. The archives contain correspondences and newsletters dated from 1916 to present-day.

=== University of Texas ===
The University of Texas at Austin is home to the Tejas Club, an all-male secret society founded in 1925 that is one of the oldest student organizations on campus. The three pillars of Tejas are scholarship, leadership, and friendship, representing a desire to attract and mold male student leaders on campus. Its membership process is secretive and closed to the public.

=== University of South Carolina ===
The Clariosophic Society is a literary society founded in 1806 at the University of South Carolina, then known as South Carolina College. It was formed after the splitting of the Philomathic Society, which had been formed within weeks of the opening of the college in 1805 and included virtually all students. At the Synapian Convention in February 1806, the members of Philomathic voted to split into two societies, Clariosophic and Euphradian. Two blood brothers picked the members for the new groups, like choosing sides for an impromptu baseball game. John Goodwin became the first president of Clariosophic. Other early presidents include Stephen Elliott, Hugh S. Legaré, George McDuffie, and Richard I. Manning. The Society was reactivated in 2013 and became co-ed. The membership process and society roster are secretive and closed to the public. Members are identified by a key insignia on their diplomas.

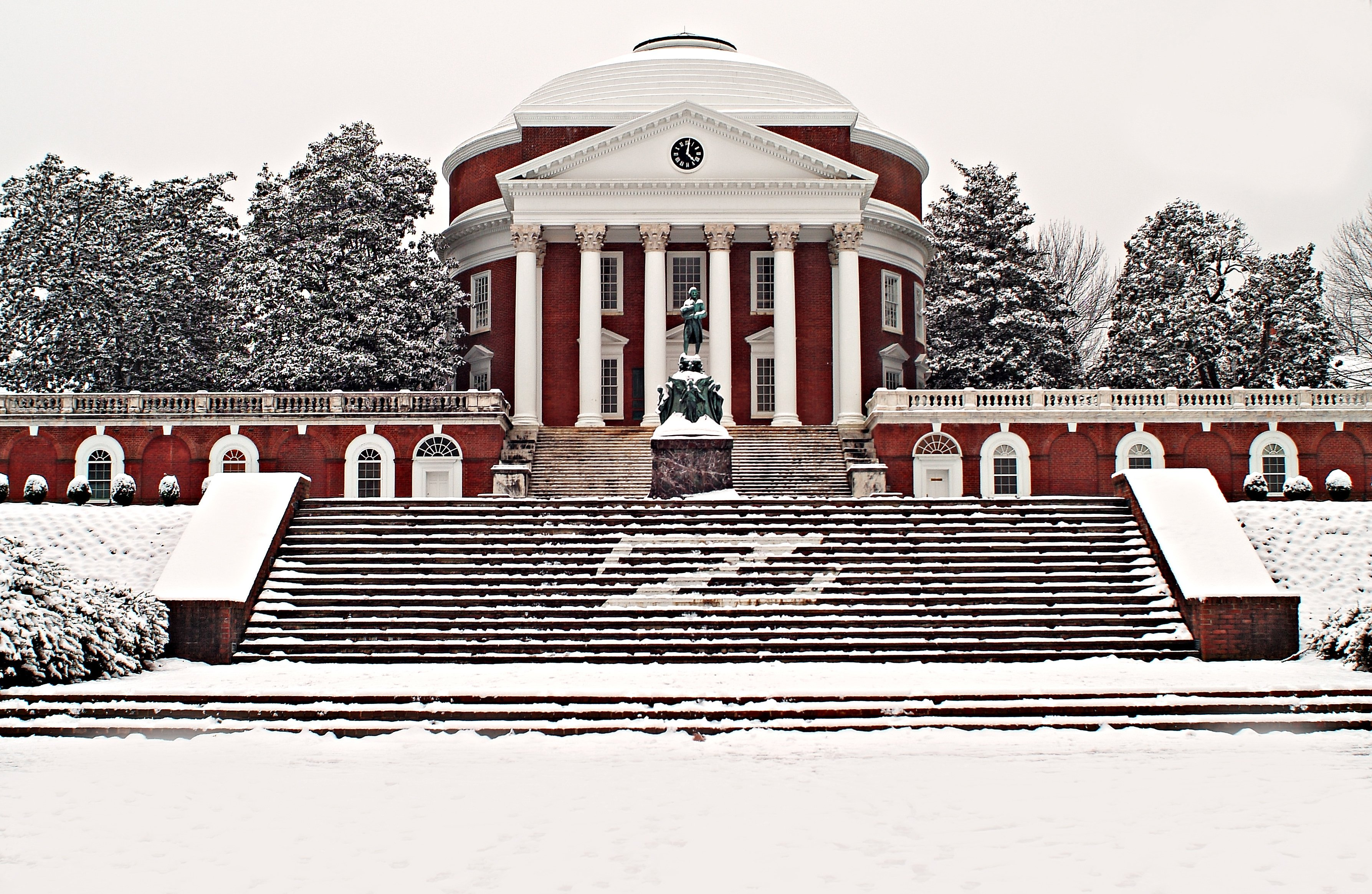
The Rotunda, with Z Society logo

=== University of Virginia ===
Secret societies have been a part of University of Virginia student life since the founding of the Eli Banana society in 1878. Early secret societies, such as Eli Banana and T.I.L.K.A., had secret initiations but public membership; some, such as the Hot Feet, now the IMP Society, were very public, incurring the wrath of the administration for public reveals.

The first truly "secret society" was the Seven Society, founded circa 1905. Two decades before, there had been a chapter of the Mystical 7 Society at Virginia, which may have been an inspiration. Nothing is known about the Seven Society except for their philanthropy to the university; members are revealed at their death. A few other societies flourished around the turn of the 20th century, such as the Z Society (formerly Zeta), which was founded in 1892, The IMP Society, reformulated in 1913 after the Hot Feet was banned in 1908, and Eli Banana are still active at the university today. The Thirteen Society was founded on February 13, 1889. After an unknown period of inactivity, they reemerged in 2004. Currently, The Thirteen Society operates as a mainly honorary society for those who demonstrate "unselfish service to the University and excellence in their respective fields of activity."

New societies have periodically appeared at the university during the 20th century. The most notable is the P.U.M.P.K.I.N. Society, a secret group that rewards contributions to the university and which was founded before 1970; and the Society of the Purple Shadows, founded 1963, who are only seen in public in purple robes and hoods and who seek to "safeguard vigilantly the University traditions". The A.N.G.E.L.S. Society started sometime in the late 1900s is known to place white roses and letters on doors of those mourning, needing encouragement, or showing "kind behavior" to others. They are known to promote a stronger community of kindness throughout the university, completing many acts of service for students and faculty. Many of the secret societies listed contribute to the university either financially or through awards or some other form of recognition of excellence at the university.

=== University of Washington ===
The University of Washington in Seattle, Washington is known for one secret society, the Oval Club. Founded in 1907, the Oval Club was founded to "promote student unity and cooperation, develop cultural leaders and preserve traditions of the University of Washington". Records for Oval Club meetings have been kept by the University of Washington Library's Special Collection dating up to 1963, and membership is publicly acknowledged for Oval Club.

=== University of Wisconsin-Madison ===
Founded in 1902 as the Iron Cross Society, the Iron Shield Society is an exclusive undergraduate honors society at the University of Wisconsin–Madison. Although historically a secret society, its existence and membership are now public, with member names listed on its website and honored at the university's Memorial Union after graduation. The society played a key role in founding the Memorial Union in 1907. Membership, consisting of juniors and seniors, is based on nominations from faculty, staff, student leaders, and organizations, considering extracurricular and community achievements. Originally all-male, it now includes women. In 2020, the organization changed its name from Iron Cross Society to Iron Shield Society to distance itself from any potential association with the Nazi-era symbol. Notable alumni include former U.S. Senator Russ Feingold and former Wisconsin Supreme Court Chief Justice Nathan Heffernan.

=== Washington and Lee University ===
Washington and Lee University in Lexington, Virginia, has two secret societies: the Sigma Society and the Cadaver Society. Founded in 1880, the Sigma Society is one of Washington and Lee's "oldest, continuous social organizations". While membership information is not necessarily anonymous, the group's purpose and inner workings remain a secret. The group has long had a connection to President George Washington, though the extent of that relationship is unknown to the public at large. Similarly, the acronym P.A.M.O.L.A. R.Y.E.—which is inscribed on buildings and in classrooms throughout the Lexington area—also bears an unknown significance to the group. The group has largely gone underground since 1994 when University officials tore down the Sigma cabin and paid the Sigmas $15,000. Associate Justice to the Supreme Court Lewis Powell Jr. is one of the group's most prominent members.

The membership and organizational structure of the Cadaver Society are largely unknown. Cadaver has been in continuous operation since its founding in 1957. The Cadavers have a bridge that bears their name, connecting the main campus to Wilson Field, as well as their symbol in many prominent places throughout the campus. Cadavers are known for donating large sums of money to the university and for upholding the school’s historic values. They have been criticized for their secrecy, and many of their activities include running around dressed in all black and masks late at night as well as drawing their symbol all over campus. They have been known to run through the Sorority houses, talking in high voices and attempting to wake everyone in the houses up.

=== Washington University in St. Louis ===
Three known secret societies operate at Washington University in St. Louis: ThurtenE, Lock & Chain, and Chimes. Instead of "secret societies", they are called Honoraries because of the public nature of their members and their purposes within the community.

ThurtenE was formed in 1904 as a secret society of junior men chosen for their leadership, character, and participation in campus activities. Not much is known about the founding of the group or its selection process from the early years other than the fact that only the members themselves knew who belonged to ThurtenE and membership varied from 4 to 14, before finally settling on a consistent 13. Members made themselves known at the end of their senior year during graduation by wearing a small skull pin and having the number “13” listed next to their names in Washington University's yearbook "The Hatchet". In recent years, the 13 new members are revealed when pieces of paper listing the names and the honorary symbol are posted around campus. ThurtenE found its purpose in 1935 when it was approached by the Chancellor to rescue the floundering student circus from the senior honorary, which had merged with another group. Since 1935, ThurtenE has held the Thurtene Carnival, which is the largest and oldest student-run Carnival in the nation. The society has been co-ed since 1991.

Lock & Chain was created in 1904 by six sophomore men. Since then, the honorary has expanded to 15 members from different backgrounds. Students are chosen during the spring from the freshman class based on academic merit, extracurricular involvement, leadership capabilities and roles, and personal qualities through an application and interview process. New members can be seen around campus wearing chains across their chests. Lock & Chain sponsors various events throughout the year and does community engagement and philanthropic programming.

Chapter of Chimes Junior Honorary, founded in 1948 as a women's group, is a group of juniors who share values of scholarship, leadership, and service. Each class works together for one year on programming for Wash U's campus, the internal Chapter, and the chosen partner philanthropy, with the freedom to follow their path for the year. Each member has a name assigned to them that represents an aspect of what they bring to the Honorary (such as intrepidity or flair). Their main campus program is Chimes Week, which explores a particular theme. Like ThurtenE, Chimes has been co-ed since 1991.

=== Yale University ===
The term "secret society" at Yale University encompasses organizations with many shared but not identical characteristics. The first secret society at Yale was a chapter of Phi Beta Kappa, established in 1780; however, its chapter dropped it secret status in the 1820s. In the traditional Yale system, societies were organized by class year, with societies for freshmen, sophomore, juniors, and seniors. All the societies were independent. Each of the societies had a link in the class year before and after it; that is, members of one freshman society would all get elected to the same sophomore society year after year, and so on so that there were two or three parallel sets of linked societies.

Yale's system of class secret societies kept it out of the more typical intercollegiate college fraternity system, although some regular college fraternities were created out of the junior societies at Yale. Delta Kappa Epsilon, a Yale junior society formed in 1840, is now a national traditional fraternity. Yale banned freshmen societies in 1880 and sophomore societies in 1900. The senior-class societies continue to prosper today without any of the lower-class societies.

There are typical attributes of the Yale societies. They are often restricted by class year, especially the senior class. They usually have fifteen members per class year. They "tap" their members, mostly on the same "Tap Night", and a member is off-limits to recruitment by another secret society (i.e., reciprocal exclusivity). The normal pattern now is that a group of secret societies places an advertisement in the Yale Daily News in early spring that informs students when Tap Night is taking place and when students should expect to receive formal offers (usually one week before official Tap Night). Tap Night is typically held on a Thursday in mid-April.

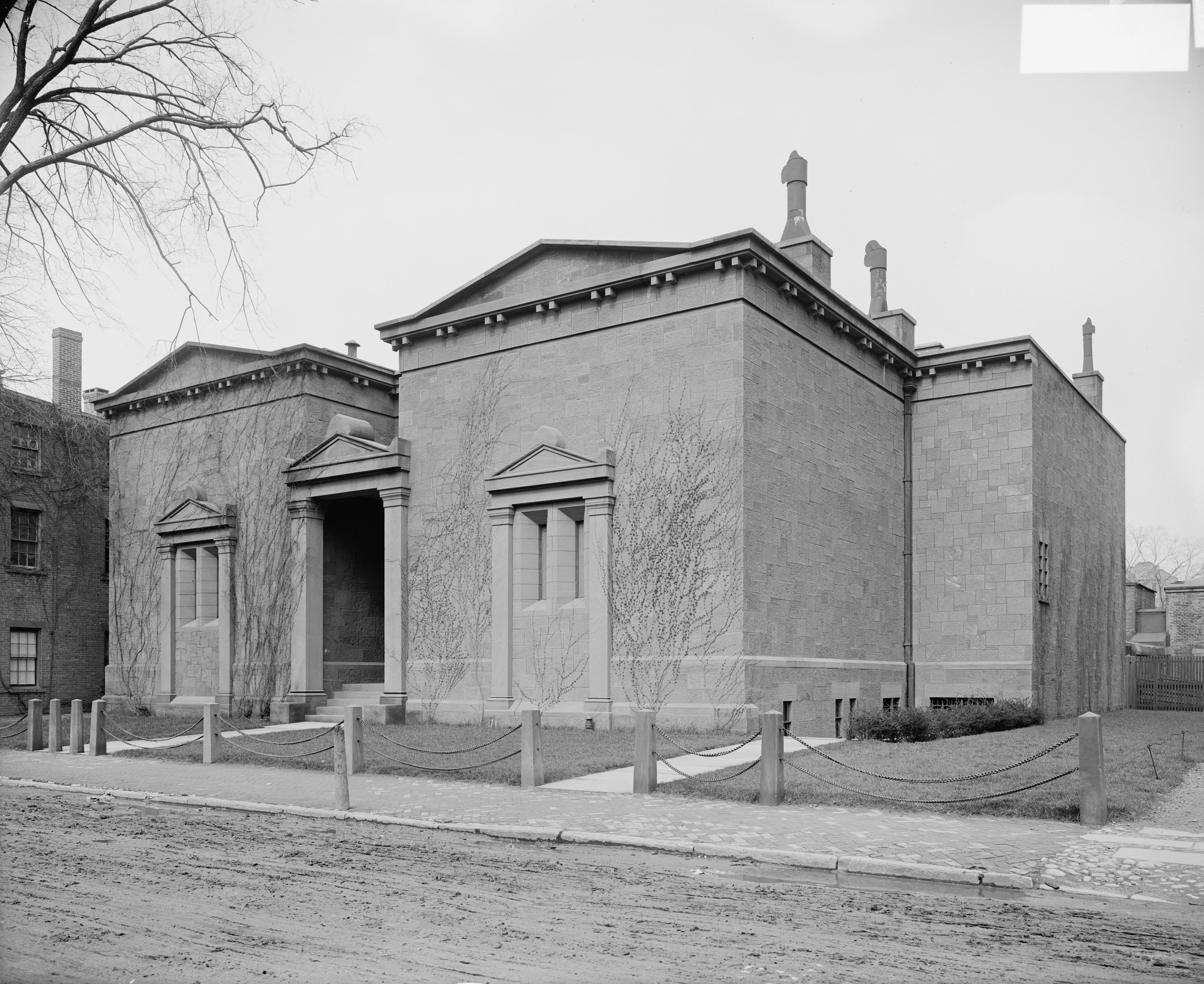
Skull and Bones "tomb"

During 1854–1956, the Sheffield Scientific School was the sciences and engineering college of Yale University, and it also had a fraternal culture that differed in some respects from the humanities campus. Many societies have owned meeting halls, with different accommodations. Following the example of Skull & Bones, the halls are often referred to as tombs. A series of articles on Dartmouth and Yale secret-society architecture provides an overview of the buildings. Societies that own tombs or halls are sometimes known as "landed' societies.

The four oldest landed societies continuously affiliated with Yale College are Skull and Bones (1832); Scroll and Key (1841); Spade and Grave (1864); and Wolf's Head (1883). Elihu (1903), the fifth oldest landed society in its association with Yale College, was founded as an "open senior society," i.e. not secret. The surviving landed Sheffield School societies became affiliated with Yale College by 1945, when the last separate Yale degrees with a Sheffield designation were awarded. They are Berzelius (1848), St. Anthony Hall (1867), Book and Snake (1863), St. Elmo (1889), and the Aurelian Honor Society (1910).

In the past century, the size of Yale has allowed for a wider variety of student societies, including regular college fraternity chapters and other models, so it can be challenging to categorize the organizations. There are some societies that cross ordinary categories such as Sage and Chalice, a newer society that is less selective, and Brothers in Unity, which formed as a literary and debating society in 1768. Three newer societies that own property include Elihu, Manuscript Society (1952), and Mace and Chain (1956). Yale's Buildings and Grounds Department lists the societies with halls in its online architectural database.

== List of North American collegiate secret societies ==
Name	Charter date and range	Founding institution	State or province	Membership	Ref.
A.N.G.E.L.S. Society	1998	University of Virginia	Virginia		
Abaris	1996	Dartmouth College	New Hampshire	Coeducational	
Alpha	1918	College of William & Mary	Virginia	Women	
Anak Society	1908	Georgia Tech	Georgia	Junior and seniors	
Andiron Club	1907	New York University	New York	Males	
Berzelius Society	1848	Yale University	Connecticut	Seniors	
Bishop James Madison Society	1812	College of William & Mary	Virginia		
Book and Snake	1863	Yale University	Connecticut	Seniors	
Burning Spear Society	1993	Florida State University	Florida	Seniors	
Cadaver Society	1957	Washington and Lee University	Virginia		
Cater Society	1982	Auburn University	Alabama	Senior women	
CHI	1900	Longwood University	Virginia	Coeducational	
Chimera	1914	Dartmouth College	New Hampshire	Coeducational	
Coffin and Keys	1916	University of Nevada, Reno	Nevada	Males	
The Cord	1881	College of William & Mary	Virginia		
CWEST	1979	University of Cincinnati	Ohio	Females	
Deru	1896	Northwestern University	Illinois	Seniors	
Desmos	1951	Yale University	Connecticut	Seniors	
Dragon Society	1950	Binghamton University	New York	Upperclassmen	
Dragon Society	1898	Dartmouth College	New Hampshire	Senior men	
Ducemus	190x ?	Emory University	Georgia	Seniors	
Eli Banana	1878	University of Virginia	Virginia		
DVS Senior Honor Society	1900	Emory University	Georgia	Seniors	
Episkopon	1858–c. 2020	Trinity College, Toronto	Ontario	Men and women	
Flat Hat Club	1750–1781, 1920–1943, 1972	College of William & Mary	Virginia	Upperclassmen	
Gridiron	1908	University of Georgia	Georgia	Males	
Griffin	1995	Dartmouth College	New Hampshire	Seniors	
The Guild	200x ?	University of North Carolina at Greensboro	North Carolina		
Gun Club	1912	University of California, Berkeley	California	Law school	
Ink and Needle	1998	Yale University	Connecticut	Seniors	
IMP Society	1902	University of Virginia	Virginia		
Iron Key	1910	Purdue University	Indiana	Seniors	
Iron Shield Society	1902	University of Wisconsin–Madison	Wisconsin	Junior and seniors	
Iron Wedge	1911–197x ?, 1985	University of Minnesota	Minnesota	Junior and seniors	(Note: Was originally an honor society but is now a secret society.)
Jasons Senior Men's Honorary	1914	University of Alabama	Alabama	Senior	
Lantern Society	2000	University of Virginia	Virginia		
LC	2008	Yale University	Connecticut	Seniors	
Leviathan	2007	Yale University	Connecticut	Seniors	
Linonian Society	1753–1872, 2008	Yale University	Connecticut	Seniors and graduate students	
Lion's Paw	1908	Pennsylvania State University	Pennsylvania	Seniors	
Live Oak Society		College of William & Mary	Virginia		
Loyal Knights of Old Trusty	1920	University of Oklahoma	Oklahoma	Engineering students	
Ma-Wan-Da	1912	University of Illinois at Urbana–Champaign	Illinois	Seniors	
Mace and Chain	1956–1960x ?, 199x ?	Yale University	Connecticut	Seniors	
Magnolia Society		Furman University	South Carolina		
Medusa Society	1892–1971	Trinity College	Connecticut		
Men of Metro	1946	University of Cincinnati	Ohio	Men,	
Mufti	1958	Pomona College	California		
Myskania	1917	University at Albany	New York		
Mystical Seven	1907	University of Missouri	Missouri	Seniors	
Myth and Sword	1990s	Yale University	Connecticut	Seniors	
Nacoms	1898	Columbia University	New York	Seniors	
The NoZe Brotherhood	1924	Baylor University	Texas		
OBC	1960	University of North Carolina at Asheville	North Carolina		
Olympus	2014	Dartmouth College	New Hampshire	Seniors	
Order of Ammon	2005	Emory University	Georgia	Juniors and seniors	
Order of Gimghoul	1889	University of North Carolina at Chapel Hill	North Carolina	Seniors	
Order of the Bull's Blood	1834	Rutgers University	New Jersey		
Order of the Claw and Dagger	2006	University of Virginia	Virginia	McIntire School of Commerce students	
Order of the Druids	1916	University of Pittsburgh	Pennsylvania		
Order of the Golden Fleece	1904	University of North Carolina at Chapel Hill	North Carolina	Seniors	
Order of the Grail-Valkyries	1920	University of North Carolina at Chapel Hill	North Carolina	Seniors	
Order of the Greek Horsemen	1955	University of Georgia	Georgia	Fraternity men	
Order of the Hippo	1996	George Washington University	Washington, D.C.		
Osirus	2016	Dartmouth College	New Hampshire	Seniors	
Osirus (society)	1904-1969	Massachusetts Institute of Technology	Massachusetts		
O.W.L. Society	1887	University of Virginia	Virginia		
P.D.A.	1773	College of William & Mary	Virginia		
Paladin Society	1998	Emory University	Georgia	Juniors and seniors	
Palladia	March 11, 1978	University of Georgia	Georgia	Females	
Parmi Nous	1907	Pennsylvania State University	Pennsylvania	Seniors	
Phi Society		University of Virginia	Virginia		
Phoenix	1982	Dartmouth College	New Hampshire	Senior women	
Phrygian	2005	Dartmouth College	New Hampshire	Seniors	
Princeps	1992	Longwood University	Virginia	Coeducational	
P.U.M.P.K.I.N.	c. 1967	University of Virginia	Virginia		
The Pundits	1884	Yale University	Connecticut	Seniors	
QEBH	1897	University of Missouri	Missouri	Seniors	
Red Dragon Society	1898	New York University	New York	Seniors, coeducational	
Rotunda Burning Society	c. 1981	University of Virginia	Virginia		
Rutherford B. Hayes Society	1893	Ohio State University	Ohio	Undergraduate and graduate students	
Sachems	1915	Columbia University	New York	Seniors	
St. Elmo Society	1899	Yale University	Connecticut	Seniors	
Scarabbean Senior Society	1915	University of Tennessee	Tennessee	Seniors	
Scarlet Order	1992	Ohio State University	Ohio		
Scroll and Key	1842	Yale University	Connecticut	Seniors	
Septagram Society		Virginia Tech	Virginia		
Seven Society	1905	University of Virginia	Virginia		
Seven Society, Order of the Crown & Dagger	1905	College of William & Mary	Virginia	Senior men	
Sherman Ave	2009	Northwestern University	Illinois		
Sigma Phi	1996	University of Cincinnati	Ohio	Women	
Sigma Society	1880	Washington and Lee University	Virginia		
Skull	1911	Worcester Polytechnic Institute	Massachusetts	Seniors	
Skull and Bones	1832	Yale University	Connecticut	Seniors	
Skull and Bones Senior Honor Society	1912	Pennsylvania State University	Pennsylvania	Juniors and seniors	
Skull and Serpent Society	1865	Wesleyan University	Connecticut		
Skulls of Seven	1898	Westminster College	Missouri	Seniors	
Societas Domi Pacificae	1824	Brown University	Rhode Island	Seniors	
Society of the Purple Shadows	1963	University of Virginia	Virginia		
Society of Thoth	1926	University of British Columbia	British Columbia		
Sons and Daughters of Liberty	2003	University of Virginia	Virginia		
Spade and Grave	1864–1871, 1951	Yale University	Connecticut	Seniors	
The Spades	1915	Auburn University	Alabama	Seniors	
Speculum		Emory University	Georgia		
Sphinx	1990	Yale University	Connecticut	Senior Women	
Sphinx	1885	Dartmouth College	New Hampshire	Senior men	
Stewards Society	1982	Georgetown University	Washington, D.C.	Sophomores, juniors, and seniors	
T.I.L.K.A.	1889	University of Virginia	Virginia		
The Thirteen Club	1890	College of William & Mary	Virginia		
The Thirteen Society	1889	University of Virginia	Virginia		
Thursdays Society	1970s	University of Virginia	Virginia		
Tiger Brotherhood	1928–2017	Clemson University	South Carolina		
Order of the Golden Bear	1900	University of California, Berkeley	California	Community leaders	
Torch Honor Society	1916–196x ?, 1995	Yale University	Connecticut	Seniors	
Trident Society	1933	Duke University	North Carolina		
The 21 Society	1999	University of Virginia	Virginia		
Vulcan Senior Engineering Society	1904	University of Michigan	Michigan	Senior engineering students	
Wolf's Head	1883	Yale University	Connecticut	Seniors	
W Society		College of William & Mary	Virginia	Freshmen	
Wren Society	1832	College of William & Mary	Virginia		
Z Society	1892	University of Virginia	Virginia		
Zodiac Society		College of William & Mary	Virginia		
Florida Blue Key	1923	University of Florida	Florida	Upperclassmen	

== See also ==
- High school secret societies
- List of senior societies
- Secret societies

== Bibliography ==
- Robbins, Alexandra (2004). Pledged: The Secret Life of Sororities. New York, NY: Hyperion. ISBN 978-0-7868-8859-7.
- Winks, Robin W. (1996). Cloak and Gown: Scholars in the Secret War, 1939-1961. New Haven, CT: Yale University Press; 2nd edition. ISBN 978-0-300-06524-4.
