= Order of Ammon =

Secret society at Emory University, US

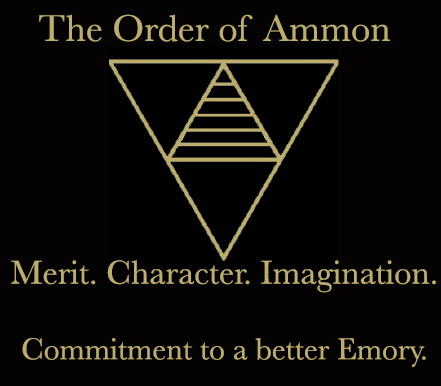
- Founded: 19xx ?; Reestablished 2005; 21 years ago Emory University
- Type: Secret
- Affiliation: Independent
- Status: Active
- Scope: Local
- Motto: "Commitment to a better Emory"
- Pillars: Merit. Character. Imagination.
- Chapters: 1
- Patron Divinity: Amun
- Headquarters: Atlanta, Georgia; United States

The Order of Ammon is a secret society for seniors at Emory University in Atlanta, Georgia. Membership in the group is a secret for life.

== History ==
Although the Order of Ammon existed on the Emory University campus in the past, its history is relatively unknown. In 1998, the Order of Ammon sent a letter to the university, calling the other secret societies "juvenile" and "pretentious". The Order also challenged the other groups to "make their presence known on campus".

The Order of Ammon was officially re-chartered and recognized by Emory University in 2005. The Order of Ammon is the newest of the four secret societies at Emory University, which also include Paladin Society, D.V.S. Senior Honor Society, and Ducemus.

The group meets infrequently, as needed to respond to university issues. It uses electronic communication and social media to communicate with the entire campus community.

== Symbols ==
The society is named after Ammon or Amun, an Egyptian god. He was selected because he was said to be invisible, omnipotent, and omniscient—characteristics that the society aspires to have. Its pillars are "Merit. Character, Imagination" and, its motto is "Commitment to a better Emory".

== Membership ==
The active members of the society consist of seven seniors. Students who are selected for the Order of Ammon based on" merit, character, imagination, and persistent commitment to better Emory University and the world-at-large". Members are usually involved in campus organizations or athletics and have demonstrated excellence in academics, leadership, and service.

The members of The Order of Ammon are never revealed, a nod to notable Emory University alumni Robert W. Woodruff, who said: "there is no limit to what a man can do or where he can go if he doesn't mind who gets the credit." This differs from the Paladin Society and D.V.S. Senior Honor Society, which reveal their members during graduation.
