= Blue Castle =

Blue Castle may refer to:

- The Blue Castle, a 1926 novel by Lucy Maud Montgomery
- Blue Castle, a nickname for the Washington and Georgetown Railroad Car House in Washington, D.C., United States
- Blue Castle Games, the former name of Capcom Vancouver, a video game developer in Burnaby, British Columbia, Canada
- Blue Castle Project, a proposed nuclear power plant near Green River, Utah, United States

== See also ==
- OBC (secret society), the Order of the Blue Castle
