= Dragon Society =

Dragon Society may refer to:

== Organizations ==
- Dragon Society (Dartmouth College)
- Dragon Society (Binghamton University)

== Books ==
- The Dragon Society (novel)
