= Red Dragon Society =

Secret society at New York University

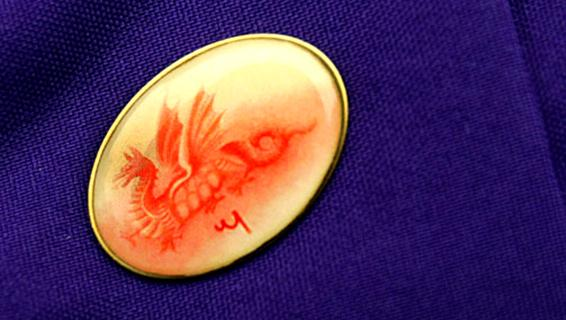
- Founded: 1898; 127 years ago New York University
- Type: Senior society
- Affiliation: Independent
- Status: Active
- Scope: Local
- Chapters: 61
- Headquarters: New York City, New York; United States

The Red Dragon Society is a secret society for seniors based at New York University, in New York, New York. The Red Dragon has long held the title to the most selective society at NYU, and has been known for its secrecy since its founding in 1898.

== History ==
The Red Dragon Society was founded in 1898 upon the transfer of NYU's undergraduate college from Washington Square to University Heights. The Society inducts only rising seniors from the College of Arts and Science prior to their graduation.

The Red Dragon is NYU's fourth oldest and perhaps most well known senior society. It was founded to create a robust network for the most distinguished students in the senior class of the College of Arts and Science, and it continues to pursue this goal today. The Red Dragon is thought to be the most selective society at NYU, tapping only a small group of rising seniors for membership each year. While the precise requirements to be inducted as a "Dragon" are largely unknown to those outside the society, the Red Dragon emphasizes the following qualities: academic excellence, a commitment to the betterment of the school and community, a non-intuitive sense of leadership, and dedication to moral action. The society is known for valuing merit above all else, and to date it is the only secret society at NYU that inducts both women and men.

There is little publicly available information about the specific traditions and practices of the society, but lists of new members have been published sporadically over the last century. Membership was historically published in NYU's yearbook, Violet.

Today, the Red Dragon tends to maintain a relatively low profile on campus, but periodically makes its presence known. In January 2004, the Bun, an NYU icon, disappeared from College of Arts and Science Dean Matthew Santirocco's desk. Days later, the dean received a ransom note reading, "I have the bun." The "Bun Bandits" remained at large for several months and occasionally sent the Dean photos and kidnap notes. Eventually, a member of the Society facilitated its safe return to Dean Santirocco.

== Membership ==
Members have historically been inducted from the Junior class at the end of each school year. New inductees are selected utilizing an ancient (and still) secret formula by members of the Society. By reputation, "Dragons" tapped are mavericks in some way. Little is known about this process, but membership is not a closely guarded secret. In addition to the periodic publication of the society's roster, Dragons can be identified at University events, such as commencement ceremonies in Washington Square Park, with Red Dragon Society pins.

== Notable members ==
The Red Dragon Society boasts many of NYU's most influential alumni as members. These include some of America's most prominent doctors, attorneys, politicians, business people, and artists, including early members Henry Noble MacCracken (B.A. 1900), Reinald Werrenrath (B.A. 1906), and William Henry Draper Jr. (B.A. 1916). The society also maintains a faculty roster. The 1934 NYU yearbook lists Elmer Ellsworth Brown, Howard Cann, and Theodore Distler amongst the faculty associated with the Society.

== See also ==
- Collegiate secret societies in North America
- Secret society
