= Sigma Society =

American collegiate secret society

- Σ
- Founded: 1880; 146 years ago Washington and Lee University
- Type: Senior society
- Affiliation: Independent
- Status: Active
- Scope: Local
- Chapters: 1
- Nickname: Sigma, Washington Society
- Headquarters: Lexington, Virginia; United States

The Sigma Society is a secret senior society at Washington and Lee University in Lexington, Virginia. Founded around 1880, it is the oldest society in operation at the university.

== History ==
The Sigma Society was founded at Washington and Lee University in 1880. It was considered a senior ribbon society. Its membership typically consists of twelve to fifteen students.

Though qualifications for membership are not published, members historically consistently comprised the top students on the campus, rated by overall strength rather than academics. In its early decades, the society's members were mostly athletes.

In December 1996, the Ring-tum Phi student newspaper reported that the Sigma Society had a reputation for hazing that was often worse than that of the campus fraternities.

== Symbols and traditions ==
The society's symbol is the Greek capital letter Sigma (Σ). Its members received a button bearing the Σ. The Sigma was also branded on the stomach or right groin of members. Jane Horton-Marcella, campus student health physician, wrote a letter to the student newspaper in November 1988, noting that Sigma Society was branding its initiates; she had assisted two students the prior year with infections from this branding.

The society's annual initiation ceremony takes place on George Washington's birthday—February, 22. The organization is often referred to as the "Washington Society."

The "P.A.M.O.L.A. R.Y.E." emblem that is often found inscribed on chairs, desks, and in bathroom stalls throughout the university campus and greater Lexington area is related to the society and was referenced in the group's yearbook page in 1974.

== Activities ==
Although the society's membership is public, the inner workings of the group remain unknown. In the early 20th century, the group held well-attended balls annually, including its annual German (a formal dance) and its Easter Ball. It had a reputation as a "campus drinking and socializing club" according to William Rehnquist, former chief justice of the U.S. Supreme Court. However, a rocky relationship with the administration forced the group to remove itself from active university participation in the 1930s.

The Sigma Society donated a plaque to the university to commemorate two alumni who died in World War I: Clovis Moomaw, a member of the law school class of 1912, and James Arthur Lingle Jr., law school class of 1915. The bronze plaque was originally installed in Lee Chapel but was moved to Washington and Lee's Memorial Gateway in October 2022.

== Sigma Cabin ==
Historically, Sigma Society met in the Sigma Cabin on campus. The university paid the Sigma Society $15,000 ($32583 in today's money) when it tore down the Sigma Cabin in 1994. The university needed the land to build the Telford Science Library.

A plaque at the Telford Science Library commemorates the former Sigma Cabin, reading: "Near this site stood the cabin which, for more than sixty years, was the meeting place for members of the Sigma Society…Founded in 1880, the Sigma Society is one of the oldest, continuous social organizations at W&L."

== Prominent members ==
- Harry "Cy" Young, Washington and Lee Class of 1917
- Dick Boisseau, professional football player
- Justice Lewis Powell Jr., associate justice of the Supreme Court of the United States, Washington and Lee Class of 1929

== See also ==
- Collegiate secret societies in North America
- Secret society
