= Societas Domi Pacificae =

Secret society at Brown University, US

- Founded: 1824; 202 years ago Brown University
- Type: Secret
- Affiliation: Independent
- Status: Active
- Scope: Local
- Motto: Scientia Potentia Est (“Knowledge is Power”)
- Chapters: 1
- Nickname: The Pacifica House, SDP
- Former name: The Franklin Society
- Headquarters: Providence, Rhode Island; United States

Societas Domi Pacificae, colloquially known as The Pacifica House or SDP, is a secret society based at Brown University, in Providence, Rhode Island, and is the oldest student secret society in the United States. Organized in 1824 as The Franklin Society, it was created in a year when such a large class entered Brown University that the two existing literary debating societies, the Philermenian Society and the United Brothers Society could not accommodate the new students. Notable personages such as Thomas Jefferson, John Quincy Adams, and Henry Clay accepted honorary membership into the society during this time. The society was founded with the motto: Scientia Potentia Est, meaning “Knowledge is Power.”

Martha Mitchell's research in the Encyclopedia Brunoniana indicated that the society was dissolved some time in the 1840s. However, there is at least one reference that seems to indicate it is possible the society existed at least until the late 19th century: "It is believed to have been the first society organization in this city to institute a course of popular lectures for the public entertainment and instruction. Through its lectures it has introduced to the citizens some of the most noted scientists of the world."

== History ==
The Franklin Society Coat of Arms

Records indicate that ten years after its establishment, in 1834, a select core of students in the Franklin Society recognized that the quality of members had diminished due to competition with the other two literary societies and the new emergence and popularity of Fraternities. Recognizing a loss of general integrity within the Society, the Franklin Society was dissolved, its library of several hundred volumes was turned over to the College Library, and in 1847 its members were elected in equal proportions into the two older societies. Save a few references in the 19th century, the Franklin Society's presence and impact on the campus is unknown and undocumented.

=== Continued evidence of activity ===
The small bit that is known seems to indicate that the Franklin Society was originally "devoted especially to the study of natural science and the mechanic arts," Further, that in 1887, the Franklin Society commissioned a "Report of the Committee on the geology of Rhode Island." These references seem to indicate a continued presence of the society beyond 1834, when it was believed to have been dissolved.

== Coat of arms ==
The Franklin Society coat of arms consisted of three golden key intersecting each other, with the Brown crest in the background. The Brown crest serves as a tribute to the university, while the three keys are distinctly Franklin symbols. The three keys, partially references to Benjamin Franklin's electricity experiment involving a key and a kite, are said to represent Science, Reason and Action.

It is not possible that this is the same seal that was used when the society was founded, as the Brown University seal was that of the College of Rhode Island until 1844. However, it is possible that this seal was used from that point onward.

== See also ==
- Collegiate secret societies in North America
