= Gimghoul Neighborhood Historic District =

Historic house in North Carolina, United States

- U.S. National Register of Historic Places
- U.S. Historic district
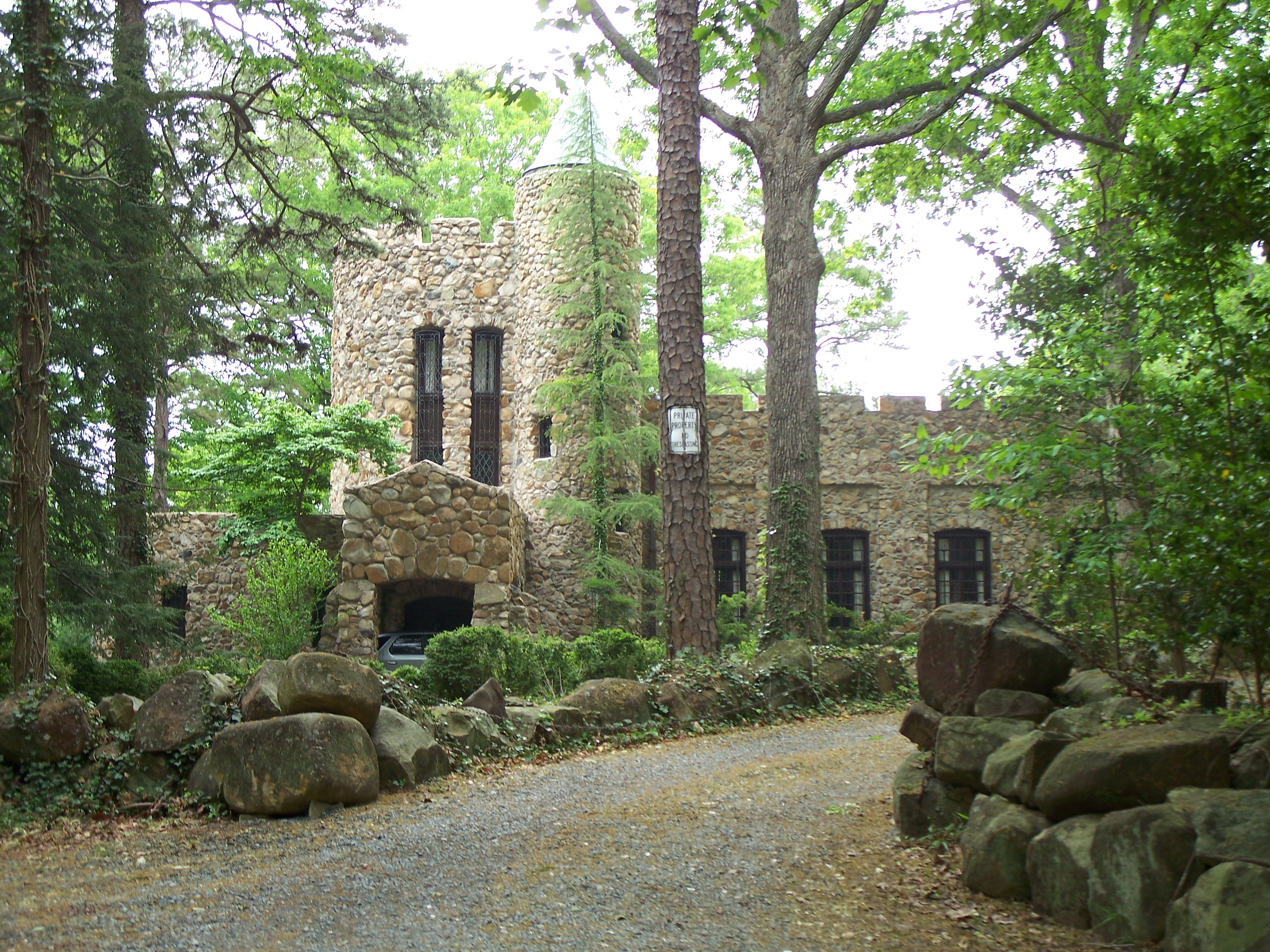
- Hippol Castle, headquarters of the Order of Gimghoul

- Location within North Carolina Location within the United States
- Location: Roughly bounded by Gimghoul Rd., Ridge Ln., and Gladon Dr., Chapel Hill, North Carolina
- Coordinates: 35.91282°N 79.03917°W
- Area: 35 acres (14 ha)
- Built: 1924
- Architects: Atwood, Thomas C.; Barber, Mr.
- Architectural style: Colonial Revival, Bungalow/craftsman
- NRHP reference No.: 93000807
- Added to NRHP: August 5, 1993

Gimghoul Neighborhood Historic District is a national historic district located in Chapel Hill, Orange County, North Carolina. The district encompasses 42 contributing buildings and one contributing structure in a residential area of Chapel Hill. Gimghoul Neighborhood was developed after 1924 as faculty housing and includes notable examples of Colonial Revival and Bungalow / American Craftsman style architecture. The Order of Gimghoul sold the land, about 35 acres, for development to help fund the construction of neighboring Hippol Castle.

It was listed on the National Register of Historic Places in 1993.
