= Medusa Society =

Secret society at Trinity College, US

- Founded: June 1892; 133 years ago Trinity College
- Type: Secret
- Affiliation: Independent
- Status: Active
- Defunct date: c. 1971
- Emphasis: Senior
- Scope: Local
- Chapters: 1
- Headquarters: Hartford, Connecticut; United States

The Medusa Society was an undergraduate secret society at Trinity College, Hartford, Connecticut. Though non-continuous in its presence on campus, it had a purported founding date of 1840. It went inactive in the 1970s.

== History ==
Modeled on the senior societies at Yale, Medusa was founded at Trinity in June 1892 by a group of eighteen juniors as a student governmental body and honor society "responsible for the maintenance of College tradition." This organization was believed to be the direct successor to the Grand Tribunal, an institution founded at Washington College in 1840 by seniors and juniors as a rudimentary form of student government which had ceased to exist by 1890.

As an underground society in its current state, the Medusa maintains a high level of secrecy on Trinity's campus and is not recognized by Trinity College. Most information about the society is learned through word of mouth. Medusa members acknowledge each other through a system of archaic hand gestures and expressions that are known only to members.

== Symbols and traditions ==
The members wore pins bearing the head of Medusa, which lent its name to the society.

== Membership ==
Throughout the 20th Century, membership of the Medusa represented "the campus sophisticate who had shown enough ingenuity to have himself 'tapped,'"—"tapping" referring to the public initiations which occurred on the Quad near the end of each spring semester. This public display differed greatly from those of the 19th Century Tribunal, whose clandestine ceremonies "were conducted at night with elaborate and mysterious incantations, replete with coffin, human skeleton, sacred seals, and liquid flame, [which] attracted much attention from the Hartford townsfolk."

The initiation ceremonies became well known on campus up until the 1960s, attesting to the prestige of its members. In Trinity College in the Twentieth Century, it is explained that "there was occasional criticism of the Medusa's exclusiveness, and there was some dissatisfaction with the Medusa's having designated itself as the senior honorary society."

== Activity ==
Prior to its dissolution, the tapping ceremony was a yearly tradition that all students looked forward to. Taking place in the spring before the statue of Bishop Brownell, outgoing members of the society tapped seven juniors who had especially distinguished themselves in their first three years at Trinity. "Originally [...] the supreme adjudicative system on campus," a gradual shift in authority to the student government ultimately led to the obsolescence of the Medusa's presence on campus after 1968. In the decades that followed, various attempts by students were made sporadically to revive the Medusa, each time with a new mission statement. The last public manifestation saw Medusa as a platform for course evaluations in 1971.
