= Trident Society =

Secret society at Duke University

- TS
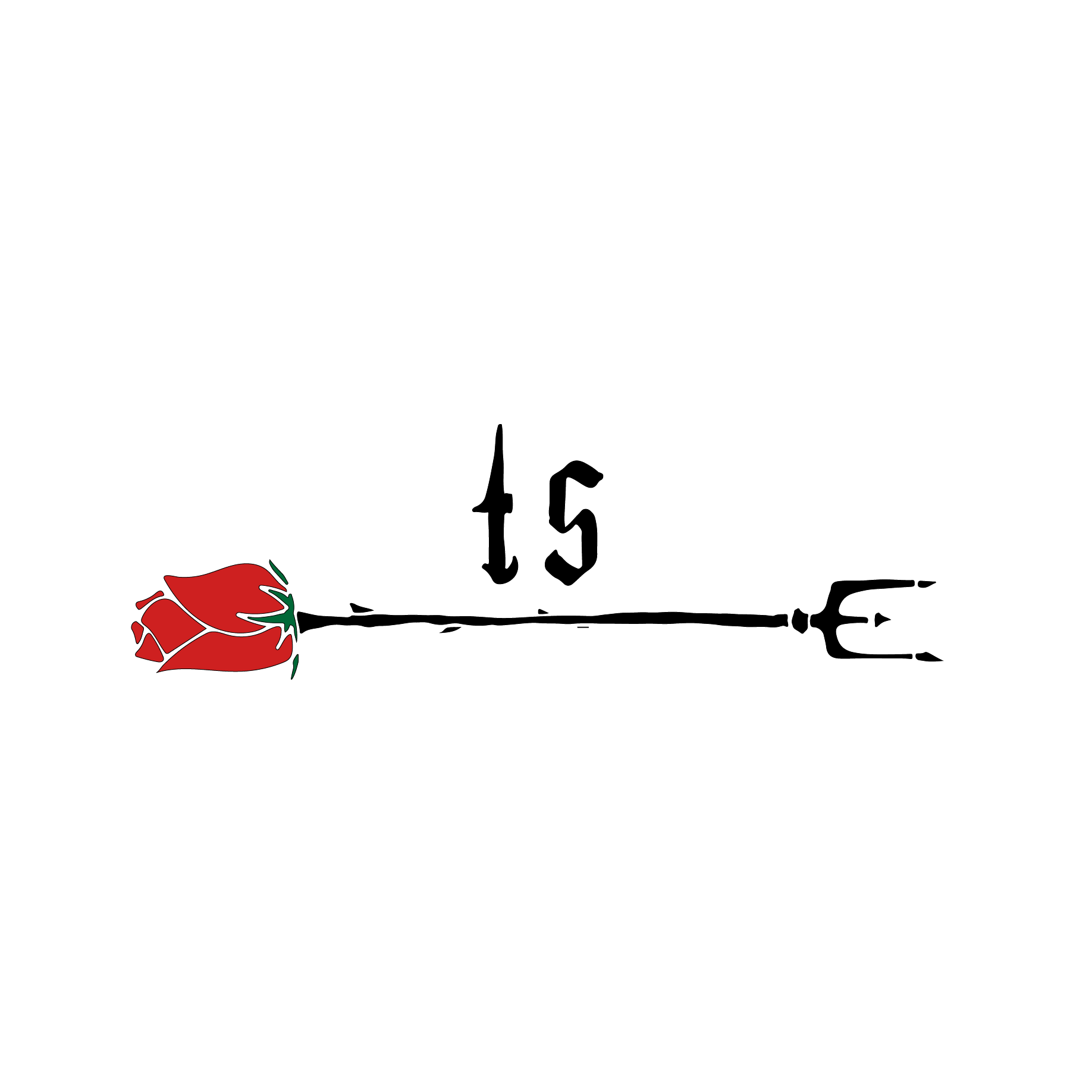
- Founded: c.1933; 93 years ago Duke University
- Type: Secret
- Affiliation: Independent
- Status: Active
- Scope: Local
- Flower: Red rose
- Chapters: 1
- Headquarters: Durham, North Carolina; United States

The Trident Society, also known as TS, is a collegiate secret society at Duke University in Durham, North Carolina.

== History ==
The Trident Society is a secret society at Duke University. While its origins are largely unknown, it is believed to have been founded as an all-male organization in the early 1930s, forming during the dissolutions of the Red Friars and the White Duchy student societies. The Trident Society is considered the most secretive and prestigious of the societies at Duke University.

Membership in the society is strictly secret. A November 2007 edition of Rival Magazine explained the group's philosophy. According to a "cryptic letter sealed with wax," the society is "rooted in ideals that stretch back to the university's founding." The letter continued: "Our founders recognized that similar institutions existed at other top universities (Skull and Bones at Yale, The Sevens at the University of Virginia, Quill and Dagger at Cornell) and saw a void to fill at Duke." As such, on-campus members are not typically public about their membership in the society.

== Symbols and traditions ==
The Trident Society uses the lowercase letters "ts" over a pitchfork, capped with a red rose, as its symbol. The "Charley Bell," located within Kilgo quad on the Duke campus, was a gift from former society members and is controlled exclusively by the society. The reasons for the use of the Charley Bell remain unknown, though it is reported that it rings upon initiation "on the first Thursday in May." The Trident Society uses the Duke Chapel for its initiation rites. Before initiation, members must solve a series of riddles.

== Activities ==
The Trident Society largely works behind the scenes, and the extent of its power and influence is largely unknown. A member of the group notes, "The individual contributions (of Trident Society members) effect change." A 2008 story in The Chronicle claims that members of the society often develop strong relationships with administrators and use this influence to enact change across the campus, unknown to the general population.

The society leaves a rose and a letter welcoming first-year students to the campus during the first few weeks of every academic year. The letter is usually found on the steps of Lilly Library or the East Campus Marketplace.

The society's alumni help ensure the integrity of the society and provide financial support for its activities. This enables the society to provide substantial financial scholarships for students.

== Membership ==
The Trident Society was historically an all-male organization but is now co-educational. It is believed that each year, the society selects, or taps, five to ten members. The members of the society maintain a strict silence about their membership and the group's mission.

== Notable members ==
Trident Society's alumni include recipients of the Rhodes Scholarship, Marshall Scholarship, Truman Scholarship, Angier B. Duke Scholarship, Benjamin Newton Duke Scholarship, basketball players, and leaders of the largest or most influential campus organizations such as the student government, the University Union, The Chronicle (newspaper), and the Interfraternity Council. Trident Society alumni have served on the Duke University Board of Trustees.
