= Society of Thoth =

Canadian collegiate secret society

- Θώθ
- Founded: 1926; 100 years ago University of British Columbia
- Type: Secret
- Affiliation: Independent
- Status: Active
- Scope: Local
- Chapters: 1
- Headquarters: Vancouver, British Columbia; Canada

The Society of Thoth (Greek: Θώθ) was a secret society at the University of British Columbia in Vancouver, British Columbia, Canada.

== History ==
The Society of Thoth was founded in 1926 by members of the Ubyssey student paper at the University of British Columbia as an "honorary journalistic society" devoted to "increasing the gaiety of nations, by the development of wit and humor." Members later acknowledged "that the journalistic objects of this society" were "second to its other aims; namely to the assisting in the development of University spirit."

The club first gained notoriety on campus for its 'Royal Egyptian' pantomime at UBC's annual Homecoming Night. Membership in the society, often predicated on academic achievement or campus leadership, was initially restricted to men and determined by a 'Grand Scribe' and a board of directors. Members remained secretive about the club's "awesome and terrifying ceremony of initiation," having sworn an oath of secrecy. The society's meetings were held on the Point Grey campus in secret. Member and UBC classics professor Malcolm McGregor has claimed that club members were the "first habitues of what is now Wreck Beach."

== Notable members ==
Rumored members include former Ubyssey staffers Earle Birney, John Turner and Pierre Berton.
