= Iron Shield Society =

University of Wisconsin–Madison secret society

- Founded: 1902; 124 years ago University of Wisconsin–Madison
- Type: Honor
- Affiliation: Independent
- Status: Active
- Emphasis: Juniors and Seniors
- Scope: Local
- Chapters: 1
- Headquarters: Madison, Wisconsin; United States
- Website: union.wisc.edu/get-involved/iron-shield-society/

The Iron Shield Society, formerly the Iron Cross Society, is an exclusive undergraduate honors society at the University of Wisconsin–Madison.

The student organization was historically a secret society but the existence of the organization is now public and its members are publicly identified on their website. Society inductees who have graduated are also honored by having their names listed at the Memorial Union.

== History ==
The Iron Shield Society was founded in 1902. The most visible accomplishment of Iron Shield is the founding of the Memorial Union. In 1907, the UW–Madison president asked Iron Shield members to help convert the failing Madison YMCA into a more meaningful student institution.

Initially only open to men in their senior year of college, The Iron Shield later allowed both juniors and women to join.

In 2011, the Iron Shield published an endorsement of the Wisconsin Idea in the Badger Herald. The open letter exhorted students to not just plug themselves into existing community organizations but to also think critically about which of their community's needs are not currently being met and how the skills learned in college could help students address those needs.

In 2020, the organization decided to change its name from the Iron Cross Society to the Iron Shield Society to remove potential confusion of association with the Nazi Iron Cross or Neo-Nazi organizations using the "Iron Cross" name.

== Membership ==
Membership is open to men and women who are juniors or seniors. Unlike other UW–Madison honor societies, faculty, academic staff, student leaders, and student organizations all make nominations to the Iron Shield Society. The exact selection process is not known, but students' extracurricular, community accomplishments, and (to a lesser extent) GPA are taken into consideration. Nominations can be made via online form.

== Notable alumni ==
- Kathy Cramer (1994), professor in the political science department at the University of Wisconsin–Madison
- Russ Feingold (1975), United States Senator and Wisconsin State Senator
- Nathan Heffernan (1942), former Wisconsin Supreme Court Chief Justice
- William Beverly Murphy (1928), former president and CEO of Campbell's
- Pat Richter (1963), former professional football player and athletic administrator.

== See also ==
- Collegiate secret societies in North America
