= College of William & Mary secret societies =

A number of secret societies operate at the College of William & Mary in Williamsburg, Virginia, dating back to the founding of the nation's first known collegiate secret society, The F. H. C. Society, founded on November 11, 1750. Today several secret societies are known (or believed) to exist at the college, including Bishop James Madison Society, the Flat Hat Club, the Ladies of Alpha, the Live Oak Society, the Phi Society, the Seven Society, the Society, the 13 Club, the W Society, the Wren Society, and the Zodiac Society.

Known inactive groups include the B.B. Club, which was active in the 1920s, and P.D.A., an 18th-century society.

== Flat Hat Club ==
The F. H. C. Society was founded on November 11, 1750, under a secret Latin name, possibly Fraternitas, Humanitas, et Cognitio, Fraternitas Humanitas Cognitioque, or variations thereof. The club was informally referred to as the Flat Hat Club. Its members included St. George Tucker, Thomas Jefferson and George Wythe. It was reformed in 1920s and operated until 1943. In 1972, the society was reformed. According to The Flat Hat (a largely unaffiliated student newspaper), "new members are selected by those currently in the group. Historically, the group has tapped student government leaders, as well as several members of The Flat Hat [newspaper], which took its name from the historic group." The F.H.C. Society's operations remain cloaked in secrecy, but remain committed to philanthropy impacting the William & Mary community.

== 7 Society ==
The 7 Society is a senior-class society founded in 1826. It is believed to be the longest continuously run secret society at William & Mary. Its seven members, selected in their junior year, work to honor and encourage those who help strengthen the university, often through gifts. In 2003, the Sevens left dozens of umbrellas for the Admissions Office to use during rainy campus tours; the umbrellas were decorated with the insignia of the Sevens. Historically, the society formally announced its members' identities as they graduated. In recent years, however, membership has become steeped in mystery—being only revealed in the event of death.

There are several other secret societies with the word "seven" in their name, though there is no known evidence connecting the groups. One such society is the Seven Society at University of Virginia, founded in 1905, also noted for its philanthropic practices.

== 13 Club ==
Given the society's name, the 13 Club, founded in 1890 and reactivated in 1994, is presumed to have thirteen members. Little information has been made public regarding their campus activities. The society maintains such a high level of secrecy that even members' wives and children are unaware of their membership. Such was the case of Louise Kale, Director of William & Mary's Historic Campus, who only became aware of her father's membership after his death. Although club membership and activities are kept secret, the 13s have allowed for outside communication through their campaign "Be Here Now" and campus speaker series "One Last Thing." In historical archives, a photo of their members was published in the 1939 edition of the W&M yearbook and presumably other years.

== Alpha ==
The all-female Alpha or Ladies of Alpha was likely created to counteract the college's male-dominated secret societies. It was created by Martha Barksdale in 1918, a member of the first class of female students at William & Mary. Their stated mission is that they are dedicated to empowering women and recognizing strong female leadership. They recognize female students and faculty monthly for their dedication to the college community by leaving yellow roses and notes for these individuals. Other details surrounding this society remain a mystery.

== Bishop James Madison Society ==
The Bishop James Madison Society reports its founding year as 1812. Named in honor of William & Mary's eighth president, the late Bishop James Madison. The original society disbanded during the Civil War but it was reformed sometime in the 20th century. The society's activities, which seek to further the reputation, pride, and mirth of the college community, include the promotion of a "Last Lecture" in which it invites a noted faculty member to speak on issues of current social and/or academic importance. Membership in the society is confidential. During the college's annual commencement exercises, some graduating members identify their involvement by wearing medals featuring the society's symbol, an elongated quatrefoil.

== The Cord ==
The Cord is believed to have been founded in 1881 after the College was forced to close as a result of financial issues dating back to the Civil War, and would not reopen until 1888. President Ewell continued to ring the College Bell at the beginning of each academic year for the duration of the College's closure. The name "The Cord" is thought to have been taken from the cord that rings the College Bell as a symbol of the society's endurance through William & Mary's darkest years. The society is said to consist of eight members, four seniors who then select four juniors during each academic year to replace them and choose the next year's juniors. Little is known about the actions of The Cord, but they appear to take part in several ceremonies and rituals around campus each year, set up by the seniors but attended only by its juniors.

== Live Oak Society ==
The Live Oak Society is associated the quote "There is no limit to the good you can do if you don’t care who gets the credit” by George C. Marshall.

== P.D.A. ==
P.D.A. was the second fraternity after FHC to be established at William & Mary. Created in 1773. P.D.A. as a secret Latin name, was composed of seven individuals. It continued in operation until 1976.

== Phi Society ==
The Phi Society was created at the University of Virginia, but a chapter has been established at William & Mary. Little is known about this society at the college. Another similarly named organization, the Phi Society of 1883 exists at The University of the South. Outside of the fact that both organizations were created by former members of Phi Delta Theta, the two societies are unrelated. Both societies branched off from the main organization due to conflicts of interest with the national organization.

== W Society ==
Little is known about the W Society. It honors one freshman every year for service to the Williamsburg community. The members are selected via secret invitation. The Society is service-focused and was founded by two students and Drew Stelljes, a former administrator and professor.

== Wren Society ==
Logo of the Wren Society

The Wren Society was founded by John Hadley on October 20, 1832, at the College of William & Mary to honor the two hundredth birthday of Sir Christopher Wren. Christopher Wren is the presumed designer of the Wren Building, which is the nation's oldest academic building. It quickly grew in prominence. Like the Bishop James Madison Society, the Wren Society went inactive during the American Civil War. The Wren Society was reactivated by student in the 20th century and has continued to assist the college. Annually, it recognizes campus involvement and academic achievement by presenting the 1832 Award to eight seniors, three professors, two staff members, and a student organization.

The Wren Society invites or 'taps' members based on their academics, service, and leadership within the college community. Membership in the Wren Society is confidential but is rumored to consist of a select number of upperclassmen leaders from all walks of campus life.

The society is thought to meet late at night on campus in the Wren Building. Its motto is "Veritas e Aequitas" or "Trust from Equity", and is featured on its crest, along with the founding date of 1832.

It should not be confused with the Christopher Wren Association which is now called the Osher Lifelong Learning Institute in Williamsburg, Virginia.

== Zodiac Society ==
The Zodiac Society first revealed itself to the William & Mary campus by leaving a good luck note to students in Swem Library before the December 2013 final exams.

== See also ==
- Collegiate secret societies in North America
