= Cadaver Society =

Washington and Lee University group

- Founded: 1957; 68 years ago Washington and Lee University
- Type: Secret
- Affiliation: Independent
- Status: Active
- Emphasis: Pre-med
- Scope: Local
- Chapters: 1
- Headquarters: Lexington, Virginia; United States

The Cadaver Society is a secret society for male students at Washington and Lee University in Lexington, Virginia, United States. It was founded in 1957.

== History ==
The Cadaver Society has been in continuous operation since its founding in 1957. The society refers to itself as "A Friend of the University". It is known for nocturnal pranks.

The membership of the Cadaver Society is strictly anonymous. Membership is speculated to consist of older students, pre-med students, or leaders of Washington and Lee's athletic teams and fraternities.

== Symbols and traditions ==
The Cadavers symbol is a skull with the letter C around it. It can be found in many prominent places throughout the campus. One place in particular where the Cadavers' logo can be consistently seen is on Wilson Field; they painted it at the endzone every Friday before a game when the field was grass. Since the renovation of the field in 2008, and the replacement of grass with Field Turf, the Cadaver symbol in permanently on the hill separating Alumni from Wilson Field.

The society's members wear a skull mask and all black for anonymity while on campus excursions. It has long been rumored to have underground passageways spanning the campus and surfacing in the campus library.

== Scholarship and endowment ==
A Cadaver Society Scholarship was established in 1997. The scholarship is to be awarded every four years to an incoming freshman. The Cadaver Endowment was committed in 1981 to be designated as a residual fund in Cadaver's name to the school each year.

== See also ==
- Collegiate secret societies in North America
