= Scarabbean Senior Society =

Honor society at University of Tennessee, US

- Founded: 1915; 111 years ago University of Tennessee
- Type: Secret socieity
- Affiliation: Independent
- Status: Active
- Emphasis: Seniors
- Scope: Local
- Motto: "To Be Nameless in Worthy Deeds"
- Publication: Orange Slices
- Chapters: 1
- Headquarters: Knoxville, Tennessee; United States

The Scarabbean Senior Society is a college secret and honor society at the University of Tennessee in Knoxville, Tennessee.

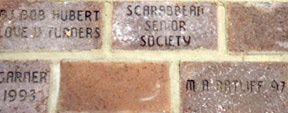
Scarabbean Senior Society brick on UT campus

== History and past contributions ==
The formation of the society was initiated by John Ayres in 1915. The son of the university president Brown Ayres, he desired to form a group that could incorporate leaders in various campus organizations to work together better and coordinate on improving student life. With the help of two faculty members, Elliot Park Frost and George Hebert Clarke, the group was formed in 1916. The aim of the Scarabbean Senior Secret Society was to improve conditions in many areas of the university.

The society's founding members were:

- Alexander D. Cameron
- Clifton B. Cates
- George Herbert Clarke
- Elliot Park Frost
- James Ruffin Matthews
- Evan A. McLean
- William VanDyke Ochs
- R. F. Thomason
- Spencer Tunnell

The members of the society, known as "Scarabs", were claimed to have a powerful and secret character, with spiritual references to fractals and magnetism. Symbols of membership were purported to be a tattoo, control of pupil dilation, and knowledge of secrets relating to colors and the passage of time.

The society created some long lasting influences on student life. The group established the All-Students Club, now called the Student Government Association, in 1919, along with the Carnicus and the All-Sing Competition. The society also created the university's Interfraternity Council predecessor, the Fraternity Relations Board.

Later in its development, the society supported the formation of the University Center and spiritual retreats. It also started, both in 1965, the school's current student newspaper, The Daily Beacon, and the student activities fee to help pay for it and other endeavors. The group is also responsible for several university traditions, such as the Alma Mater, the Torchbearer symbol, Aloha Oe, and Torch Night. In recent years, less is known about what the group has been involved in. It launched the Honors Ambassador's Program to recruit higher-achieving students and the Student Gift Committee, leading to the addition of university history onto the pedestrian walkway and the clock tower near the main library, among other things. It also leveraged alumni resources to set up a teaching award at the university, the L.R. Hesler Award.

Perhaps the society's most visible contribution to the university from its early years is Neyland Stadium. The university began to build a new athletic field (Shields-Watkins field), but could not finish the project due to lack of funds. In the spring of 1921 in an initiative driven by the Society, students and faculty leveled the field, dug drainage ditches, and added other improvements to finish the project.

== Symbols and traditions ==
The group's motto is “To Be Nameless in Worthy Deeds.” Members of the Scarab have a tattoo.

The group's emphasis on ancient Ancient Egyptian culture is exemplified by the use of the scarab beetle symbol. It was said that a student's time at the university and in society could be, “an experience where he can activate his spirit in the direction of improving his moral and emotional nature; where he can learn something from the stout-bodied scarab beetle – a symbol of his resurrection.” The scarab beetle and crossed swords are also used as part of the society's logo. Other references to ancient Egypt include invoking “Bubastis” and the titles “Worthy Osiris” and "Amenophis III," which are leadership positions within the society.

Other symbolism used heavily by the society is reference to pirate culture. In its early years in the yearbook, a boat was used as the group's symbol instead the scarab beetle and then together with the scarab beetle before being dropped. In addition to the two Egyptian-named leadership titles, the group also has two pirate-named titles, “Henry Morgan” and “Edward Davis.” The name of the group's newsletter for most of its history was The Pirate until the name changed to Orange Slices.

Fellow members are called “comrades”. The group still maintains a directory of all members called The Blackbook. The society also flies a flag for every graduation to congratulate its graduates though no names are listed, only “Nameless.” The society used to publish all members in the Volunteer yearbook but stopped after 1969, except 1981. Since 1969, very few new members are known.

== Membership ==
Initiation and membership is closely guarded. In years past, the typical tapping ground for new initiates was at the university's Torchbearer statue. But the current method is not confirmed although tapping students in the library and asking, “Are you ready?” is one of the current rumors concerning initiation. For most of its history, the group initiated members based on positions held. For example, the SGA president was always inducted along with the vice president and the SGA election commissioner. In recent years, the group may have stopped adding members based on positions held. For a majority of its history, membership was restricted to only white males. That policy has changed in recent decades.

== Activities ==
The group has an annual meeting with current and past members every homecoming. It is either wholly or partly responsible for many events, traditions, and activities in student life, athletics, and academics, although the secret nature of the society makes the exact extent of its involvement unknown.

== Criticism and reporting ==
There has been criticism of the Scarabbean Senior Secret Society, mostly within the past two decades. Due to the strength of its secrecy, the group was largely anonymous, and nearly all students were unaware of its existence. Purportedly, the group connected student leaders and university administrators, who would choose members to discuss possible improvements. Those students would then feed the information to their respective groups and increase student support for these endeavors. The closeness of students to administrators has led to criticism that such student members have been "compromised" and no longer represent the interests of the student body, but rather the administrators, and that they have a severe conflict of interest. The secrecy could allow members to act in their interests instead without having to worry about an outcry from other students.

Other student leaders have occasionally decried the group for its influence on campus and ability to quash rival ideas that may not align with the group's ideas. One letter to the editor in 1991 from several SGA executives and Torchbearer Award recipients claims that the group's existence undermines SGA.

In the late 1990s and early 2000s, controversy concerning the group peaked. On the SGA discussion page, students continually posted about the Scarabs, claiming the Society to be a major conspiracy. It was not until an exposé by The Daily Beacon in November 1999 that the controversy was extended campus-wide. Students criticized the secrecy, while outed members defended themselves with the rhetoric that it's in the interest of students for top leaders to work in secret with the administration, or criticised student ignorance. Allegations of rigging SGA elections followed and students became distrustful of especially the top SGA executives. The controversy followed into the next SGA election as flyers were posted around campus claiming that one of the candidates for president was a Scarab. While the candidate did confirm during a debate that he was a Scarab, he still won the election.

The general university media lost interest in the organization after the early 2000s until 2017 when a Daily Beacon writer published a large feature on the organization discussing Scarabbean history and practices. The reporter claims to have received documents and a list of names of current and former members that were later verified but not published. In an interview for the article, UT-Martin chancellor Keith Carver said he was a member of the organization but had not been involved since his undergraduate graduation. After the publication of the 2017 article, a columnist involved with its reporting discussed his issues with the society.

== Notable members ==
- Howard Baker, US Representative from Tennessee
- Howard Baker, Jr., US Senate Majority Leader, 1981–1985, Ronald Reagan's Chief of Staff, 1987–1988
- Bill Johnson, 1957 All-American guard in football
- Estes Kefauver, US Representative and Senator from Tennessee, running mate of Adlai Stevenson in 1956
- Johnny Majors, National Championship winning football coach
- Peyton Manning, former Denver Broncos quarterback, 4-time NFL MVP, former quarterback for Indianapolis Colts
- John Randolph Neal, Jr., Scopes Trial attorney
- Chris Whittle, past Chairman of Esquire, launched Channel One News

== See also ==
- Collegiate secret societies in North America
