= Order of Gimghoul =

Collegiate secret society in North Carolina, US

- Founded: 1889; 137 years ago University of North Carolina at Chapel Hill
- Type: Secret
- Affiliation: Independent
- Status: Active
- Scope: Local
- Chapters: 1
- Headquarters: Gimghoul Road; Chapel Hill, North Carolina; United States; 35°54′43″N 79°02′10″W

The Order of Gimghoul is a collegiate secret society at the University of North Carolina at Chapel Hill. It is headquartered at Hippol (or Gimghoul) Castle in Chapel Hill, North Carolina.

== History ==
The order was founded in 1889 by Robert Worth Bingham, Shepard Bryan, William W. Davies, Edward Wray Martin, and Andrew Henry Patterson, who were University of North Carolina at Chapel Hill (UNC) students at the time.

The society centers itself around the legend of Peter Dromgoole, a student who mysteriously disappeared from campus in 1833. An urban legend evolved surrounding his departure, centering around his love of a Chapel Hill girl known only as "Miss Fanny." Supposedly, Dromgoole attempted to fight a duel to win her hand but was ultimately slain. Retellings of the legend vary from that point, variously stating that Miss Fanny either died of sorrow after visiting his grave every night or held his head in her arms as he passed. In reality, it is believed that Dromgoole left for Europe after failing his entry exams or joining the Army, possibly under the name of his roommate, John Buxton Williams. The legend may have originated, at least partially, from a duel involving Peter's uncle, George C. Dromgoole.

The founders originally called themselves the Order of Dromgoole, but later changed it to the Order of Gimghoul, "in accord with midnight and graves and weirdness". Tradition has it that the order held to the "Dromgoole legend and the ideals of Arthurian knighthood, and chivalry." From all accounts, the order is social and is believed to have no clandestine agenda.

The archives of the Order of Gimghoul are available in Wilson Library at UNC; although, access to records less than fifty years old requires permission of the order.

== Symbols ==
The Gimghoul emblem features a ghoul with a wicked grin, on a column with a triple foundation. The ghoul holds the Mystic Key in his left hand and the Cross of Gimghoul in his right hand. His tail spells the name "Gimghoul". Above the ghoul is a crescent moon and a group of seven stars.

Since 1890, the order has inserted a coded message, written by the Rex, the leader of the order, into most editions of the university's yearbook.

== Gimghoul Castle ==
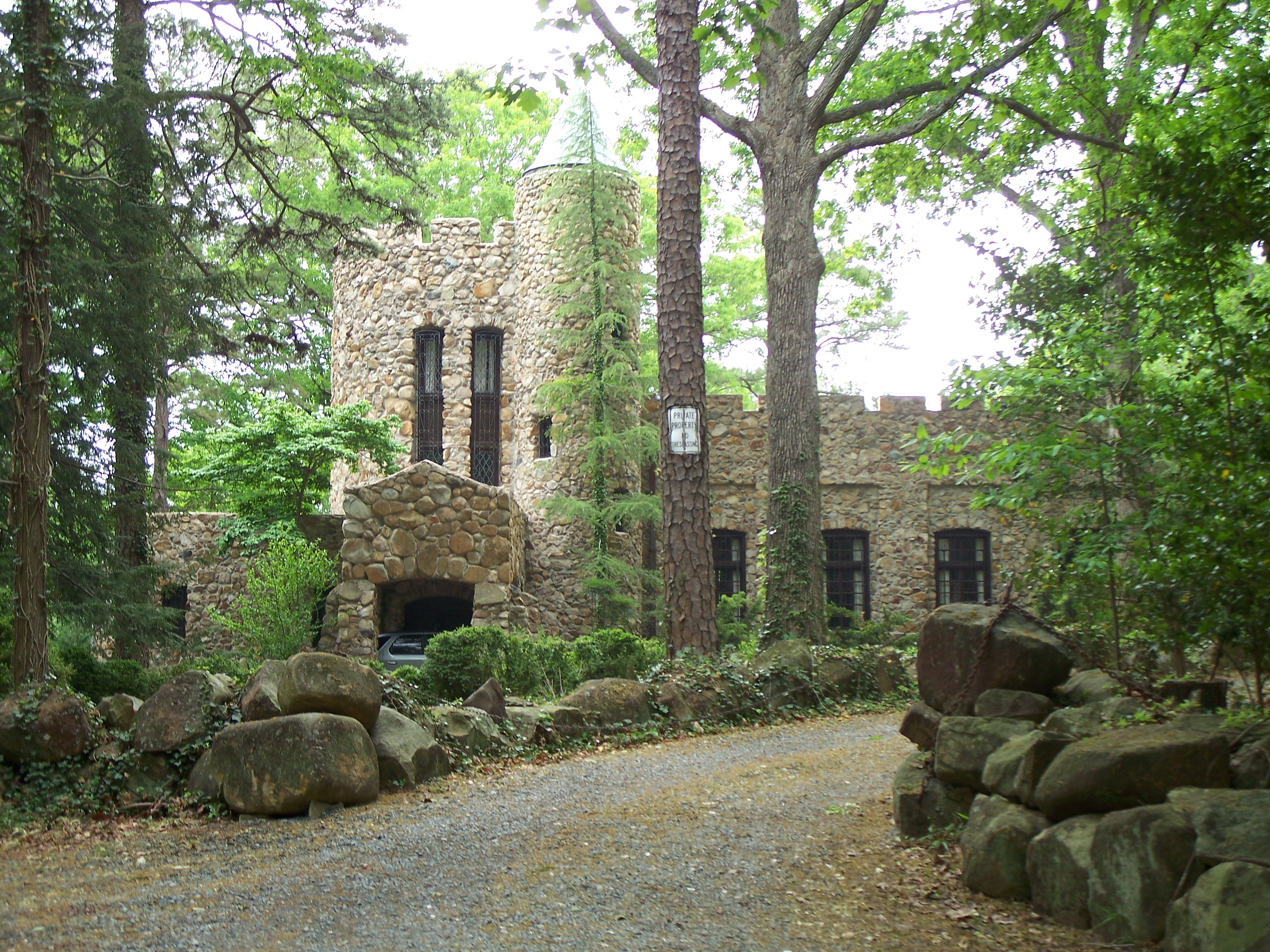
Hippol Castle

The meeting place of the Order of Gimghoul is Hippol Castle, commonly known as Gimghoul Castle. Club founder Edward Wray Martin was noted as the most vocal proponent of the castle: former UNC English Professor Charles Phillips Russell recalled, "Gimghoul Castle, medieval in form and mysterious in air, owes its existence to the romantic fancies of law student Edward Wray Martin of the class of 1891, a devoted reader of Arthurian and other medieval legends, who saw shining knights where others saw grey professors. He perceived blond princesses instead of fat waitresses." Martin dreamed of the club having a "great gloomy pile standing on the edge of a cliff" where it could perform secret activities.

There is some disagreement about exactly how old the castle is, as well as who built it. According to Russell, the castle was finished in 1926—its elaborate stone construction the handiwork of Waldensian stone-masons from Valdese, North Carolina. Others are less definite in their claims, stating the castle took between four and six years to finish and was completed in the 1920s by French artisans. A third variation of the tale states that its construction started in 1924 and took 1,300 tons of rough stone . All sources agree that the cost of construction exceeded $50,000 ($917932 in today's money).

To finance its construction, the Order sold 35 acres (14 ha) of property that was later designated the Gimghoul Neighborhood Historic District. The castle is located off-campus at the end of Gimghoul Road, not far from Old Chapel Hill Cemetery near Carmichael Auditorium. According to real estate records, the 2.15-acre (0.87 ha) site is owned by a non-profit corporation the Order of the Gimghoul and has a taxable value of over $1 million. The castle is a contributing building in the Chapel Hill Historic District.

According to legend, the castle is situated on or near the grave of Peter Dromgoole and his ghost still haunts the grounds. A rock, known as "Dromgoole Rock," is supposedly permanently stained red with his blood after it was used to hide his body; it sits directly in front of the castle.

== Membership ==
The society is open to "notable" male students (rising juniors and higher), and faculty members by invitation.

== Popular culture ==
The Chris Gethard Show, a public access comedy television show in New York, has filmed several "exposés" on the order, none of which have substantiated any of the show's allegations.
