= Herbert Davis (academic administrator) =

British literary scholar and university administrator (1893–1967)

Herbert John Davis

President of Smith College
- In office 1940–1949
- Preceded by: Elizabeth Cutter Morrow
- Succeeded by: Benjamin Fletcher Wright

Personal details
- Born: 24 May 1893; Northamptonshire, England
- Died: 28 March 1967 (aged 73)

Herbert John Davis, FBA (24 May 1893 – 28 March 1967) was an English literary scholar and university administrator.

Davis was educated at St John's College, Oxford, where he read classics, graduating in 1914. After service in the First World War, he was appointed to a lectureship in English at the University of Leeds in 1920. Two years later, he moved to University College, Toronto, to be an associate professor; he was guest professor at the University of Cologne in the 1924–25-year, before returning to Toronto, where he was promoted to a full professorship in 1935.

In 1938, he moved to Cornell University to chair the English department (in 1939, he also became Goldwin Smith Professor there), but left in 1940 to become the fourth official president of Smith College, serving from 1940 to 1949, succeeding acting president Elizabeth Cutter Morrow. During World War II, he presided over the creation of America's first Officers' Training Unit of the Women's Reserve (also known as WAVES). In 1949, he was appointed to a readership in textual criticism at the University of Oxford, where he became a professor in 1956. He retired four years later, having been elected a fellow of the British Academy in 1954.
