= DVS Senior Honor Society =

Collegiate society at Emory University

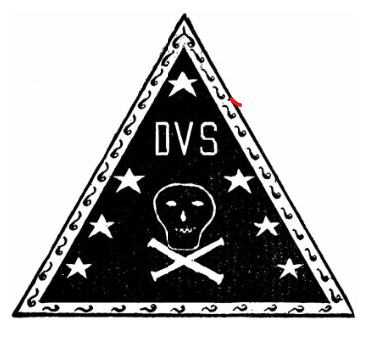
- Founded: 1900; 126 years ago Emory University
- Type: Honor
- Affiliation: Independent
- Status: Active
- Emphasis: Seniors
- Scope: Local
- Chapters: 1
- Members: 7 active 800+ lifetime
- Headquarters: Atlanta, Georgia; United States

The D.V.S. Senior Honor Society is an honor society at Emory University in Atlanta, Georgia. It was founded in 1900 and is the oldest and most exclusive student-selected honor society on campus.

== History ==
D.V.S. Senior Honor Society was founded at Emory University in the spring of 1900 as a male-only organization. Its purpose was "to recognize accomplishments already made, but more importantly, to encourage those who were tapped to continue their loyalty to Emory, to encourage their leadership skills for the betterment of society, and therefore to reflect positively on Emory." It consisted of seven members who were seniors.

In the mid-1970s, D.V.S. disbanded under pressure from an anti-elitism and anti-secret society movement on campus. However, D.V.S. alumni reformed the society in 1977, recruiting seven seniors and seven juniors. These fourteen recruits were all male but D.V.S. became co-ed with its next class of members.

D.V.S. is the oldest and most exclusive of Emory's student-selected honor societies. Its members include Emory presidents, board of trustees chairs, and Rhodes Scholars. As of 2014, the society has inducted nearly 800 members.

== Symbols ==
The meaning of the letters D.V.S. is not revealed publicly. The society's emblem was drawn by founding member Fletcher Gray Rush. In the 1960s, new recruits were introduced to the campus with an upside-down pipe in their mouth. Emory University Library has three D.V.S. pipes in its collection.

== Activities ==
The majority of the society's activities go unrecognized. Annually, it publicly honors an individual who has significantly impacted current students with its D.V.S. Award. It also sponsors the Goodrich C. White Lecture Series, named for a D.V.S. member and former university president.

In 1965, D.V.S. donated the university mace that is carried during convocation and commencement. Its members are the "white-gloved escorts for Dooley, the spirit of Emory" whose is represented on the tip of the mace.

== Membership ==
D.V.S. admits seven seniors each year based on their campus leadership, dedication to Emory, and academic excellence. Its recruitment process is called "tapping". The existing members select their replacement from the junior class before graduating. Membership is kept secret until graduation when the seven graduating members' names are printed in the commencement announcements.

Historically, however, new members were publicly announced during their junior year at commencement. They stood in a V-formation on the steps of Candler Building, with clasped hands and D.V.S. painted on their faces, with an upside-down pipe in the mouth.

== Notable members ==
- George P. Cuttino, professor emeritus of history and Emory's chief marshal from 1976 to 1984
- Goodrich C. White, former president of Emory University

== See also ==
- Collegiate secret societies in North America
- Honor society
