= Dragon Society (Binghamton University) =

Honor society at Binghamton University

- Founded: 1950; 76 years ago Harpur College
- Type: Honor
- Affiliation: Independent
- Status: Defunct
- Defunct date: c. 1975
- Emphasis: Seniors
- Scope: Local
- Symbol: Dragon
- Headquarters: Vestal, New York; United States

The Dragon Society was a historically significant collegiate honor and secret society at Binghamton University, originally known as Harpur College. Founded in 1950, the society recognized upperclassmen for exceptional extracurricular leadership and contributions to campus life. Though inactive since the mid 1970s, it has not been formally dissolved and remains part of the university’s heritage.

== History ==
The Dragon Society was founded in the spring of 1950, the same year Harpur College became part of the State University of New York system. Created by the college's United Student Government, the Dragon Society was an extracurricular honor society. Its members were selected using a point system earned for specific activities.

The Dragon Society inducted its first members in the early 1950s. Initially, membership was awarded to graduating seniors. In March 1951, the United Student Government decided to turn the Dragon Society a senior honor society for current students, who would be eligible for membership at the end of their junior year as a reward for three years of outstanding extracurricular activities. In May 1952, 24 students were “tapped” into the Dragon Society.

The Dragon Society hosted at least one formal banquet annually to honor new and outgoing members. These dinners were attended by college officials and often included speeches celebrating student service. The college's president, Glenn G. Bartle, participated in Dragon Society events and delivered remarks at the society's formal dinner in 1955.

The society maintained a strong presence throughout the 1950s and 1960s, coinciding with the college’s transition to its Vestal, New York campus and its renaming as SUNY Binghamton in 1965. Yearbooks from this period regularly listed inductees, and photographs show members from diverse leadership roles, including student government, publications, and athletics.

By the 1970s, cultural shifts in student activism and skepticism toward exclusivity contributed to the Dragon Society’s declining visibility. While references to the society continued through the early 1970s, by the late 1970s it had largely fallen into inactivity. However, no official record of dissolution exists, and it remains a recognized historical organization in university archives.

== Symbols ==
The society’s central symbol was the dragon. Members received lapel pins in the shape of a dragon or bearing dragon imagery, which were worn at formal events or commencement.

== Membership ==
Membership was extended to upperclassmen, typically juniors and seniors, who demonstrated outstanding leadership and service across campus activities for three years, while maintaining a C GPA. Dragon Society was coeducational from the beginning. It used a structured "honor point system" to quantify student involvement, with points awarded for positions held in student government, publications, athletics, service organizations, and academic clubs. Selection was managed jointly by society leadership and representatives of the Undergraduate Student Government. A faculty advisor helped oversee the process.

== Notable members ==
- Ronald G. Ehrenberg (Class of 1966), labor economist and Cornell University professor

== See also ==
- List of collegiate secret societies
- List of senior societies
