= OBC (secret society) =

Secret society at University of North Carolina Asheville

- Founded: May 1938; 87 years ago University of North Carolina at Asheville
- Type: Secret
- Affiliation: Independent
- Status: Active
- Scope: Local
- Chapters: 1
- Headquarters: Asheville, North Carolina; United States

Society symbol on Seely Castle, circa 1960

OBC is the oldest known collegiate secret society operating at the University of North Carolina at Asheville. Its existence has been documented as early as May 1938.

== History ==
In 1948, Asheville-Biltmore College (now the University of North Carolina at Asheville) moved to Seely Castle on Sunset Mountain. It was during the period of the college's residence at Seely Castle that rumors of a secret society arose. A small group of students whose possessions included artifacts from the American Civil War, referring to themselves as simply OBC, was alleged to use the lowest rooms of the castle to hold secret meetings, beginning a tradition of underground meeting places that is rumored to hold true to today.

The original purpose of the group was believed to have been the creation of a public liberal arts college, as the society has been long associated with projects aimed at the improvement of what has now become the university.

== Symbols ==
The name OBC stands for the Latin Ordo Bos Canis or Order of the Bull Dog. The mascot for the university is the bulldog. The symbol believed to be linked to the society, a large letter B surrounded by a circle with two hash marks at 45 and 135 degrees, appears on buildings and sidewalks in out-of-the-way locations on campus approximately once every semester.

== Activities ==
The purpose of OBC is "to create, promote, enhance and advance school spirit and university traditions." As of 2013, the group is funded annually with $2,000 from the UNC Asheville Foundation.

Historically, the group is suggested to have been responsible for keeping the college afloat during the long years of economic instability following the Depression, and for the construction of bomb shelters beneath many of the academic buildings during the Cold War. They are held to have begun the traditional autumnal ceremony of the Turning of the Maples, now hosted by the Alumni Office.

The society is accredited with a wide range of activities, from major financial donations to minor humorous pranks. The completed construction of the newest building on the University of North Carolina at Asheville campus, Zeis Hall, is reportedly possible only thanks to the donation of a large sum of money from the society.

== Membership ==
Membership in the society has never been revealed and its initiates take a pledge to maintain secrecy. It has been written that members are students "deeply involved in student organizations and other prominent leadership positions in the University, a tactic which is suggested to ease the ability of the society to wield its influence within the University's community."

It has been suggested that the society is in communication with the administration and Board of Trustees of the University of North Carolina at Asheville, as well as the present-day owners of Seely Castle. The society is also alleged to have associations with the North Carolina State government through Representative Taylor, beginning in 1948.
