= Paladin Society =

Secret society at Emory University, US

- Founded: 1998; 27 years ago Emory University
- Type: Secret
- Affiliation: Independent
- Status: Active
- Scope: Local
- Chapters: 1
- Members: 12 active
- Headquarters: Atlanta, Georgia; United States

The Paladin Society is a secret society at Emory University in Atlanta, Georgia, United States.

== History ==
The Paladin Society was established in 1998 at Emory University. It seeks to promote spirit, foster community, and uphold tradition at Emory University through dedication to humble service.

== Membership ==
Each year, the Paladin Society admits an undisclosed number of members but is believed to house a total of twelve current Emory students. The Paladin Society does not recruit its members in the most typical sense; members are watched, tested, and then invited to join the Society based on several criteria – including commitment to the university and its progress, service, and a deep passion for improving quality of life at the school. Members rise from every area of campus involvement.

== Activities ==
The Paladin Society has become known as one of the most active and positive forces on Emory's campus. While most of the society's activities are hidden from or unknown to the public, the Knights of Emory Spirit awards are given to two outstanding seniors or a campus group or organization, each semester. Those selected for this honor have made significant contributions to the university and promote Emory spirit with a passion and selflessness that reflect the values of the society.

The society also hosts The Emory 1836 Dinners, designed to bring together students from different corners of campus with shared interests. Each dinner is focused on a central topic that changes from one to the next; a keynote speaker who is considered to be an expert kicks off the evening and then individual tables engage in discussion, inspiring new ways of thinking and a platform for sharing ideas. Each year, all of the freshman residence halls are invited to attend an 1836 Dinner focused on a topic similar to their hall's theme. These underclassmen events provide the new students an opportunity to connect with upperclassmen and university staff who are engaged in activities, interests, issues or concerns they may share.

== See also ==
- Collegiate secret societies in North America
- Secret society
