= Thurtene Carnival =

American student-run carnival

Coordinates: 38°38′52″N 90°18′44″W

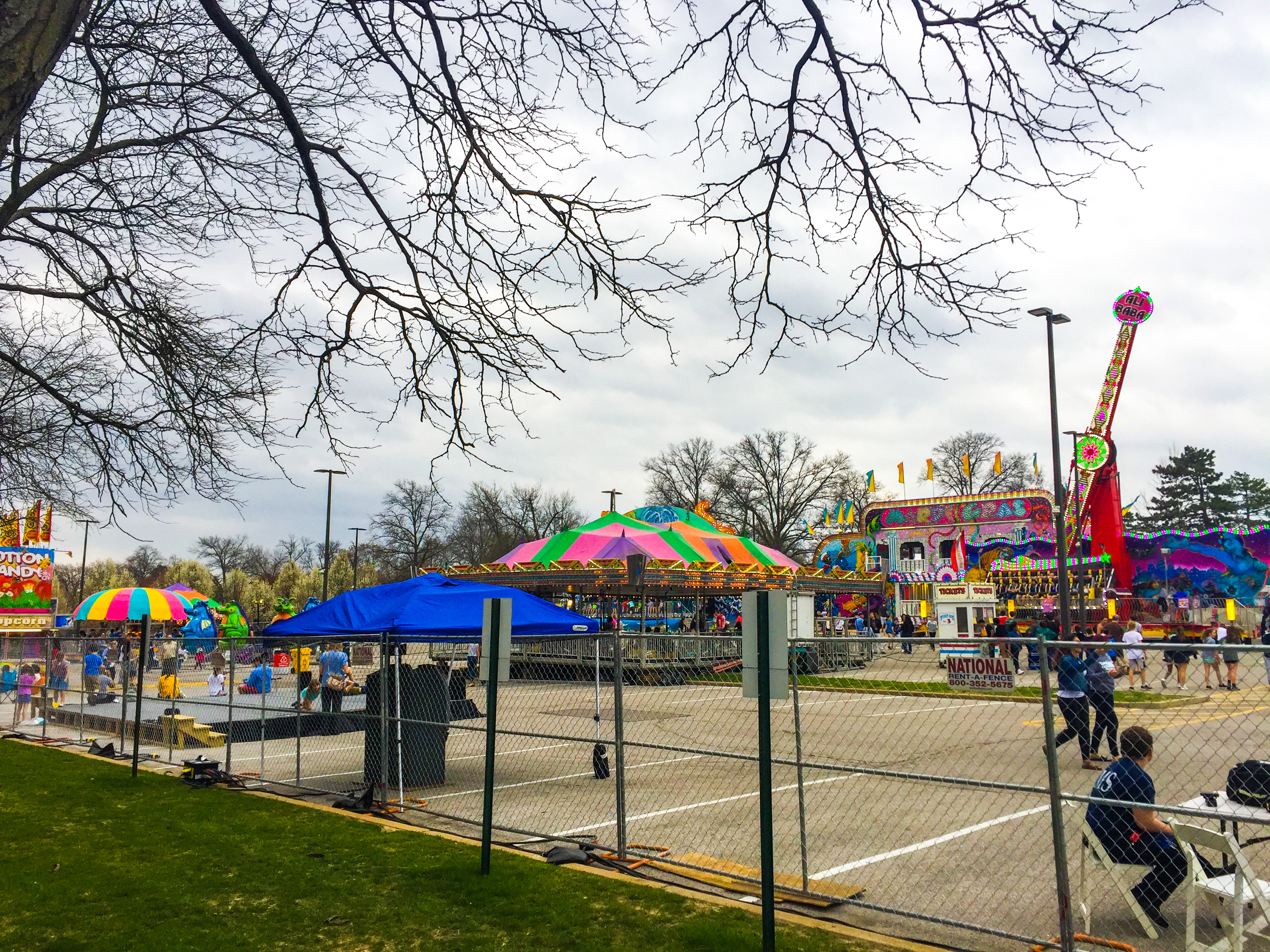
ThurtenE Carnival, Washington University in St. Louis, April 2018

ThurtenE Carnival is the oldest and largest student-run carnival in the United States of America. Founded in 1908, it is held annually in the spring at Washington University in St. Louis and is organized by ThurtenE Honorary, formerly a secret society.

== Honorary committee ==
In an undergraduate's junior year, a student may apply for a position on the Thurtene honorary committee. This commitment lasts for the following two years as the juniors officially plan the event and the seniors oversee and support the juniors in their planning.

The committee is made up of thirteen members. Each is selected to have a specific role, such as connecting with vendors or supervising the work from other WashU student groups. Each member wears a bright yellow jacket with their initials and the honorary symbol on it; these jackets are one of the key ways that other students tell who is part of the honorary.

The net proceeds from this event are donated to a specified, local community partner, chosen by the honorary that year.

== Campus involvement in Thurtene ==
For the months leading up to Thurtene, excitement is drilled on campus for the upcoming event. Pieces of paper with the new members of the honorary posted and chalk designs of the typical Thurtene honorary symbol are all around campus. In addition, many social media channels, such as student's and the university's X, Facebook, Snapchat, and Instagram accounts, display the emotions on campus beforehand.

Besides Thurtene Honorary who plans the event, various philanthropic student organizations build temporary structures, ranging in size. The organizations are generally the social and professional sororities and fraternities on campus, but a few other clubs do partake as well. The majority of structures are facades, or small buildings, that has a certain theme. These themes are generally not used again for at least 5 years. Examples of past facades are: a Mad Science Lab, a Beehive, a Ski Lodge, a River Boat, a Pirate Ship, etc. Each organization with these structure hold theatrical performances, sell food, and/or have an activity for the spectators to participate in.

In the weeks leading up to the weekend event, each student group has time at the "lot" where they build their structures. Each facade or booth is made from scratch and put together using the student's creativity and engineering skills. About one week to one and half weeks before, the students start raising their structures to stand freely with limited supports.

At the end of the carnival, awards are given to these student groups for their structure's design and build. A few of the prizes are: best construction, best production, best food, best game booth, most environmentally friendly, most money raised for charity, and best participation.
