= Samuel McCleary =

Samuel McCleary may refer to:

- Samuel W. McCleary (1889–1951), American businessman and politician from New York
- Samuel F. McCleary (1780–1855), American attorney and government official from Boston
- Samuel F. McCleary Jr. (1822–1901), his son, American lawyer and government official from Boston

== See also ==
- Samuel H. McLeary (1881–1924), aviation pioneer
