= List of senior societies =

Senior societies are a type of collegiate student organization that recruits juniors and seniors. Senior societies are associated with Dartmouth College, the University of Pennsylvania, and Yale University. These societies can be activity-based, identity-based, school-based (departmental or academic field), or traditional. Senior societies may be "landed", owning a building or tomb, or "non-landed".

Baird's Manual of American College Fraternities (1883), notes that Phi Beta Kappa, founded at the College of William & Mary in 1776, was the first senior society. (Note: Phi Beta Kappa is now considered to be an honor society.) At Dartmouth College, senior societies date back to 1783 with the founding of an organization called the Society of Social Friends. Dartmouth currently had fourteen active senior societies. Yale has more than forty active senior societies. The oldest senior society at Yale is Skull and Bones, established in 1831, followed by Scroll and Key in 1841. Other colleges have similar organizations but use different terminology. For example, there are Princeton University eating clubs and Harvard University final clubs.

Senior societies tend to be exclusive, and members pay dues to belong. Members are most often recruited by a process called "tapping". Membership in each senior society tends to be small, averaging around fifteen active members. Some senior societies are also secret societies, where the names of members are kept secret, while others are open and share their membership rolls. Other senior societies are semi-secret, keeping member's names a secret until graduation. Some senior societies also are considered honor societies.

Following is an incomplete list of collegiate senior societies.

Society	Charter date and range	Institution	Type	Ref.
100 Senior Honorary	2005	Emory University		
Abaris	1996	Dartmouth College	Traditional	
Agaia		Yale University		
Agora		Yale University		
Andromeda	2012	Dartmouth College	Traditional	
The Apostles		Yale University		
Ananias Society	1892–1907	Johns Hopkins University	Traditional, secret	
Atlas	2013	Dartmouth College	Traditional	
Aurelian Honor Society	1910	Yale University	Traditional, secret	
B&C		Yale University		
BaR		Yale University		
Bell Senior Society	2014	University of Pennsylvania	Activity-based	
Belmonte	2013	Yale University		
Berzelius (secret society)	1848	Yale University	Traditional, secret	
Beta Omega	1841–xxxx ?	Kenyon College	Traditional	
Book and Snake	1863	Yale University	Traditional, secret	
Cloak & Dagger	2008	Yale University		
Cage and Feather		Yale University		
Calliopean Society	1819–1853, 1950	Yale University	Traditional, debating	
Cane Club	1921– xxxx ?	Johns Hopkins University	Traditional	
Cap and Skull	1900	Rutgers University	Traditional	
Carriage Senior Society	2013	University of Pennsylvania	Identity-based	
Casque and Gauntlet	1887	Dartmouth College	Traditional	
Ceres Athena		Yale University		(Note: Created when women were first admitted to Yale University.)
C.C.C.	1876–xxxx ?	University of California, Berkeley		
Chimera Society	1914	Dartmouth College	Traditional, secret	
Cipactli Latinx Honor Society	2001	University of Pennsylvania	Identity-based	
Clio	2020	Dartmouth College	Traditional	
Cobra	1978	Dartmouth College	Traditional	
Cong		Yale University		
Cup and Crown		Yale University		
Delta Kappa Delta (local)	18xx ?–xxxx ?	Marietta College	Traditional	
Der Hexenkreis	1892	Cornell University	Traditional	
Deru	1896	Northwestern University	Activity-based	
Desmos	1950–1967, 2010	Yale University	Traditional, secret	(Note: Reformed from Key and Stone (local).)
Double Cuffs	2010	Yale University		
Dragon Society	1898	Dartmouth College	Traditional, secret	
DSG	1989	Yale University	Traditional, secret	(Note: Rumpus reported that DSG stands for "Drunk Senior Girls" but this is disputed by the organization's members.)
DVS Senior Honor Society	1902	Emory University	Activity-based	
Elephant and Coffin	18xx ?–xxxx ?	City College of New York	Traditional	
Elihu Club	1903	Yale University	Traditional	
Fire and Skoal	1975	Dartmouth College	Traditional	
Fork & Knife		Yale University		
Friars Senior Society	1899	University of Pennsylvania	Traditional	
Griffin	1995	Dartmouth College	Traditional	
Gryphon		Yale University		
Gryphon Senior Society	2020	University of Pennsylvania	School-based	
Helios Society	2015	Yale University		
Hexagon	1910	University of Pennsylvania	School-based	
Ink and Needle		Yale University		
Innominatum		Yale University		
Iris		Yale University		
Iron Key		Purdue University	Activity based, secret	
ISO		Yale University		
Kinoki Senior Society	2014	University of Pennsylvania	Activity-based	
Lantern Society	1993	University of Pennsylvania	School-based	
LC		Yale University		
Leviathan		Yale University		
Lincoln		Yale University		
Linonian Society	1753–xxxx ?, 19xx ?	Yale University	Traditional, secret	(Note: Originally formed as a literary society, Linonia was revived as a secret senior society in the 20th century.)
Lion's Paw Senior Society	1908	Pennsylvania State University	Activity-based	
Looking Glass		Yale University		
LSV Society	1907	University of Missouri		
Mace and Chain	1956	Yale University	Traditional, secret	
Manuscript Society	1951	Yale University	Traditional	
Ministry	1999	Dartmouth College		
Myth and Sword	1875–1965, 199x ?	Yale University	Traditional, secret	
Nacoms	1898	Columbia University	Activity-based	
Nathan Hale	1947	Yale University	Traditional, secret	
Nightingales	2011	University of Pennsylvania	School-based	
Octa	2008	Yale University		
Olympus	2014	Dartmouth College	Traditional	
Onyx Senior Society	1974	University of Pennsylvania	Identity-based	
Oracle Senior Society	2003	University of Pennsylvania	Identity-based	
Order of the Sirens	1983	Dartmouth College	Traditional	
Osiris	2016	Dartmouth College	Traditional	
Osiris Senior Society	2013	University of Pennsylvania	Activity-based	
Osiris Society	1903	Massachusetts Institute of Technology	Traditional	
Owl and Key	1909	University of Utah	Traditional	
Owl and Serpent	18xx ?–xxxx ?	Wesleyan University	Traditional	
Owl and Wand	1868–1960s	Wesleyan University	Traditional	
OX	1980	Yale University	Traditional	
Palaeopitus Senior Society	1899	Dartmouth College	Activity-based	
Pew		Yale University		
Phi Chi	18xx ?–xxxx ?	Bowdoin College	Traditional	
Phoenix	1984	Dartmouth College	Traditional	
The Pithotomy Club	1893–1992	Johns Hopkins University	School-based	
Phrygian	2005	Dartmouth College	Traditional, secret	
Praetorian		Yale University		
Prince		Yale University		
The Pundits	1884	Yale University	Activity-based	
Pyxis	2014	Dartmouth College	Traditional	
Quaternion Club	1903–2023	Furman University	Traditional, men	
Quaternion Senior Order	2023	Furman University	Traditional, coed	
Quill and Dagger	1883	Cornell University	Traditional	
Raven	2024	Dartmouth College		
Red Dragon Society	1898	New York University	Traditional, secret	
Red Mask		Yale University		
Ring and Candle	xxxx ?–c. 1975, 2015	Yale University		
Sachems	1915	Columbia University	Activity-based, secret	
Sage and Chalice		Yale University	Traditional, secret	
St. Elmo Society	1963	Yale University	Traditional, secret	
Scarabbean Senior Society	1915	University of Tennessee	Activity-based, secret	
Scroll and Key	1842	Yale University	Traditional, secret	
Senior Order	1937-2023	Furman University	Traditional, women	
The Senior Society	1892	Johns Hopkins University	Traditional	
Shamash Senior Society	2018	University of Pennsylvania	Identity-based	
Sigma Society	1880	Washington and Lee University	Traditional, secret	
Skull and Bones	1832	Yale University	Traditional, secret	
Skull & Keys	1882–c. 1980	University of California, Berkeley	Traditional, secret	
Society of Fox and Chariot	2015	Yale University		
Spade and Grave	1864	Yale University	Traditional, secret	
Sphinx	1886	Dartmouth College	Traditional, secret	
Sphinx Head	1890	Cornell University	Activity-based	
Sphinx Senior Society	1900	University of Pennsylvania	Traditional	
Society of Saint Thomas Aquinas (aka Aquinas)	2010	Yale University	Traditional	
Society of Social Friends	1783–xxxx?	Dartmouth College	Traditional	
TDC	1971	Yale University	Secret, Traditional	
Tejas Club	1925	University of Texas at Austin		
The Order of the Basilisk	1903–1988, 2014	Yale University	Secret, traditional	
Torch Honor Society	1916–196x ?, 1995	Yale University	Traditional	
Trident and Shell	18xx ?–xxxx ?	University of Michigan	Traditional	
Tyger	1892	Dartmouth College	Traditional, secret	
Vulcan Senior Engineering Society	1904	University of Michigan	School-based	
Whiskey and Coke		Yale University		
WIPS (Women in Power Society)		Yale University	Identity-based	
Wolf's Head Society	1883	Yale University	Traditional	
XV		Yale University		

== See also ==
- Collegiate secret societies in North America
- Dartmouth College student groups
- Harvard College social clubs
- Honor society
- Princeton University eating clubs
- University of Pennsylvania senior societies
