= University of Pennsylvania senior societies =

Senior societies are an important part of student life at the University of Pennsylvania (Penn). These societies can be categorized as activity-based, identity-based, school-based, or traditional. Most of these societies are independent organizations that are unique to Penn, although a few have national affiliations. Senior societies recruit juniors and seniors who are outstanding student leaders.

Penn's traditional societies include the first senior societies to be created at the university: Philomathean Society, Friars Senior Society, Sphinx Senior Society, and Mortar Board. The oldest school-based society is Hexagon Senior Society, founded in 1910 at the School of Engineering. The oldest identity-based society at the university is The Onyx Senior Society, founded in 1974 for African American students. Groups such as Carriage Senior Society, Cipactli Latino Honor Society, Oracle Senior Honor Society, and Shamash Senior Society were all formed after 2000 to support an LGBTQ+, Latino, Asian, or Jewish focus. Penn's activity-based societies connect students with common academic or career interests; however, the Order of Omega and the Order Senior Society recognize leadership in campus fraternities and sororities.

Penn's senior societies differ from the campus's Greek letter fraternities and sororities by having a more diverse membership and a less formal recruitment process. Members are recruited through a process known as tapping. Most societies recruit or tap up to thirty members a year, thus limiting the size of the society. In addition to on-campus interactions with other members, the student societies connect students to the group's alumni.

== Activity-based ==
=== Bell Senior Society ===
The Bell Senior Society was founded in 2014. The organization brings together students involved with innovation and technology around Penn's campus. New members are selected by the previous class based on potential and passion for technology and entrepreneurship.

=== Kinoki Senior Society ===
Kinoki Senior Society was founded in the spring of 2014. This organization brings together students who plan on pursuing careers in the film and entertainment industry. It has thirty student members, both film and non-film majors.

=== Order of Omega ===
The Zeta Xi chapter of the Order of Omega was established on May 21, 1985, and rechartered at Penn in 2014. It is a chapter of a national organization that recognizes leaders of fraternities and sororities. Omega is composed of juniors and seniors who best represent the positive aspects of Greek life: character, scholarship, service, and leadership.

=== Osiris Senior Society ===
Osiris was founded in 2013 to bring together senior leaders and outstanding members of the performing arts community. It includes theater, dance, tech, and vocal and instrumental music. The society draws its name from the god Osiris, who was believed by some in ancient Greco-Egyptian times to have been the god who brought together the nine muses. Similarly, the society provides a forum for students of different art forms, including vocal, dance, theatrical, instrumental, photographic, and tech, among others, to strengthen ties across the performing arts community. Throughout the year, members attend social events and support each other at shows, and each May, members perform a senior showcase highlighting the talents of these students and fostering collaborative performance.

== Identity-based ==
=== Carriage Senior Society ===
The Carriage Senior Society, founded in the spring of 2013, is a senior honor society of leaders from around campus who are members of the LGBTQ+ community. It is named for the home of the university's LGBT Center, Carriage House. Their symbol is a twelve-spoked carriage wheel and members refer to themselves as "Spokes."

New members are added both as juniors in their spring semester and as seniors in their fall semester. Active membership at any given time is limited to 25 students. While members continue the traditional tap system for potential applicants, in recent years, an open invitation to the informational "Smoker" has been distributed to LGBTQ groups on campus; any eligible student who attends the Smoker is then welcome to apply, whether or not they have been tapped.

=== Cipactli Latinx Honor Society ===
The Cipactli Latinx Honor Society was founded in 2001. The mission and purpose of Cipactli is to acknowledge individual academic achievement, leadership, and distinguished service to the Latino community. The members of Cipactli are chosen anytime between their junior fall semester and senior fall semester for outstanding academics and a commitment to helping their communities develop in a sustainable and meaningful way. The three pillars of Cipactli are Leadership, Academic Achievement, and Community Service.

=== Onyx Senior Society ===
The Onyx Senior Society was founded in 1974 to recognize the academic success, leadership, and community service of African American students. Onyx re-established the university's Society for African-American Students and covered the cost for a pre-freshmen program for Black students. Onyx does not recruit its members through tapping; instead, any Black student on campus can apply for membership.

=== Oracle Senior Society ===
The Oracle Senior Society was founded in 2003. It recognizes outstanding members of each senior class who demonstrate passion, leadership, commitment, and achievement as a student of Asian Pacific heritage or for the Asian Pacific community at the University of Pennsylvania.

As a self-perpetuating senior society, juniors have the opportunity to apply for the society in the spring, and seniors have the opportunity to apply in the fall. Potential members, all of whom have served the university in some leadership capacity, learn more about the society and meet the current members at an informal smoker. Each prospective member must then submit a written application detailing their qualifications. The current senior class selects the new class of Oracle members, representative of the diverse student population, by selecting from the applicant pool based on their fit to Oracle's purpose of demonstrating passion, leadership, commitment, and achievement.

=== Shamash Senior Society ===
Shamash Senior Society was founded in April 2018 to honor Penn's Jewish students. The name of the society comes from the Hebrew word for "servant" or "attendant". The group aims to bring together leaders of the Jewish community and as well as who have a connection to Judaism. Shamash is composed of members of the graduating class of seniors. Interested students can apply for membership at the end of their junior year or in the fall of their senior year.

== School-based ==
=== Hexagon ===
Founded in 1910, Hexagon is the oldest school-based senior honor society at the University of Pennsylvania. The society promotes fraternization across different engineering majors and recognizes outstanding leaders in the School of Engineering and Applied Sciences. Members often lead tours of the Engineering School buildings. Hexagon members are selected based on outstanding achievements in scholarship, leadership, and service.

=== Gryphon Senior Society ===
The Gryphon Senior Society was founded in 2020. It is a society dedicated to recognizing outstanding student leaders in the College of Arts and Sciences.

=== Lantern Society ===
The Lantern Society was formed in 1993 for students at the Wharton School.

=== Nightingales ===
The Nightingales is a Penn senior society that was founded in 2011. It recognizes seniors at the School of Nursing.

== Traditional societies ==
These were the first senior societies to be created at the University of Pennsylvania. The three traditional societies are Friars, Sphinx, and Mortarboard. Friars and Sphinx explicitly seek campus leaders, while Mortarboard seeks to recognize "achievements in scholarship, leadership, and service." Friars and Sphinx are exclusive to the University of Pennsylvania, whereas Mortarboard is a national honor society.

=== Friars Senior Society ===
Founded in 1899, Friars Senior Society is one of the oldest undergraduate senior honor societies at the University of Pennsylvania. It has over 2,100 alumni in the United States and 23 countries throughout the world. (Note: "Founded in 1899, Friars is the older of the two and has twenty members, while the Sphinx, which got underway in 1900, has the largest membership with twenty-five.") Friars was formed to establish uncompromising democracy in university activities Each class is composed of one-third athletic captains, one-third performing arts leaders, and one-third student government, Greek, publications, and community service leaders. Friars promotes interaction between those from all walks of life who have given their time and energies to making the university what it is; hence the name Friars, for those who sacrifice their time during college for meaningful activities. The society was all-male until 1971.

=== Mortar Board ===
Penn's Mortar Board is a chapter of the national Mortar Board honor society. It was the first and only senior society open to women until 1971 when Sphinx and Friars became co-ed. (Note: Mortar Board was a "national honorary organization for women students. The Penn chapter [had] nine members chosen each Hey Day by the graduating seniors in the well-known Tapping Service. These students represented nearly all activities open to women at Penn, such as work on the Dolphin yearbook, the Pennsylvania News, class offices, and various dramatic organizations.") Mortar Board recognizes juniors and seniors for their achievement.

=== Philomathean Society ===
Penn's oldest society, The Philomathean Society, was founded in 1813 and is one of the United States' oldest collegiate literary societies. It continues to host lectures and intellectual events open to the public.

=== Sphinx Senior Society ===
The Sphinx Senior Society, founded in 1900 is the less exclusive of the two oldest senior societies (with the other being Friars Senior Society) at the University of Pennsylvania. (Note: The university's oldest digitized alumni catalog, as well as membership books in the University Archives, has shown the first graduating class of Sphinx Senior Society and of Friars Senior Society to be 1900 and 1901 respectively. The first mention of a senior society at the university can also be found in the 1900 edition of The Record, the yearbook of the College. Though not mentioning Sphinx directly, the members notated as a senior society members were the members of the founding class of Sphinx. Due to previously lost records and the past competitive nature between the groups, the title of second oldest senior society at the university has been debated by members from both organizations and has even led to inaccurate references.) It recognizes the top seniors who have made significant contributions to the university as leaders of the campus. Continuing in this tradition, the society has come to represent all facets of university life and has reflected the changing face of Penn's student body. Members today include leaders in student government, performing arts, media, service groups, cultural organizations, Greek life, athletics, and other realms of student affairs. Sphinx was the first senior society at Penn to admit African-Americans, doing so in 1952. In February 1971, it was the first senior society at Penn to become co-ed.

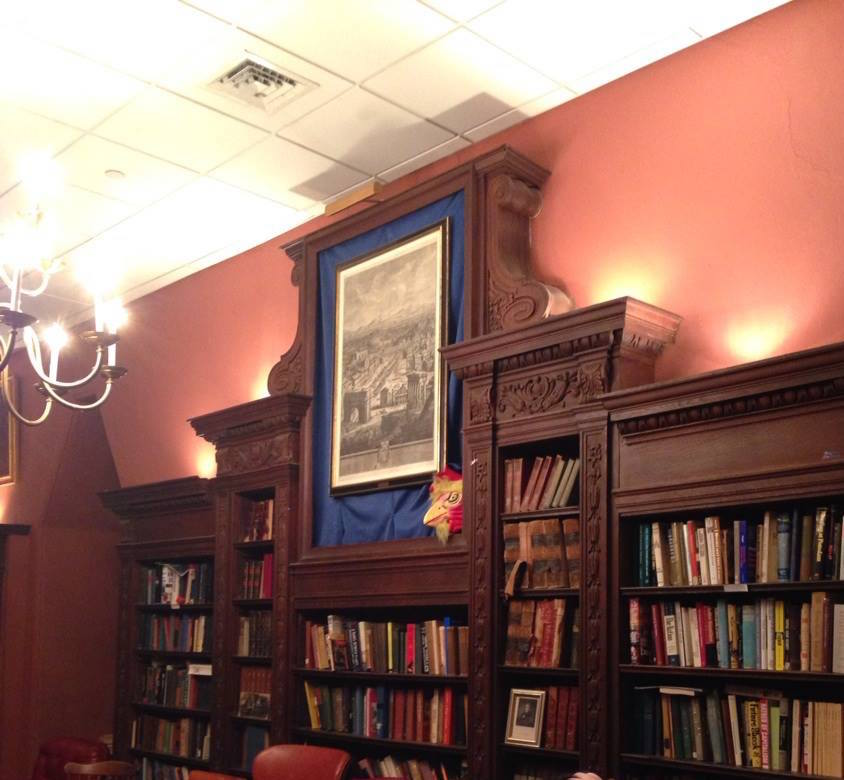
Library of the Philomathean Society

=== Zelosophic Society ===
The Zelosophic Society was founded in 1829 as an alternative to its rival literary society, Philomathean Society (which was established in 1813). “Zelosophic” is translated roughly as “endowed with a zeal for learning or wisdom” and its members were commonly called “Zelos”. The society's purpose was to discuss literature and, like the Philomathean, to conduct debates. The Zelosophic Society's first two iterations lasted from 1829 to 1864 and again from 1892 to 1941.

== See also ==
- Collegiate secret societies in North America
- Harvard College social clubs
- List of senior societies
- Student life at the University of Pennsylvania
