= Skoal =

Skoal may refer to:

- skoal! or skål!, a Scandinavian phrase used as a toast.
- Skoal (tobacco), a smokeless tobacco brand made by U.S. Smokeless Tobacco Company

== See also ==
- Fire and Skoal, senior society at Dartmouth College
- Skol (disambiguation)
- Skal (disambiguation)
- Skoll (disambiguation)
