= Dartmouth College student groups =

This article contains detailed information on a number of student groups at Dartmouth College. For more information on athletic teams, please see Dartmouth College athletic teams.

== Dance ==
Campus dance clubs and ensembles include the Argentine Tango Society, Ballet Folklorico de Dartmouth, Ceili Irish Dancers, Chinese Dance Troupe, For Your Glory Praise Dance Team, FUSION Dance Ensemble, Native Women’s Dancing Society, SHEBA hip hop dance, Staccato, Street Soul, the hip hop Ujima Dance Troupe, and Vandana South Asian dance ensemble.

== Debate ==
=== Dartmouth Forensic Union ===
The Dartmouth Forensic Union (DFU) is the policy debate team of Dartmouth College. The DFU has had at least one first-round qualifier to the National Debate Tournament (NDT) for 25 years running, and has won the NDT eight times.

== Drama and performance ==
=== Casual Thursday ===
Casual Thursday is an improv comedy troupe that performs at Dartmouth. Casual Thursday usually focuses on shortform games in their shows. The group was recognized by the college in 2004.

=== Dartmouth Laboratory Theatre ===
The Dartmouth Laboratory Theatre performed in Robinson Hall and attracted much student involvement starting in the 1910s.

=== Dartmouth Rude Mechanicals ===
The Dartmouth Rude Mechanicals is a student-run Shakespeare company. Founded in the fall of 2008, it is the college's oldest student-run theater troupe.

=== Displaced Theatre Company ===
The Displaced Theatre Company is a contemporary theatre organization that is run by students.

=== Dog Day Players ===
The Dog Day Players improv comedy group was founded in 1995. Dog Day's shows tend to be in longform style. Prominent Dog Days alumni include Mindy Kaling (2001), Phil Lord and Christoher Miller (1997), and Alexi Pappas (2012).

=== The Harlequins ===
The Harlequins is the only student-run musical production organization at Dartmouth College. It was founded in 1995 and produces musicals. As of 2004, the group consists of over 300 student singers, instrumentalists, production staff members, and officers, and hopes to put on additional shows at Dartmouth each term in the coming year.

=== Sit-Down Tragedy ===
Sit-Down Tragedy is a student stand-up comedy group. It was founded in the fall of 2007 as the Dartmouth Stand-Up Comedy Group and changed its name in 2009. Its members write their material ahead of performances.

=== Soul Scribes ===
Founded in 2004, the Soul Scribes is the only group at Dartmouth dedicated exclusively to performance poetry. The Scribes have made multiple appearances at the national College Unions Poetry Slam Invitational and were the 2012 champions of the Wade Lewis Poetry Slam Invitational (the nation's second largest collegiate slam). The group has opened for several world-renowned slam poets, including Roger Bonair-Agard, Derrick C. Brown, Andrea Gibson, Sarah Kay (poet), Phil Kaye, Taylor Mali, Anis Mojgani, Shihan, and Buddy Wakefield.

== Fraternities and sororities ==
Dartmouth College is host to many fraternities and sororities, and a significant percentage of the undergraduate student body is active in Greek life. In 2005, the school stated that 1,785 students were members of a fraternity, sorority, or coeducational Greek house, about 60 percent of the eligible student body. Dartmouth College was among the first institutions of higher education to desegregate fraternity houses in the 1950s, and was involved in the movement to create coeducational Greek houses in the 1970s. In the early 2000s, campus-wide debate focused on whether the Greek system at Dartmouth would become "substantially coeducational", but most houses retain single-sex membership policies. Currently, Dartmouth College extends official recognition to fifteen all-male fraternities, eight all-female sororities, and three coeducational Greek houses.

== Governance ==
=== Collis Governing Board ===
The Collis Governing Board was created in 1980 at the inception of the Collis Center to give students a voice in the management of their student union. It is actively involved in student programming and capital movements to the Collis building.

=== Dartmouth Student Government ===
Dartmouth Student Government (DSG) is the official elected Student Government for all Dartmouth undergraduate students that represents student concerns to the administration and outside community groups, whether that’s around mental health, dining and food insecurity, elections, or infrastructure and housing. Any issue affecting the quality of undergraduate life or education falls within the jurisdiction of DSG. To this end, DSG lends a voice to student concerns and opinions; plays an active role in shaping College policy; protects student rights and freedoms; promotes and finances undergraduate activities; fosters school unity and pride; and serves as a forum for the discussion and advancement of ideas. Each year, twenty-four student Senators are elected to serve across the four undergraduate class years, in addition to the Student Body President and Vice President.

== Music ==
=== Dartmouth Brass Society ===
Founded in 2001, the Dartmouth Brass Society is a student-run organization with a membership of over twenty brass instrumentalists. It has several component groups, including brass quintets and trombone quartets. Certain groups receive professional coaching in conjunction with the Music Department's for-credit chamber music program.

The DBS has played original compositions by Dartmouth students and often collaborates with the Dartmouth Chamber Orchestra. Its performances feature a variety of works, ranging from baroque to contemporary music.

=== Dartmouth Chamber Orchestra ===
Founded as an offshoot of the Music Department's conducting class, the Dartmouth Chamber Orchestra was founded by Katherine Domingo '96 and has become famous as the school's only student-run orchestra. A student conductor and president choose the music and set the venues for each concert, which consist of a wide variety of music. Though the group receives no official funding from the school, the Dartmouth Chamber Orchestra maintains its presence on campus through help from various grants from the Music Department and the Committee on Student Organizations.

=== Dartmouth College Marching Band ===
The DCMB is the oldest marching band in the Ivy League; it was formed during the 1890s as The Dartmouth Band. The DCMB's instrumentation is chiefly traditional, but also features a keg section (hit with a stick as a percussion instrument) and kazoos. During the fall, the band performs at all home football games, as well as a few away games. The DCMB also has a winter band that performs at hockey, basketball, and other events. The band continues to play traditional fight songs that have been played at Dartmouth football games for nearly a century.

=== Dartmouth Symphony Orchestra ===
The Dartmouth Symphony Orchestra (DSO) is the resident orchestra of the Hopkins Center for the Arts at Dartmouth College. Conducted by Anthony Princiotti, the DSO performs standard works from the symphonic repertoire (while also including some works off the beaten path).

=== Dartmouth Wind Symphony ===
Consisting mostly of non-music majors, the Dartmouth Wind Symphony (DWS) performs three official concerts a year, one each academic term (except for summer), at the college's performing arts center.

=== Friday Night Rock ===
Friday Night Rock is an active student group that brings independent bands and musicians to Dartmouth several times every term for concerts and provides an important alternative social space for students. Concerts are held in Sarner Underground.

== Politics ==
Campus political groups regularly host events for presidential candidates and other well-known politicians in conjunction with Dartmouth's Nelson A. Rockefeller Center for Public Policy. Groups occasionally collaborate in organizing dinner discussions, debates, and events with a bipartisan scope.

=== Dartmouth College Democrats ===
With most Dartmouth students identifying as more liberal, the College Democrats has the largest membership of the three partisan political groups on campus. In addition to working on state and national political campaigns, the group hosts speakers and occasionally lobbies lawmakers when legislation relating to college students is up for debate. In April 2006, the group founded the College Democrats of New Hampshire, a state federation made up of College Democrats organizations at colleges throughout New Hampshire.

=== Dartmouth College Libertarians ===
The College Libertarians are a group of Dartmouth students committed to the cause of liberty who host events and invite speakers to campus to discuss libertarian issues.

=== Dartmouth College Republicans ===
The Dartmouth College Republicans were founded in 1958. It is the founding chapter of the New Hampshire Federation of College Republicans.

=== Dartmouth Political Union ===
The Dartmouth Political Union was founded by William M. Reicher and Vlado Vojdanovski in 2018. Since then, the club has grown to have over three hundred members. The DPU is a “nonpartisan student-run organization dedicated to providing a forum for respectful political discourse on campus” by “promoting facts, seeking nuance, and challenging preconceptions.” The DPU “works to bridge partisan divides and foster respect for the freedom of speech among the Dartmouth student community”.

The DPU has aimed to host engaging speakers, who have included co-founder of the Black Panther Party Bobby Seale, former CIA Director John Deutch, Pulitzer Prize winning journalist Glenn Greenwald, and linguist and political Activist Noam Chomsky. The DPU has also had success in organizing student-led debates and viewing parties for important events. DPU event attendance is among the highest of any club at Dartmouth College.

=== Rockefeller Center ===
The Nelson A. Rockefeller Center for Public Policy and the Social Sciences sponsors numerous dinner discussion groups with strong followings, including PoliTALK, Daniel Webster Legal Society, Women in Leadership, Agora, First Year Forum, and Vox Masters.

== Publications ==
Dartmouth features two independently funded newspapers, The Dartmouth and The Dartmouth Review. The Dartmouth Jack-O-Lantern is a humor magazine. Dartmouth's Collegiate Journal of Art History is the first such academic art history journal in the country. Other campus publications include the Dartmouth Law Journal, Dartmouth Undergraduate Journal of Science, and Lifelines literary journal. The Aegis is Dartmouth College's yearbook.

== Radio ==
Dartmouth Broadcasting is a self-supported student organization that operates two radio stations, WFRD-FM and WDCR-AM. WFRD is one of the few fully commercial college radio stations in the United States.

== Recreation ==
=== Dartmouth Billiards Student Organization ===
The Dartmouth Billiards Student Organization (DBSO) was founded in 2022.

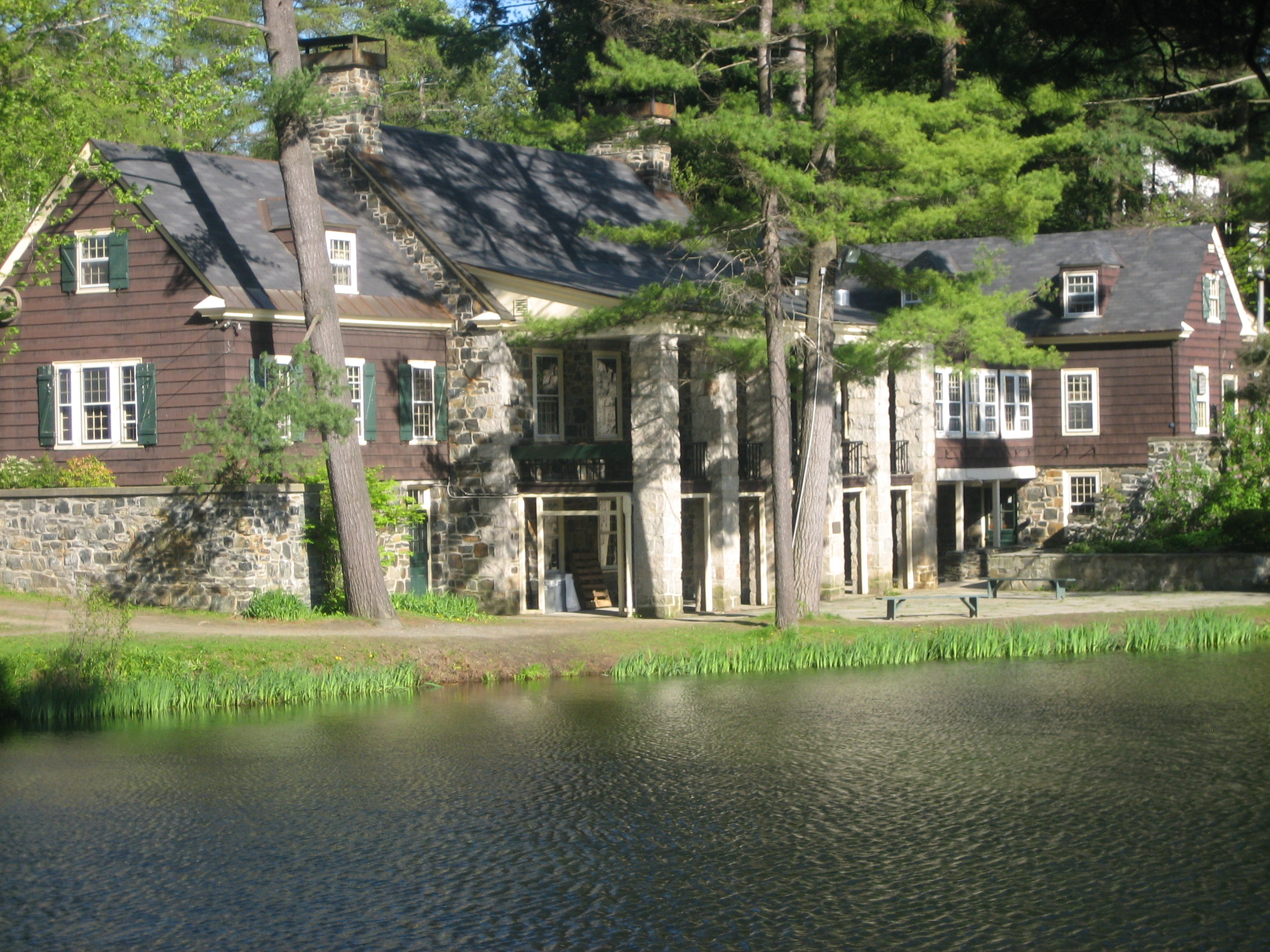
Dartmouth Outing Club's cross-country ski center on Occom Pond.

=== Dartmouth Outing Club ===
The Dartmouth Outing Club (DOC) is the oldest and largest collegiate outing club in the United States, founded in 1909 to stimulate interest in winter sports. The DOC includes many subgroups, including The Big Green Bus and Dartmouth Ski Patrol.

=== Dartmouth Union of Bogglers ===
The Dartmouth Union of Bogglers (DUB) is a college-recognized club founded in 2020 to promote and organize games of Boggle for members of the Dartmouth community.

== Senior societies ==
Student literary or fraternal societies of Dartmouth College date back to 1783. Starting in the late nineteenth century, students began creating societies for each of the four class years. Only the senior societies survive from those early class societies, and new ones have been added in recent years. Almost all keep their membership secret until commencement, when members of most senior societies may be identified by their carved canes. Most societies have gained official recognition by the College as organizations. However, some of the newer societies continue to operate underground. Approximately 31 percent of the senior class members are affiliated with a recognized senior society today.

Society	Charter date	Membership	College-recognized	Ref.
Abaris	1996	Seniors	Yes	
Andromeda	2013	Senior women	Yes	
Atlas	2013	Seniors	Yes	
Casque and Gauntlet	1886	Seniors	Yes	
Chimera	1914	Seniors	Yes	
Clio	2020	Seniors	Yes	
Cobra	1978	Senior women	Yes	
Dragon	1898	Senior men	Yes	
Fire and Skoal	1975	Seniors	Yes	
Griffin	1995	Seniors	Yes	
Ministry	1999	Seniors	Yes	
The Order of the Sirens	2007	Senior women	Yes	
Olympus	2014	Seniors	Yes	
Osiris	2016	Seniors	Yes	
Palaeopitus	1899	Seniors (honor society)	Yes	
Phoenix	1984	Senior women	Yes	
Phrygian	2005	Senior men	No	
Pyxis	2014	Senior women	Yes	
Raven	2024	Seniors	Yes	
Sphinx	1885	Senior men	Yes	
Tyger	1892	Senior men	Yes	

=== Abaris ===
Abaris was founded in 1996 as a society to recognize both male and female campus leadership, with the mission of uniting diverse and dynamic individuals to create change in the Dartmouth community. The society takes its name from Abaris the Hyperborean, who, according to Greek mythology, served as a priest and messenger for the god Apollo. With the powers of prophecy and healing, endowed unto him by a golden arrow, Abaris traveled throughout his land, performing great deeds for his people. The society is a diverse set of campus leaders and is known for a combination of revelry, mischief, and philanthropic endeavors. Membership in Abaris remains secret until graduation. Many notable Dartmouth alumni were involved with Abaris during their final undergraduate years.

=== Andromeda ===
Andromeda is a recognized all-female secret society. Andromeda selects a small number of women from the rising senior class each year, extending membership to campus leaders in athletics, Greek houses, and other organizations. The group takes its name from the Andromeda Galaxy and brings together bold women from across campus. Members carry canes at Commencement.

=== Atlas ===
Atlas is a co-ed college-recognized society that emphasizes character and intellect in the selection of its members. Its historical mission is "to augment its members' educations through dialogue about the world and their place in it."

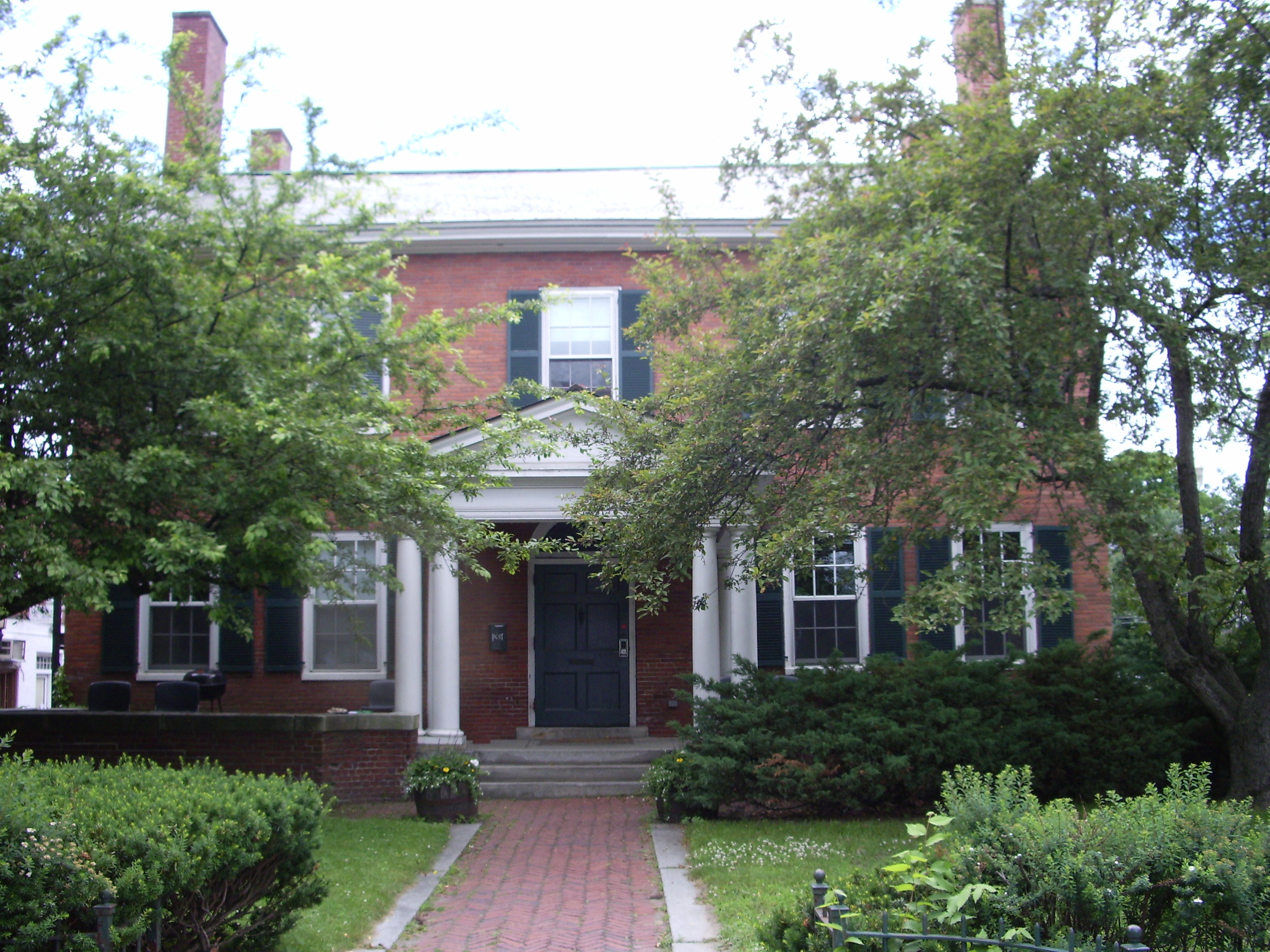
Casque and Gauntlet house

=== Casque and Gauntlet ===
Casque and Gauntlet was founded in 1886. In 1893, the group moved to its current location at 1 South Main Street. Its membership is co-ed, exclusive, and not secret. Notable members of past delegations include Theodor Seuss Geisel (Dr. Seuss), Nelson Rockefeller, and Hank Paulson.

=== Chimera ===
Chimera Society coat of arms

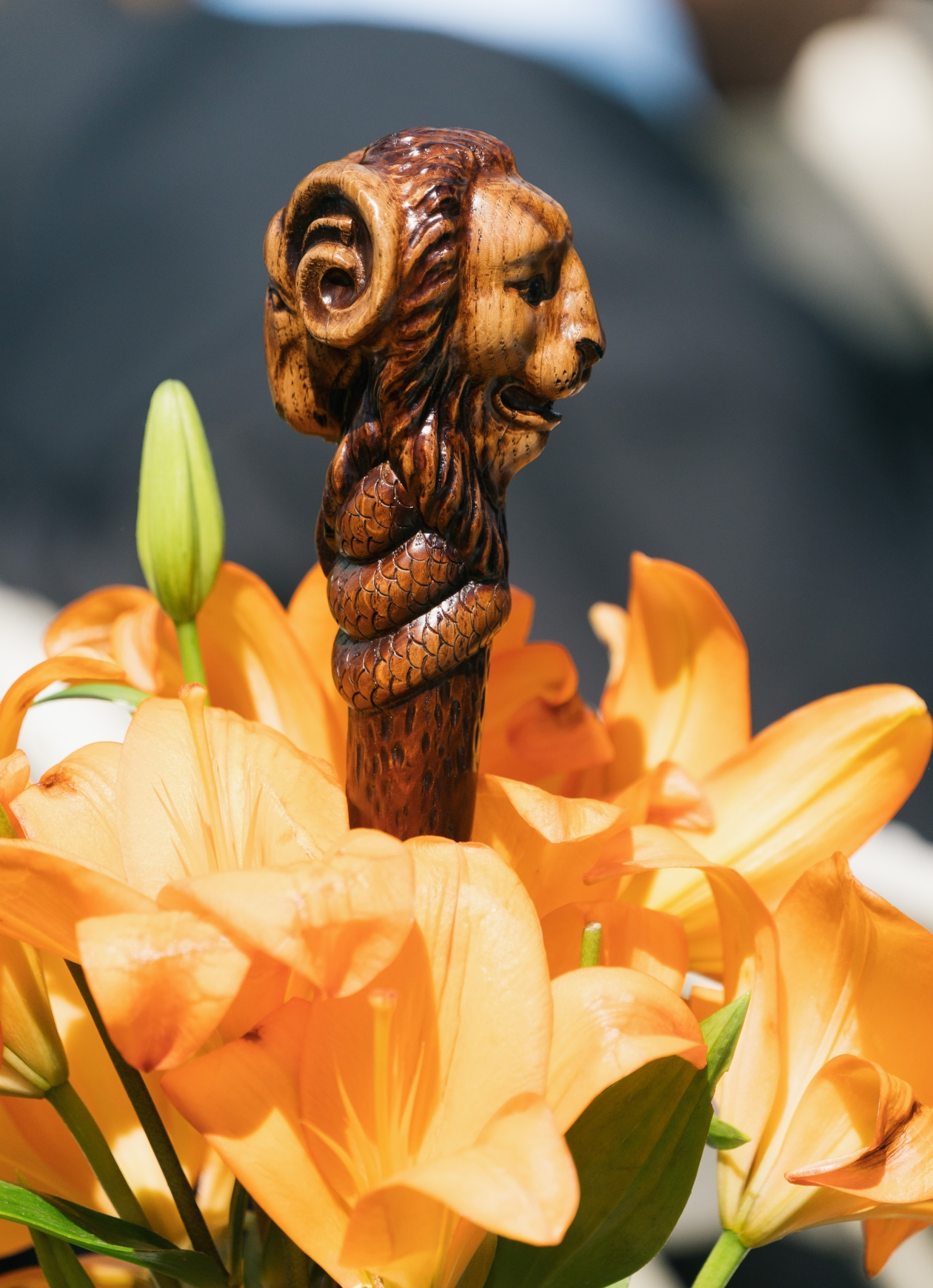
Chimera cane

Chimera was founded in 1914. It is a co-ed secret society, accepting female students sometime after Dartmouth first accepted female students in 1972. The society selects a small number of new members each year through its traditional tapping process. At graduation, members carry hand-carved wooden canes depicting the Greek mythological monster Chimera. The Triad Trust Association is the business name of Chimera. The association is a registered non-profit corporation to hold Chimera's assets, including its endowment, and serves as the society's alumni board.

=== Clio ===
Founded in 2020, Clio is a co-educational secret society that celebrates its namesake, the ancient Greek muse of history. Members carry canes at graduation, along with a second ceremonial item that rotates each year.

=== Cobra ===
Cobra was founded in 1978 as Dartmouth's first all-female senior society. The society occupies a house on Summer Street. Cobra focuses on cross-generational mentorship and selects women on the basis of demonstrated leadership within the Dartmouth community and devotion to the college.

=== Dragon ===
Dragon is an all-male senior society that was founded in 1898. Dragon is said to be the most secret of Dartmouth's senior societies, as its members do not carry canes at commencement.

=== Fire and Skoal ===
Fire and Skoal was founded as Dartmouth's first co-educational senior society in 1975. Members are often leaders of fraternities, sororities, and other campus organizations. The society is recognized by the college, and members carry canes at graduation.

=== Griffin ===
Griffin is a co-educational secret society founded in 1994. As one of the oldest co-ed groups on campus, Griffin selects an equal number of men and women from the rising senior class to join each year, but many of the society's traditions remain a secret. Members carry canes at Commencement and often include leaders from various campus organizations, athletic captains, and Greek leadership. Notable members include Olympic gold medalist shot putter Adam Nelson.

=== Olympus ===
Olympus is a co-ed secret society formed in 2014. The society's namesake is rooted in Greek mythology, with little else known of its traditions. The selection process involves identifying student leaders from across campus, and members carry canes during commencement.

=== Order of the Sirens ===
Order of the Sirens is a college-recognized all-female secret society and was originally founded in 2007. The women of "The Order" are commonly referred to as "Sirens". Members carry canes during graduation and are known for their signature tattoo.

=== Osiris ===
Osiris is a co-educational secret society named after the Egyptian God of the afterlife, the underworld, and rebirth. It was established in 2016. Membership is extended to established campus figures—leaders of athletic teams, Greek houses, and other influential organizations—who bear a distinctive tattoo as a tribute to the Attributes and carry canes at graduation.

=== Palaeopitus ===
Palaeopitus Senior Society was founded in 1899. The name Palaeopitus is a derivative of the Greek word for "Old Pine". Initially a secret society, Palaeopitus has operated with its membership publicly known in recent years. Membership is regarded as the eldest of the "current crop of 'pines'". Subsequently, leaders of communities on campus generally make up the membership. Unlike other societies, members may belong to other societies as well.

=== Phoenix ===
Phoenix was founded in 1984 and is the second-oldest female senior society. It was previously the Delta Nu chapter of Phi Gamma Delta. In 2020, Phoenix officially opened its membership to non-female and nonbinary leaders.

=== Phrygian ===
Phrygian is an all-male secret society at Dartmouth. Its name comes from the Phrygian Cap, a symbol of liberty. It is devoted to philosophies of individual liberty.

=== Pyxis ===
Taking its name from a triad of stars in the southern sky, the Pyxis constellation, this all-female secret society was founded shortly after the integration of women at the college. It acquires its members from across Dartmouth's campus, including leaders of various organizations on campus, athletic teams, and Greek houses. While little is known about this exclusive group, its members can be identified by a small, chic tattoo.

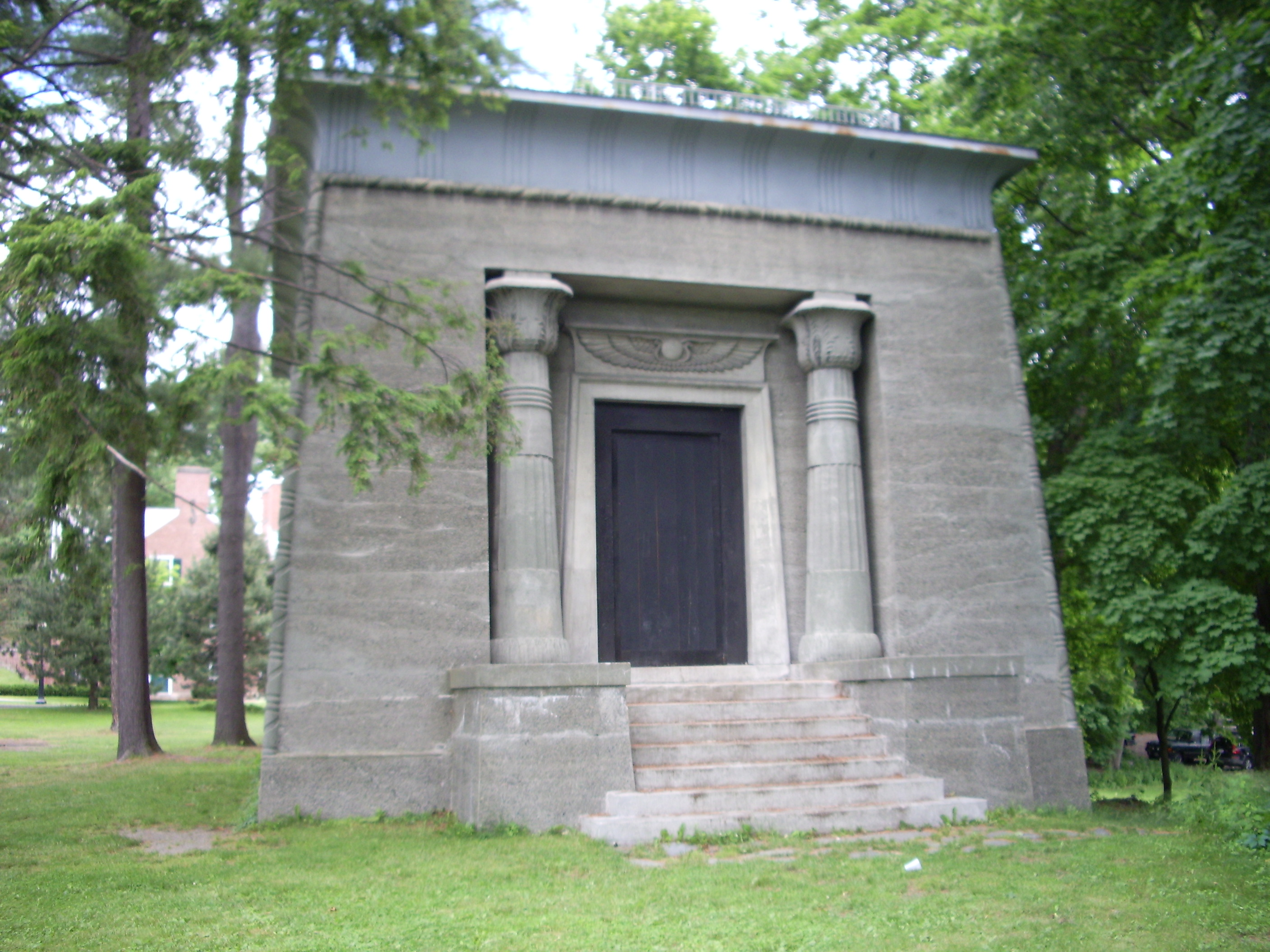
Sphinx tomb, an example of Egyptian Revival architecture

=== Raven ===
Raven is a co-ed society founded in 2024. The society's name references Edgar Allan Poe's 1845 poem The Raven, while also drawing on the bird's traditional associations with intelligence, mystery, and storytelling across a range of cultural traditions.

=== Sphinx ===
Sphinx was founded in 1885 and continues to operate as of 2025 as the oldest senior society at Dartmouth. In 1903, the group moved to its current location on East Wheelock Street, a mausoleum designed by Manchester, New Hampshire architect William Butterfield. Members carry identifying canes at graduation.

=== Tyger ===
Tiger was established in 1892 as a senior society but only lasted for a few years. It was reestablished as Tyger.

== Service ==
=== Dartmouth Consulting Group ===
The Dartmouth Consulting Group (DCG) is a student-run consulting organization that provides a wide range of services for businesses in the Upper Valley region of New Hampshire and Vermont.

=== Dartmouth Emergency Medical Services ===
Dartmouth EMS is a student-run Basic Life Support (BLS) unit licensed by the State of New Hampshire. D-EMS provides emergency medical services to Dartmouth College and is available for standby coverage throughout the Upper Valley. Dartmouth EMS is dedicated to the safety of Dartmouth community members and visitors. Additionally, the group strives to provide as many educational opportunities as possible. D-EMS provides training in first aid and CPR (from the AHA), as well as sponsors EMT classes.

=== Dartmouth Sexual Assault Peer Advocates ===
The Sexual Assault Peer Advocate (SAPA) program at Dartmouth College began in the 1980s as an effort to promote awareness about sexual abuse on the Dartmouth campus. SAPAs help victims contact counselors and other medical advisors, as well as provide information about legal aspects of the process, including reporting to the Hanover, New Hampshire police and to Safety and Security, Dartmouth's security force.

=== Green Key Society ===
Established in 1921, the Green Key Society is an honorary service organization at Dartmouth College. Green Key helps to run such traditional Dartmouth events as First-Year Orientation, the Bonfire, Homecoming Sweep, Commencement, and Green Key Weekend.

== Singing ==
=== The Dartmouth Aires ===
Dartmouth College's oldest a cappella singing group, the Aires, was originally formed as the Injunaires in 1946 as an offshoot of the college Glee Club; the Dartmouth Aires broke with the Glee Club in the late 1970s. The Aires won the Contemporary A Cappella Recording Award (CARA) for Best All-Male Collegiate Album for both their 2003 and 2005 album releases, as well as selection for Varsity Vocals' Best Of Collegiate A Cappella compilation CD in 2003, 2005 and 2008, and selection for the Voices Only compilation CD in 2005, 2006 and 2008. In 2011, they competed in season 3 of The Sing Off, a national reality show, finishing as first runner-up.

=== Dartmouth Dodecaphonics ===
The Dartmouth Dodecaphonics is the college's oldest gender-inclusive a cappella group. The group was created in 1984 by twelve founding members; hence, "dodeca".

=== Dartmouth Brovertones ===
The Dartmouth Brovertones are Dartmouth's second-oldest all-male a cappella group, founded in 1993.

=== Dartmouth College Glee Club ===
A group of more than forty choral singers perform classical works such as the masterworks of choral-orchestral literature, fully staged opera, operettas and musicals, a cappella works, and the cherished songs of Dartmouth College.

=== Dartmouth Cords ===
The Dartmouth Cords is an all-male a cappella singing group founded in 1996, which usually consists of around twenty members. They are known for wearing corduroy to every performance.

=== Dartmouth Decibelles ===
The Dartmouth Decibelles are the oldest all-female a cappella group at Dartmouth College. It was created as the Dartmouth Distractions from the Dartmouth Glee Club in 1976 and later changed its name to Woodswind before finally settling on the Dartmouth Decibelles a few years later.It usually consists of fourteen to eighteen members. They have released six albums.

=== Dartmouth Rockapellas ===
Dartmouth Rockapellas is a social justice-driven a cappella group. Found in 1989, it sheds light on social issues by including at least one "freedom song" in each performance. Members have included actresses Aisha Tyler (a founding member) and Mindy Kaling (class of 2001).

=== Dartmouth Subtleties ===
Dartmouth Subtleties is a historically female a cappella group on campus that was founded in 1998.

=== Dartmouth Sings ===
Dartmouth Sings is one of Dartmouth's gender-inclusive a cappella groups. "Dartmouth's only formerly fictional a cappella group" owes its original name (The Sing Dynasty) to the comedic acuity of Stephen Colbert, who allegedly went to Dartmouth and participated in an a cappella group of the same name.

=== The Dermatones ===
The Dermatones a cappella group was formed at the Geisel School of Medicine by graduate students. It debuted in Gross Anatomy with "Only You" in 1993.

=== Χ.ado ===
Χ.ado is a co-ed Christian a cappella group that was established in 1992. X.ado's name is derived from ancient Greek: "Χ" is the Greek letter chi, the first letter in the word Christos, which means Christ and "ado" means "to sing to or sing for."

== Undergraduate societies ==
Dartmouth recognizes two non-Greek undergraduate societies: Panarchy and Amarna. Both societies are co-ed and open for membership to students that have completed three terms and have a good academic status. Like the Greek organizations, Panarchy and Amarna function as social and residential communities; however, the undergraduate societies are separate from the college's co-ed, fraternity and sorority (CFS) system and unlike affinity houses.

=== Amarna ===
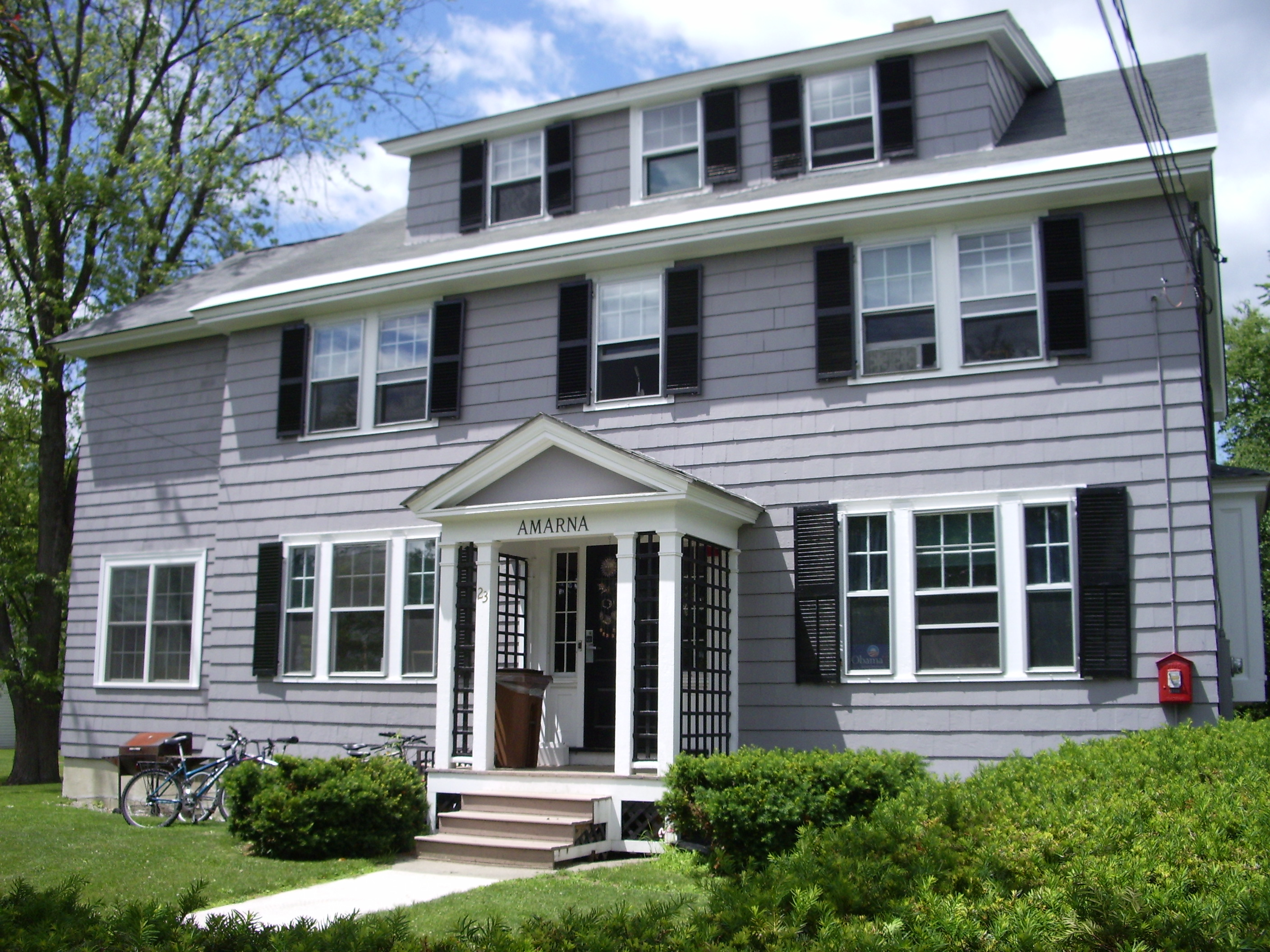
Amarna's house, 2007

The Amarna Undergraduate Society was founded as a newly formed undergraduate society in early 1994. Amarna's formation was inspired by a vocal mine yours debate on the Greek system and Panarchy's recognition as an undergraduate society. The college gave Amarna the house at 23 East Wheelock Street, where the society remains today. It was named after a Middle Egyptian society led by King Akhenaten and Queen Nefertiti.

=== Panarchy ===
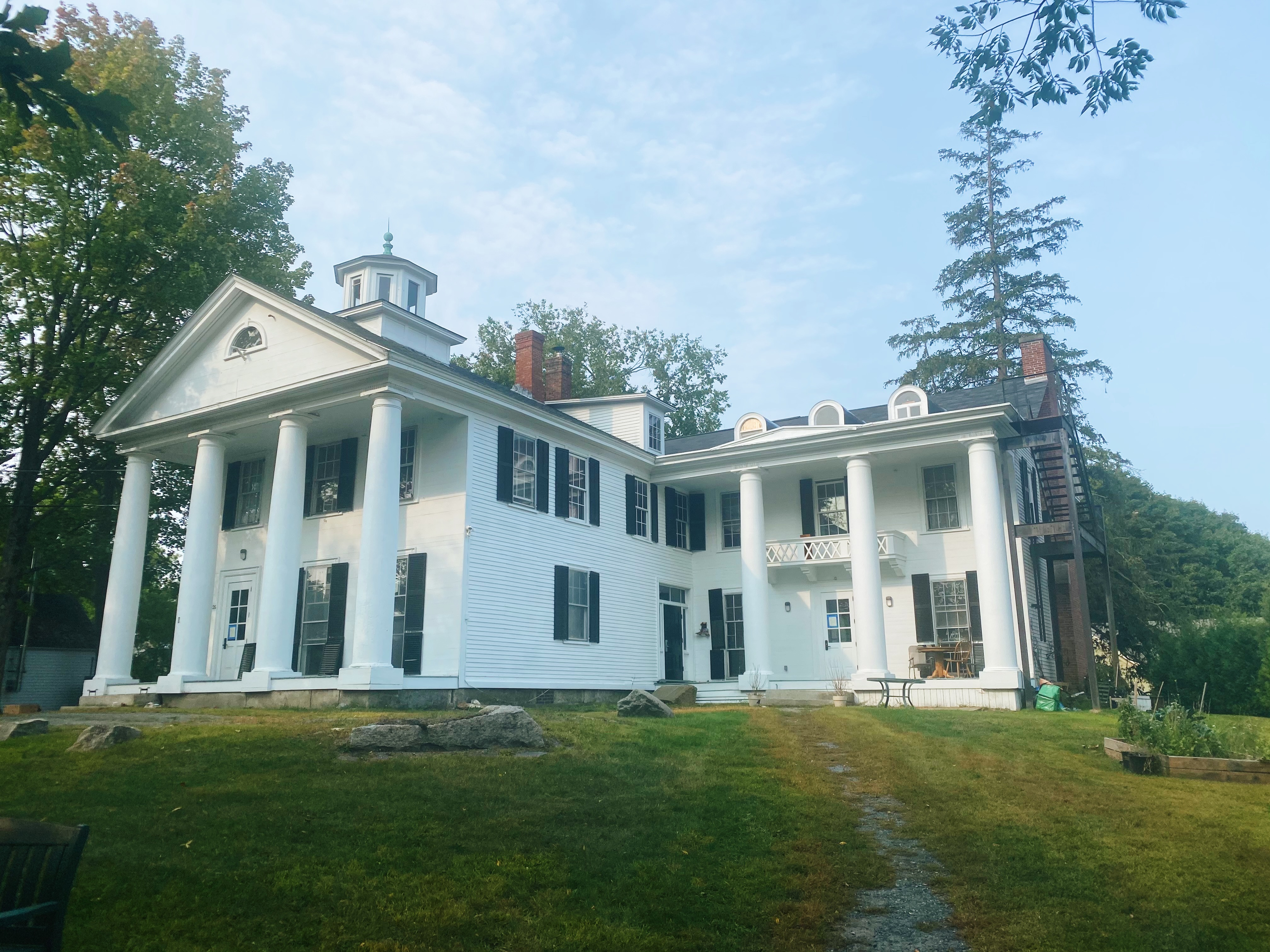
Panarchy's house, 2020

Panarchy became the first college-recognized undergraduate society in September 1993. Panarchy is historically prefigured by Beta Psi, which was absorbed by Phi Kappa Psi, a national fraternity founded at Dartmouth in 1896. Early in the 20th century, the fraternity bought the house at 9 School Street, which was built in 1835 and where the organization continues to reside today. In response to what was perceived as racial prejudice on the part of Phi Kappa Psi's national leadership, Dartmouth's Phi Kappa Psi separated from the national and renamed itself as Phi Sigma Psi in 1967. After years of welcoming female exchange-student boarders, on the first day Dartmouth admitted women in 1972, Phi Psi became the first Dartmouth Greek house to go co-ed. In 1991, the organization changed its name to "Phi Psi/Panarchy". In 1993, the college recognized Panarchy as an undergraduate society independent from the Greek system. Panarchy is known for hosting its "Great Gatsby" party.

== Miscellaneous ==
=== Film Society ===
Established in 1949, the Dartmouth Film Society is one of the country's oldest student-run film societies.

=== Gender Sexuality XYZ ===
Gender Sexuality XYZ (GSX) is made up of students interested in bringing together the Gay, Lesbian, Bisexual, Transgender, Queer, and Allied communities of Dartmouth College. The Gay Straight Alliance, formed in the spring of 1999, was renamed Gender Sexuality XYZ in the fall of 2007.

=== Native Americans at Dartmouth ===
The Native Americans at Dartmouth (NAD) is a student-run organization that supports and celebrates Native and Indigenous students.
