= Panarchy =

Panarchy may refer to:

- Panarchy (ecology)
- Panarchy (Dartmouth), student society at Dartmouth College
- Panarchism, the political philosophy of Gustave de Molinari
