= Skolar =

Skolar may refer to:

- a member of the London Skolars
- J. I. Segal (Yaakov Yitzchak Skolar, 1896–1954), Canadian Yiddish poet and journalist
- SKOLAR, a company founded by Phyllis Gardner (clinical pharmacologist)

== See also ==
- Scholar (disambiguation)
- Skol (disambiguation)
