= Skal =

Skal may refer to:

== Exclamation ==
- Skål, also skál or skoal, an exclamation in a toasting ceremony; see toast

== People ==
- David J. Skal (born 1952), American historian & writer
- Skal Labissière (born 1996), Haitian basketball player

== See also ==
- Skaal (disambiguation)
- Skoal (disambiguation)
- Skol (disambiguation)
- Skoll (disambiguation)
