= Skoll (disambiguation) =

Sköll is a wolf in Old Norse mythology.

Skoll may also refer to:

- Skoll (moon)
- Skoll Centre for Social Entrepreneurship
- Skoll Foundation, a social entrepreneurship foundation based in California
- Hugh Mingay (born 1974), Norwegian musician known as Skoll
- Jeffrey Skoll (born 1965), Canadian engineer and internet entrepreneur
- Lindsay Skoll, British diplomat
- Baylan Skoll, a fictional character in Star Wars

== See also ==
- Skoal (disambiguation)
- Skal (disambiguation)
- Skol (disambiguation)
- Skull (disambiguation)
