= William Lyon Phelps =

American academic (1865–1943)

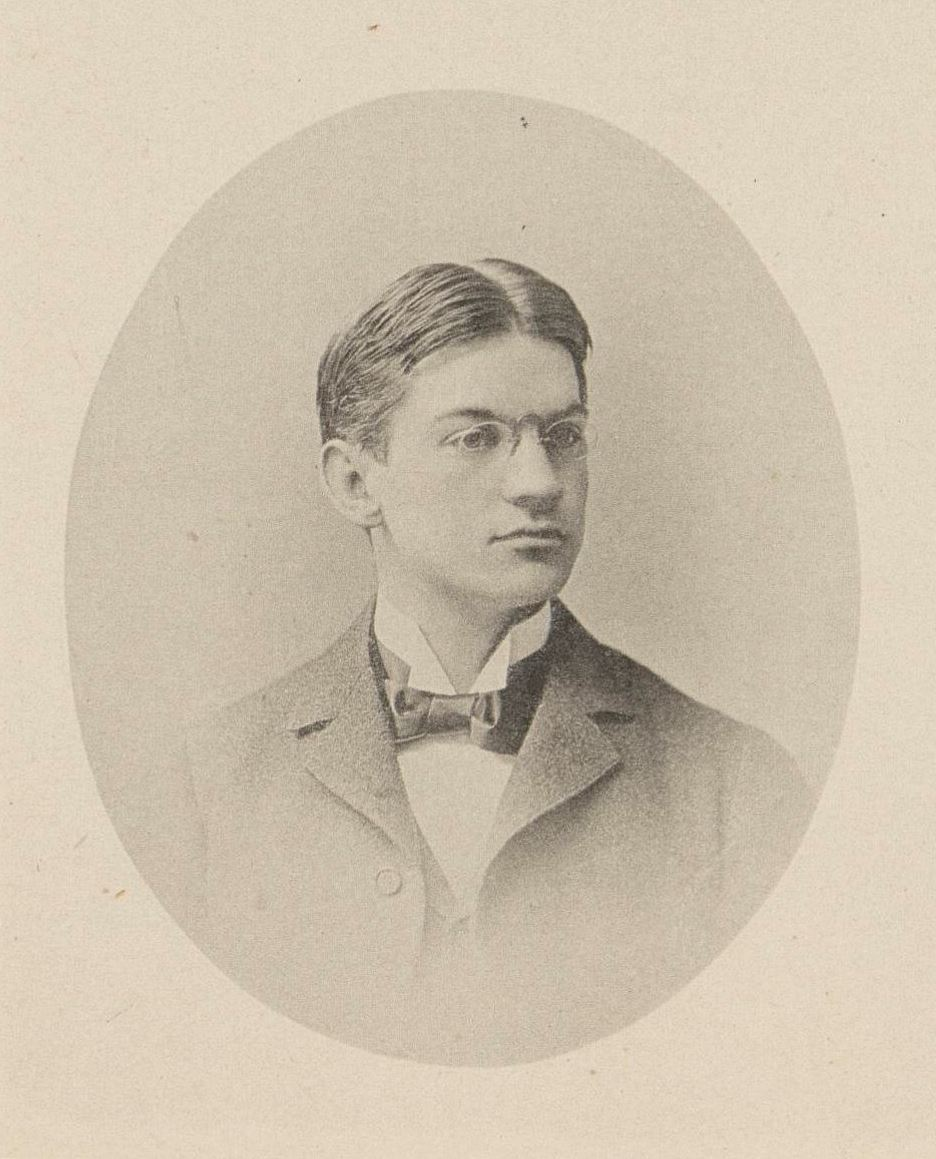
- William Lyon Phelps (1895)
- Born: January 2, 1865; New Haven, Connecticut
- Died: August 21, 1943 (aged 78); New Haven, Connecticut
- Other name: Billy
- Occupations: Professor of English Literature, author
- Known for: Yale University Lampson Professor of English Literature. Taught first American university course in the modern novel.
- Spouse: Annabel Hubbard
- Parent(s): Sylvanus Dryden Phelps, Sophia Emilia Linsley

William Lyon Phelps (January 2, 1865 – August 21, 1943) was an American author, critic and scholar. He taught the first American university course on the modern novel. He had a radio show, wrote a daily syndicated newspaper column, lectured frequently, and published numerous books and articles.

== Early life and education ==
Phelps's father Sylvanus Dryden Phelps was a Baptist minister, and the family had deep ancestral roots in Massachusetts Bay Colony. William, as a child, was a friend of Frank Hubbard, the son of Langdon Hubbard, a lumber merchant who founded Huron City, Michigan.

Phelps earned a B.A. and graduated Phi Beta Kappa from Yale in 1887, writing an honors thesis on the Idealism of George Berkeley. As an undergraduate, he established The Pundits, a secret society.

He earned his Ph.D. in 1891 from Yale and in the same year his A.M. from Harvard.

== Career ==
=== Academia ===
Phelps taught at Harvard for a year, and then returned to Yale where he was offered a position in the English department. He was appointed Lampson Professor of English Literature in 1901.

Phelps's courses were popular and well attended. He had an engaging speaking style. He wrote about English and European literature. During trips to Europe he met many of the leading writers of the turn of the 19th century.

In 1915, Phelps encouraged Alexander Smith Cochran to dedicate the Cochran family's extensive collection of Shakespearean folios and other rare books to endow a private club for the arts and humanities. This became the Elizabethan Club.

He was elected to the American Academy of Arts and Sciences in 1921 and the American Philosophical Society in 1927. Phelps taught at Yale for 41 years before retiring in 1933. From 1941 to 1943 he was the director of the Hall of Fame for Great Americans.

=== Public speaking and writing ===
Phelps often drew large audiences. He lectured on the Town Hall Lecture circuit nationwide. During the summer of 1922, the pastor of the Huron City Methodist Episcopal Church asked him to preach regularly for the season. He had previously preached there, and his afternoon services attracted crowds. The little church was remodeled twice in 1925 and again in 1929 to accommodate the crowds. His wife's parents made substantial contributions that made the expansions possible.

At the height of his speaking popularity, from 800 to 1,000 people attended his summer services. Some first-hand accounts describe overflow crowds sitting outside the packed church so they could listen through the windows. He became known throughout the world as a leading educator, author, book critic, and preacher.

After his retirement from Yale, he continued to present public lectures, radio talks, and write a daily newspaper column about books and authors. He continued to give a series of Sunday sermons each summer and offer a 20-week lecture course in literature during the winter. He presented several college commencement addresses each year and served as a judge of the Pulitzer Prize for literature and on book club selection committees.

== Personal life ==
Phelps's wife, Annabel, inherited her family's estate and William christened it "The House of the Seven Gables,” after the Nathaniel Hawthorne story. Her father had built the house in 1882 on a bluff overlooking Lake Huron. The couple was married on the estate on December 21, 1892, and it became their summer home. Phelps converted the space in front of the house from a trotting track into a private 18-hole golf course in 1899. and they lived there part-time from 1893 through 1933, when he retired, and full-time through 1938. They had no children.

Phelps was athletic and played what was then the new game of baseball as well as golf and lawn tennis. He studied novelists like Leo Tolstoy and Ivan Turgenev. During his first year at Yale he offered a course in modern novels.

In 1938, Life magazine ran an article profiling Phelps's life. His wife Annabel died of a stroke in 1939 and William died in 1943. Phelps bequeathed the house to his niece Carolyn Hubbard Parcells Lucas. In 1951, a museum was opened in the home to house Phelps's library and to focus on the history of Huron City. In 1964, the Pointe aux Barques Life Saving Station house was moved here. In 1987, Carolyn Lucas died, and the William Lyon Phelps Foundation took over the house and museum.

== Selected publications ==
His works include:

- The Beginnings of the English Romantic Movement: A Study in Eighteenth Century Literature (1893)
- Essays on Modern Novelists (1910)
- Essays on Russian Novelists (1911)
- Essays on Books (1914)
- The Advance of the English Novel (1916)
- The Advance of English Poetry in the Twentieth Century (1918)
- Archibald Marshall A Realistic Novelist (1919)
- Essays on Modern Dramatists (1921–1922)
- Some Makers of American Literature (1923)
- As I Like It (1923)
- Essays on Things (1930)
- A Private Library (1933)
- What I Like (in Prose) (1933)
- Autobiography with Letters (1939)
- Marriage (1940)
