= Sage and Chalice =

Student secret society at Yale University

- Founded: Yale University
- Type: Senior society
- Affiliation: Independent
- Status: Active
- Scope: Local
- Chapters: 1
- Headquarters: New Haven, Connecticut; United States

Sage and Chalice is a senior society at Yale University.

== History ==
Like other societies at Yale, Sage & Chalice meets as a group on Thursdays and Sundays. One of the central aspects of meetings is the "bio," in which each member spends one evening recounting his or her life history, personal development, and aspirations to the group.

The society is also known as YPSRT, an abbreviation for the Yale Potato Sack Relay Team. It has ties to Yale Athletics, and its membership has included prominent athletes from Yale's men's football, rowing, lacrosse, and swimming teams, as well as its women's volleyball, field hockey, and lacrosse teams.

The society throws a popular, annual spring fundraising party in New York City open to members of the society and their invited guests.

== Notable members ==
Barbara Bush, daughter of U.S. President George W. Bush, joined the society after reportedly being rejected by Skull and Bones, allegedly because "she was known less for achievement than for partying." Other notable members include professional hockey player Rob O'Gara and Olympic gold medalist Sarah Hughes. Brandon Mangan, a collegiate men's lacrosse coach, was also a member.

== See also ==
- Collegiate secret societies in North America
