= The Pundits =

Secret society at Yale University, US

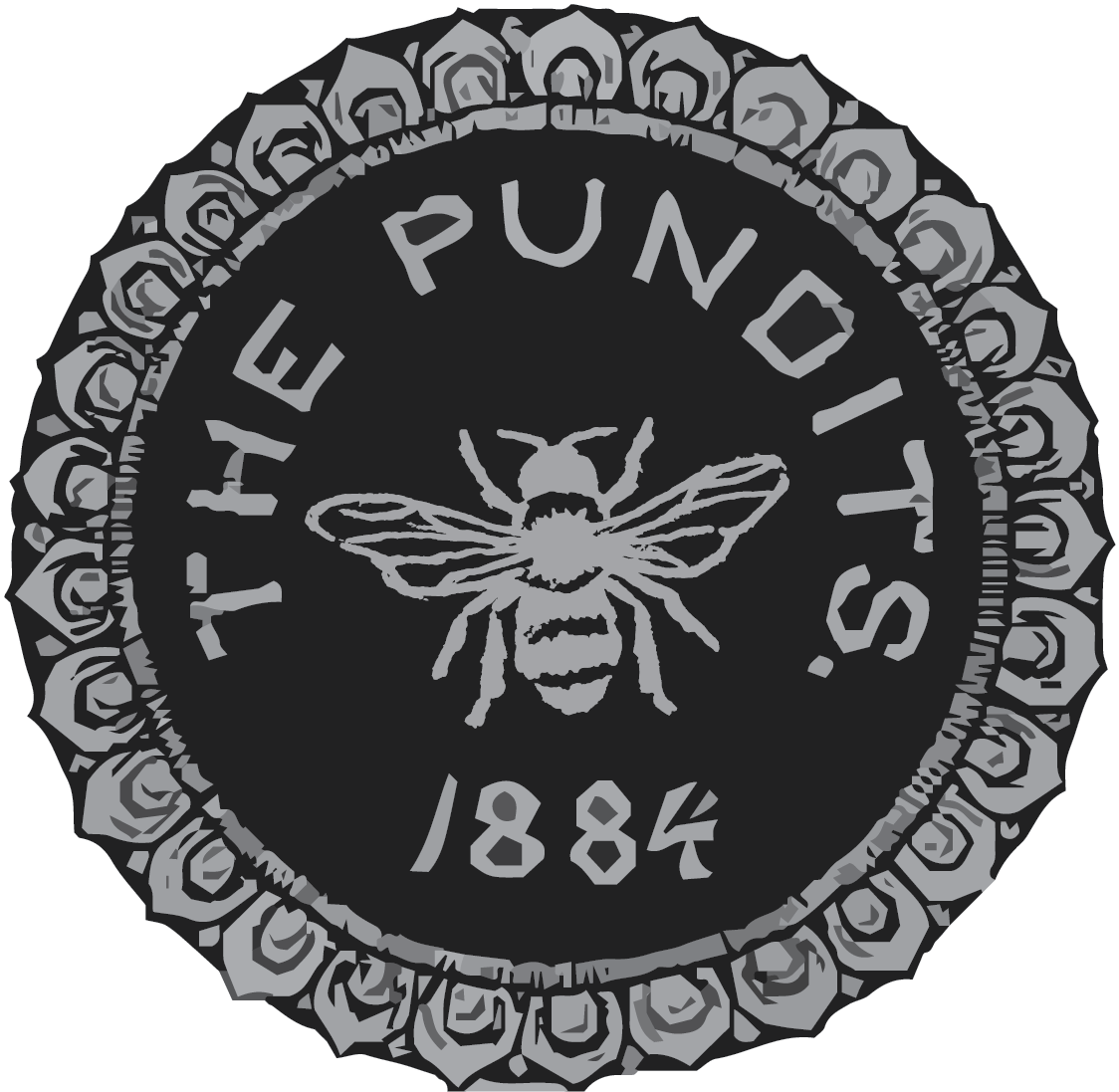
- Founded: 1884; 142 years ago Yale University
- Type: Senior society
- Affiliation: Independent
- Status: Active
- Scope: Local
- Motto: T.B.I.Y.T. B. (The Best is Yet to Be)
- Chapters: 1
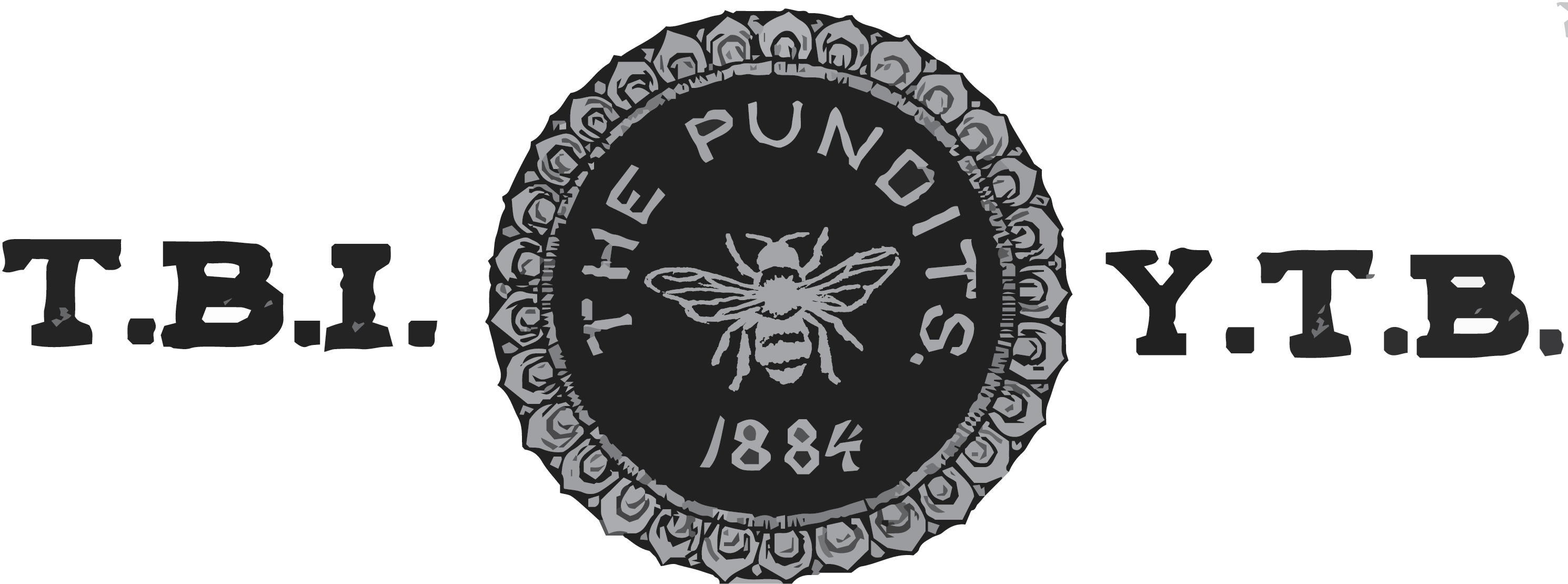
- Logo
- Headquarters: New Haven, Connecticut; United States

The Pundits are a senior society at Yale University in New Haven, Connecticut. The Pundits was founded in 1884 as a literary society and went inactive in the 1970s. It was reestablished in 1994. The Pundits have a tradition of rebelling against Yale tradition, often through elaborate pranks.

== History ==
The Pundits was established in 1884 as a student literary society at Yale University. Its founder was William Lyon Phelps and other members of the class of 1887. The Pundits became known as a society of "campus wits who rebelled against Yale traditions, often through elaborate pranks. It established literary contest for the best essay "on some need of the College and how it may be supplied, or on some tendency of a feature contrary to the welfare of the College, and how it may best be amended."

The Pundits lasted for a year before disbanding. It was reestablished in 1889, and again in 1903 by Ray Morris when Phelps returned to Yale as a faculty member. After going inactive in the 1970s, the Pundits reformed in 1994. The society has a reputation as "Yale's Merry Pranksters", and has been referred to as "the Antithesis of Skull of Bones". The society does not own a building.

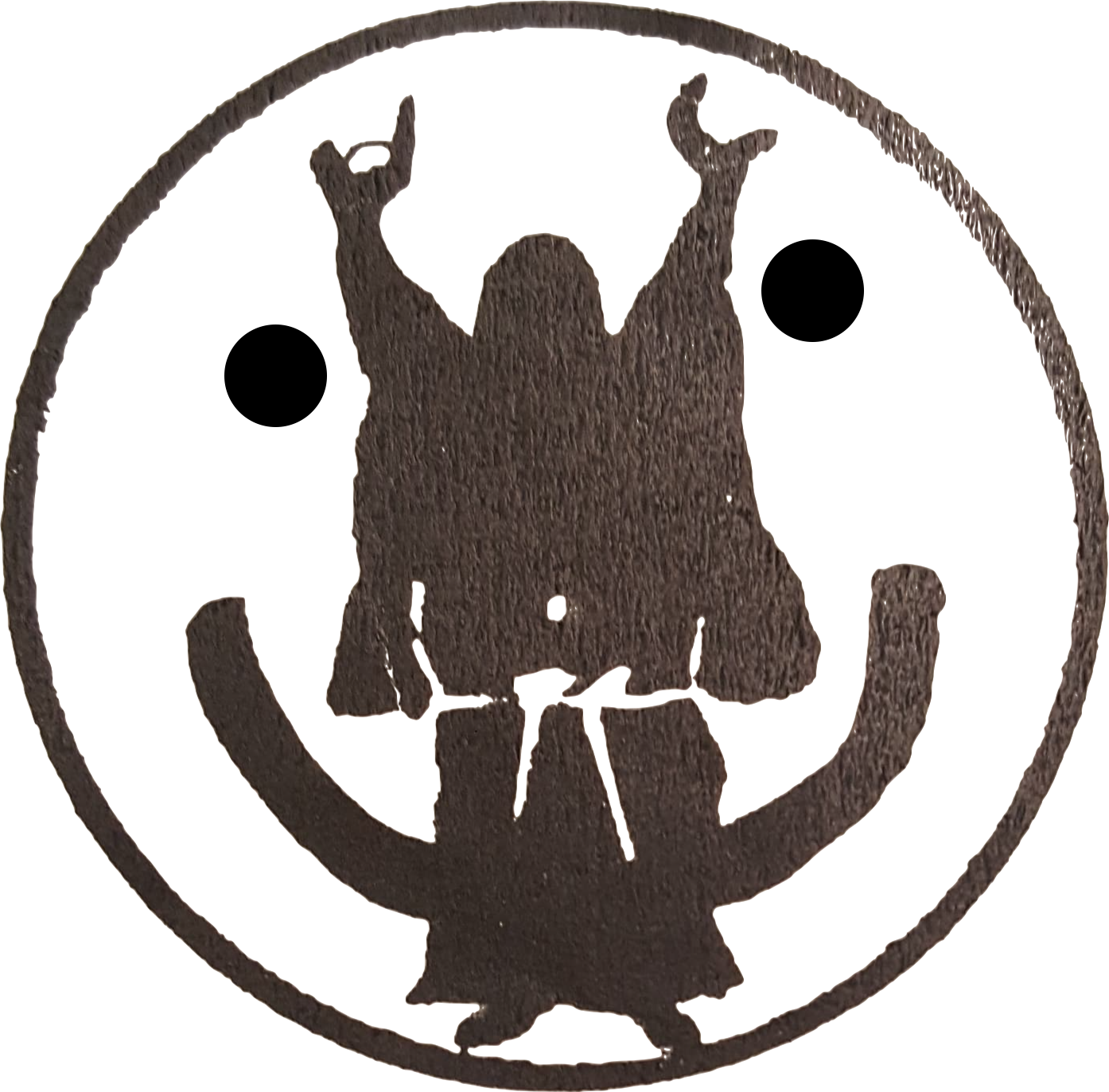
A different version of the Pundits logo, from the Yale Manuscripts and Archives Library

== Symbols and traditions ==
The Pundits accrued many names during its time, including "The United People's Front of La Pundita". The contemporary use of the term "pundit" may have its origins with the Pundits, which developed a reputation for members who were Yale's most incisive and humorous critics of society. The group's late-nineteenth and early-twentieth century focus on lampooning the social and political world was documented in the university's yearbook and the Yale Daily News; these entries of are considered among the first use of the term "pundit" to refer to a critic of or expert on contemporary matters.

The Pundits' song is "T.B.I.Y.T.B.". "T.B.I.Y.T.B." is also the society's motto, meaining "The Best Is Yet to Be". The Pundits call William Lyon Phelps the "Founding Father Pundit" or "Punditus Punditorum Emeritus".

== Membership ==
Membership in the Pundits is limited to fifteen seniors. The Pundits select new members every spring. Its members are allowed to belong to other senior and secret societies on campus.

== Activities ==
Members meet for a weekly dinner and participate in elebroate pranks and lampoons of Yale's clubs, organizations, and societies. The group hosts an annual lobster dinner on the steps of Sterling Memorial Library.

The Pundits is known for hosting naked parties and socials, which the group moderates to make sure they remain safe spaces for the individuals attending. The nudity is described as an experiment in social interaction, and any sexual behavior is prohibited at the parties. The society is also known for allegedly organizing naked runs through the various libraries of Yale.

== Notable members ==
- Kingman Brewster Jr. – United States Ambassador to the United Kingdom, president of Yale University, and Master of University College, Oxford
- William Christian Bullitt Jr. (1913) – United States Ambassador to the Soviet Union and United States Ambassador to France
- McGeorge Bundy – United States National Security Advisor and academic
- Carroll Carstairs (1913) – art dealer
- Russell Davenport (1922) – managing editor of Fortune, and political advisor to Wendell Willkie
- Richardson Dilworth (1921) – Mayor of Philadelphia
- A. Bartlett Giamatti – 19th president of Yale University, Commissioner of Baseball, and President of the National League
- Brendan Gill – journalist
- Alfred Whitney Griswold – 16th president of Yale University
- Deane Keller (1923) – artist who taught at Yale University's School of Fine Arts for 40 years
- John Kerry (1966) – U.S. Senate
- Lewis H. Lapham (1936) – writer with The New Yorker
- Richard C. Levin (1993, honorary) – 22nd president of Yale University
- Joe Lieberman (1965) – U.S. Senate
- Max Millikan (1935) – professor of economics at MIT, assistant director of the Office of Research and Reports at the CIA
- Charles Nagel (1923) – architect
- Dane Neller (1979) – chief executive of Dean & DeLuca
- Austin Pendleton (1961) – actor
- William Lyon Phelps (1884) – professor at Yale University
- Cole Porter (1914) – composer and songwriter
- Katie Porter (1996) – United States House of Representatives
- Zephyr Teachout (1993) – law professor
- Calvin Trillin (1957) – humorist and novelist
- Gene Tunney (1930) – boxer
- Thornton Wilder (1920) – playwright and novelist
- Daniel Yergin – Pulitzer Prize-winning author
