= Frederick E. Goodrich =

American journalist and politician (1843–1925)

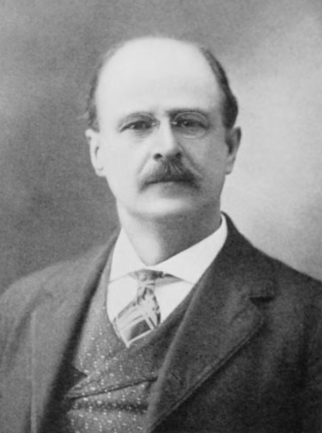
- Born: Frederick Elizur Goodrich; January 15, 1843; Hartford, Connecticut, US
- Died: January 12, 1925 (aged 81); Jamaica Plain, Massachusetts, US
- Education: Yale University
- Occupations: Journalist, politician
- Spouses: Elizabeth Williams Parsons (m. 1866; died 1911) Parnelle Coan (m. 1912)
- Children: 3

Frederick Elizur Goodrich (January 15, 1843 – January 12, 1925) was an American journalist and political figure who worked for The Boston Post for 54 years.

== Early life ==
Goodrich was born in Hartford on January 15, 1843, to Elizur Tryon and Mary Catherine (Beach) Goodrich. He attended Hopkins Grammar School, Hartford Public High School, and Hartford Latin School. He graduated from Yale University in 1864. During his senior year he was a member of the Yale crew, member of Spade and Grave, and president of the Beethoven Society.

== Career ==
Goodrich began his career as an assistant editor at the Trenton Monitor. In 1865 he became an editor for the Hartford Courant. In 1868 he began his long career at The Boston Post as an assistant editor. In 1873 he succeeded Charles Gordon Greene as the paper's editor-in-chief.

In 1878, Goodrich left the Post for a career in general literary works and public office. From 1879 to 1881, he was the private secretary to Boston mayor Frederick O. Prince. In 1883, the Democratic majority council elected Goodrich Boston city clerk over longtime nonpartisan incumbent Samuel F. McCleary Jr., ending the McCleary family's 60 year hold on the office. He was reelected in 1884, but was defeated in 1885. He then returned to journalism as an editorial writer for the Boston Advertiser. From 1888 to 1890, he was the chief clerk to Leverett Saltonstall II, collector of customs for the port of Boston.

From 1890 to 1895, Goodrich was co-editor (with Edward Everett Hale) of the Boston Commonwealth. He then rejoined the Post as an editorial writer and continued writing for the paper until his death. He also authored two biographies - one on General Winfield Scott Hancock and another on President Grover Cleveland, wrote fiction for a number of magazines under the nom de plume Frederick Tryon, and served as an arts critic for various publications.

== Personal life and death ==
Goodrich married Elizabeth Williams Parsons on November 20, 1866. They had two sons and one daughter. Elizabeth Goodrich died on August 4, 1911. On September 28, 1912, he married Parnelle Coan (née Fiske). Goodrich died on January 12, 1925, at his home in Jamaica Plain. His cause of death was bronchial pneumonia. He was cremated and buried in West Brookfield Cemetery.

Political offices
Preceded by Samuel F. McCleary Jr.	Boston City Clerk; 1883–1885	Succeeded by Augustus N. Sampson
Media offices
Preceded by Charles Gordon Greene	Editor-in-Chief of The Boston Post; 1873–1878	Succeeded by George F. Emery
