= Spade and Grave =

Secret society at Yale University, US

- S&G
- Founded: 1864; 162 years ago Yale University
- Type: Senior society
- Affiliation: Independent
- Status: Active
- Scope: Local
- Chapters: 1
- Nickname: S.L.M.; Diggers; Graves; Graves men
- Headquarters: New Haven, Connecticut; United States

Spade and Grave (S&G), also called S.L.M., is a senior secret society at Yale University in New Haven, Connecticut. Founded in 1864, it is one of Yale's oldest societies.

== History ==
Spade and Grave grew out of a quarrel in the class of 1864. That year, the Yale Literary Magazine had five editors—three who were members of Skull and Bones and two who were "neutral". In February, an article was published that discussed the ways men manipulated their way into Skull and Bones and made unflattering comments about some of the Bonesmen The three Bonesman editors voted to censor the article and seized all printed copies of the magazine.

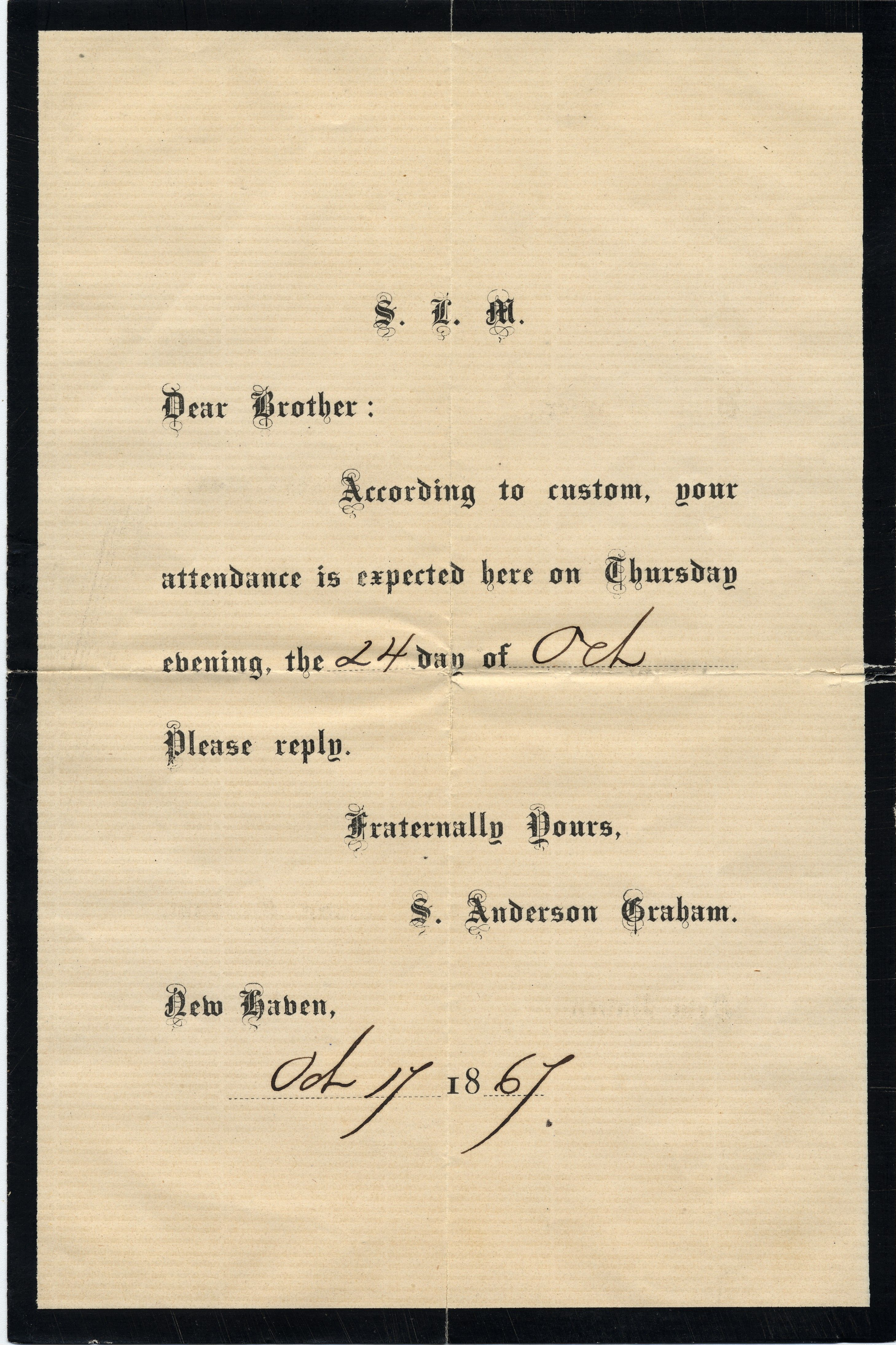
S.L.M. invitation, October 1867

One of the neutral editors disagreed with this decision and called a class meeting; the class voted to support the neutral editor and demanded that the Bonesmen return the seized magazines. When the Bonesmen failed to comply, the class expelled them from office and replaced them with three neutral editors. Instead of accepting this ruling, the Bonesmen printed their own version of the February issue, resulting in two competing magazines from two editorial boards. In reality, the Bonesmen editors were in the right as the senior class had no authority over the matter.

The five neutral editors formed an opposition society with ten classmates. The new group's badge debuted in the summer of 1864 and its insignia mocked the Bonesmen with a gravedigger tossing a skull with his spade. The society's name came from this insignia. Originally, they were called the Graves or Graves men, before settling on the Diggers. Its rivals called it "Bed and Broom".

The Diggers' first delegation of fifteen members was tapped for 1865. The society was housed in elegantly furnished rooms in the Lyon Building on Chapel Street. In addition to billiard tables, Spade and Grave had a room that was completely covered in black velvet. Nevertheless, it eventually had financial problems, and a Yale historian notes that the group "was always despised and looked down upon" because of its controversial start. In June 1868, all of its elected delegations turned down the invitation to join.

=== S.L.M. ===
In the fall of 1867, the group attempted to rebrand itself as Crown and Scepter or S.L.M. (pronounced Slim); a new badge was issued to its delegation in 1868. Although freshmen were willing to call the group Crown and Scepter or Sword and Cross, upperclassmen continued to call the society by its former name. The October 10, 1868 issue of The College Courant questioned whether this truly was a new senior society or "a posthumous offspring of the defunct Spade and Grave". The publication's editors noted:

We are told, on the one hand, that this new society occupies the hall of the old one, which induces us to believe that they are one and the same thing. On the other hand, the new pin, although it retains a portion of the old design, would seem to indicate that this young institution is not responsible for the debts of its bankrupt predecessor.

The society lost its rooms to Theta Psi in February 1870 and went inactive after the 1871 delegation. However, some sources indicated an inactive date of 1869.

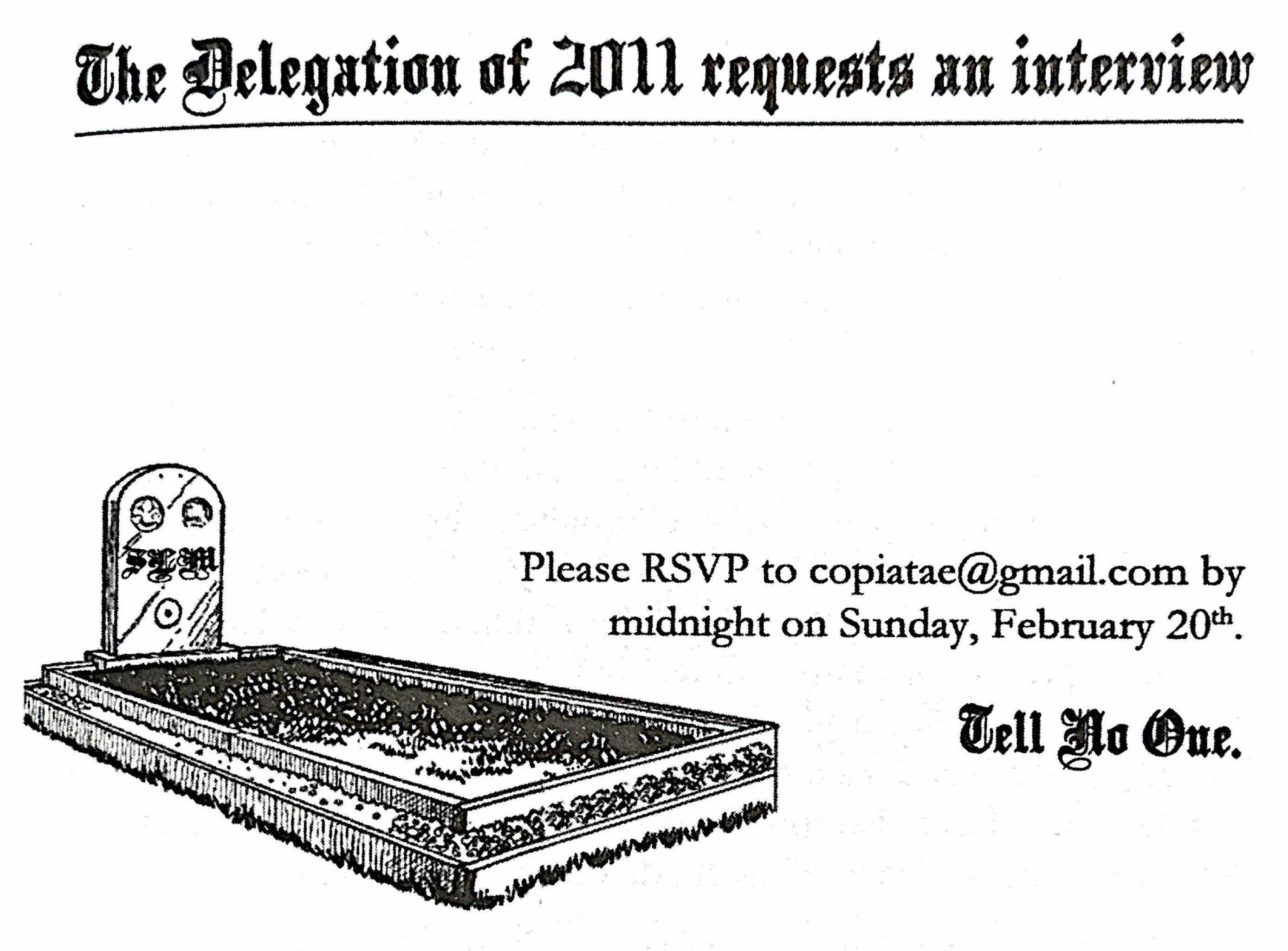
Spade and Grave invitation, February 2012

=== Reestablishments ===
Spade and Grave was reestablished in 1951 by John Curtis Perry. In the 1960s, its house burned and the group moved to rented quarters. It went inactive in 1970 and was re-established in 1999. The society purchased an off-campus house or tomb around 2015 but the property is not identified with signage.

== Symbols ==
Spade and Grave's insignia is based on the scene from Hamlet in which the gravedigger tosses up Yorick's skull with his spade. This slyly referenced its hostility with Skull and Bones. Spade and Grave's original badge was of gold and was produced in two size variations. It consisted of a grave that was over an inch long. There was a spade, partially dug into a grave and resting on a footstone. The grave's headstone featured a crown.

In 1868, the S.L.M. recruits wore a new badge featuring a crown with a crossed sword and scepter. In addition, the name Spade and Grave was replaced with the letters S.L.M. These letters represented the motto "Scepirum Ligonibus Mors" or "Death of the Scepter".

== Notable members ==
- Frederick E. Goodrich (1864) – journalist and political figure
- Edwin Meese (1952) – 75th Attorney General of the United States
- John Curtis Perry (1952) – East Asian and Oceanic studies professor and historian
- Dick Celeste (1959) – 64th Governor of Ohio
- Jonathan Fanton (1965) – President Emeritus of the American Academy of Arts and Sciences and The New School
- John Rothchild (1967) – writer and Time and Fortune columnist

== See also ==
- Collegiate secret societies in North America
