= Nacoms =

Secret society at Columbia University

- Founded: April 23, 1898; 127 years ago Columbia University
- Type: Senior society
- Affiliation: Independent
- Status: Active
- Scope: Local
- Chapters: 1
- Headquarters: New York City, New York (state); United States

The Senior Society of Nacoms is a student secret society at Columbia University in New York City, New York. It was founded in 1898. A senior society, Nacoms taps fifteen juniors each year.

== History ==
The Nacoms were founded on April 23, 1898, at Columbia University. Its purpose was "bring[ing] together in their junior year a few of the men in each class, who have done the most for the University, and at the same time stand well in their college work", with the hope "that the society will have a beneficial influence in college affairs". Though from the beginning it was intended to have fifteen members each year, for its first year, several tapped students were unable to join on account of the organization's secrecy, so it started with twelve members.

Controversy surrounding the roles and secrecy of the senior societies cropped up in 1954. Students complained about the society's failure to comply with the university's regulations surrounding student organizations. While all groups were required to be under the jurisdiction of, and responsible to, the Committee on Student Organizations (CSO), the Nacoms were not registered with the committee and were therefore exempt. Additionally, the society did not provide a copy of its constitution to the committee or made the purposes of their organizations clear, as was required, and their secrecy made it impossible to discern whether they "conduct[ed] their meetings and programs in a responsible manner as members of the University community". The Columbia College student body voted in May of that year to recommend to the university administration that it compel the senior societies to register with the CSO, 832 to 447, as well as force it to submit monthly reports on their activities to the dean of the college, 663 to 599.

In January 1955, Nacoms was placed under the direct jurisdiction of the Dean's Office, bypassing the CSO. Their secrecy was not abolished, and the deans announced that they did not intend to ask for monthly reports. At the time, four deans were honorary members of either the Nacoms or its counterpart, Sachems. The society is supported by a "modest" endowment, though when asked by The New York Times, neither of the deans of students of Columbia College or the School of Engineering would comment on the sizes of said endowments.

The Nacoms is dedicated to performing "discrete service" to Columbia College in cooperation with the school administration. Although most of its contributions are anonymous, it is known to have donated a CAVA ambulance. In 2020, The Senior Society of Nacoms incorporated in New York as a 501(c)(4) educational service organization.

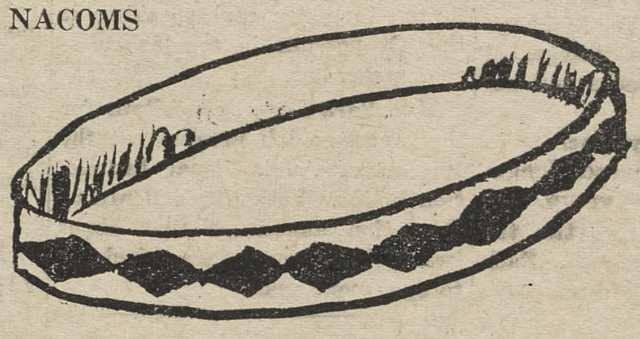
The ring worn by the Nacoms, as depicted by the Columbia Daily Spectator

== Symbols ==
The name Nacoms is a reference to the nacom, a Maya official who served as the principal military head of the Mayan city-state. Members of the society can be identified by the gold ring with thirteen black diamonds that is worn on the little finger of left hand.

The Nacoms initiates its members through a ceremony in which members wear robes, hold candles, and lead blindfolded initiates through an obstacle course in St. Paul's Chapel.

== Membership ==
A senior society, Nacoms taps fifteen juniors each year, often the most influential student leaders on campus. It has been known to elect faculty as honorary members.

Until 1952, the society published the names of its newly elected members in the Columbia Daily Spectator, as well as in The New York Times on occasions. Various political figures have been suspected of being members of the Nacoms, but given the secrecy of the society, such suspicions have been difficult to verify.

== See also ==
- Collegiate secret societies in North America
- List of senior societies
- Sachems
