= Friars Senior Society =

American collegiate secret society

- Founded: 1899; 127 years ago University of Pennsylvania
- Type: Senior society
- Affiliation: Independent
- Status: Active
- Scope: Local
- Chapters: 1
- Members: 32 to 36 active 2,065 lifetime
- Headquarters: 241 S. 6th Street, Suite #1603; Philadelphia, Pennsylvania 19106; United States
- Website: friarsseniorsociety.com

The Friars Senior Society, commonly nicknamed Friars, is one of the oldest senior societies at the University of Pennsylvania in Philadelphia, Pennsylvania. (Note: "Founded in 1899, Friars is the older of the two and has twenty members, while the Sphinx, which got under way in 1900, has the largest membership with twenty-five.") Founded in 1899, it recognizes student leaders who have made a significant contribution to the university in all areas of campus life. The organization remains the most active secret senior society at the university with over 2,000 alumni in the United States and 24 countries throughout the world.

== History ==
First led by Daniel S. Keller Jr., Friars was created "to firmly establish uncompromising democracy in all class, college, and University activities." In the early years, when violent class contests existed between freshmen and sophomores, Friars served as marshals during these fights. The organization was initially restricted to male leaders, with the first co-ed class formed in the spring of 1971. Throughout its storied history, Friars have shaped many aspects of Penn life, such as adding straw hats to Hey Day in 1949 and creating Spring Fling in 1975.

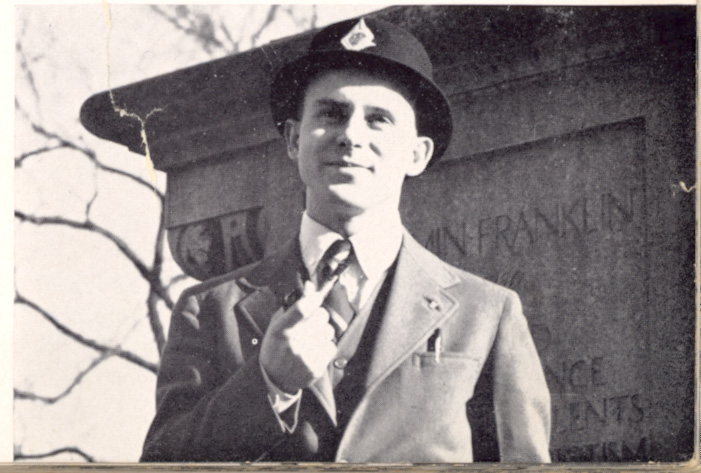
Member wearing a black hat with the society's emblem, circa 1939.

Each full class consists of 30 to 36 seniors. Friars promotes interaction between those from all walks of life who have given their time and energies to making the university what it is; hence, the name Friars, for those who sacrifice their time during college for meaningful activities. The Friars Graduate Board governs the group and organizes activities for both undergraduate and graduate members.

== Symbols and traditions ==
In the early 20th century, Friars wore black hats bearing the society's emblem.

== Activities ==
The Friars annually presents its Faculty Award which recognizes a University of Pennsylvania faculty member for " their area expertise, but their compassion for teaching and their relationships with their students." The group also awards the Peter K. Riley Award to the University of Pennsylvania Outstanding Freshman Male Athlete of the Year and the Elizabeth R. Burdick Award to the Outstanding Underclass Female Athlete at Penn.

Members are encouraged to attend sporting events, shows, and other campus events featuring fellow Friars, and they get together and perform various community service projects throughout their senior year.

== Membership ==
Friars are chosen during the society's Tapping Service. Two-thirds of the group are nominated or "tapped" for membership in the spring of their junior year by current members. The other third is filled in the fall of their senior year through a similar process. Membership is intentionally drawn from all walks of campus: the only common thread is that every member of the society is a recognized senior leader and contributes to the greater Penn community. The group proudly consists of those making a difference in the athletic arena, the performing arts, student government, the Greek system, publications, as well as assorted entrepreneurs and community activists, and organizers. Traditionally, the captain of the men's basketball team, the captain of the women's squash team, the former A capella Council chair, and the chair of Bloomer's Comedy are members of the Friars.

Each year, 90 to 120 prospective members are invited to attend a social event via a hand-delivered invitation; the prospect may then apply for membership and are voted on the current members. Historically, a class consisted of 20 to 25 members, although the founding class had just fifteen members. Today, there are 32 to 36 members in each class. This is divided between 18 and 25 spring recruits who are selected during their junior year and eight to twelve members selected in the fall of their senior year.

The Friars also select one honorary member each year.

== Notable members ==
=== Collegiate ===
- Elizabeth Banks (1996) – Award-winning actress, director, and producer, famous for her role in The Hunger Games movie franchise
- Vanessa Bayer (2004) – American actress and comedian best known as a cast member on Saturday Night Live
- Bo Brown – cartoonist
- Duncan Archibald Bruce (1954) – author and novelist
- Brandon Copeland (1998) – professional football player
- Harold Ford Jr. (1991) – United States Congressman from Tennessee
- Mark DeRosa (1997) – American former professional baseball player
- Jim Finn (1999) – former American football player in the NFL
- Matt Langel (2000) – head coach for the Colgate Raiders men's basketball
- Sam Mattis (2016) – track and field Olympic athlete
- George William McClelland – former President of the University of Pennsylvania
- Jack McCloskey (1948) – NBA Coach and General Manager
- Jonah Meyerson (2013) – actor and television producer
- David Montgomery (1968) – Owner and CEO of the Philadelphia Phillies
- Eugene Nicholas Myers (1954) – oncologist and otolaryngologist
- Brent Novoselsky (1988) – former American football player in the NFL
- Ed Rendell (1965) – Governor of Pennsylvania
- Zack Rosen (2012) – college basketball player
- George Savitsky (1948) – professional football player
- Andrew Toole (2003) – college basketball coach
- Joseph P. Watkins (1975) – pastor of the Christ Evangelical Lutheran Church in Philadelphia and Republican media analyst who often appears on MSNBC

=== Honorary ===
- Jerome Allen (Honorary 2010) – professional basketball player and college head coach
- Walter Annenberg (Honorary 1960) – U.S. Ambassador to the United Kingdom and owner of Triangle Publications, which included The Philadelphia Inquirer, TV Guide, and Seventeen
- E. Digby Baltzell (Honorary 1993) – ociologist, academic, author, and professor emeritus of sociology at the University of Pennsylvania
- Albert C. Baugh (Honorary 1960) – linguist, author, and professor of English at the University of Pennsylvania
- Joe Biden (Honorary 2018) – President of the United States and 47th Vice President of the United States
- Clay Boland (Honorary 1960) – composer of popular songs
- Joseph Bordogna (Honorary 1986) – scientist, engineer, dean of the engineering school at the University of Pennsylvania
- Jean Chatzky (Honorary 2016) – Journalist and financial editor of NBC's TODAY
- Ronald J. Daniels (Honorary 2006) – president of the Johns Hopkins University
- Steve Donahue (Honorary 2019) – head coach of the Penn Quakers men's basketball team
- Fran Dunphy (Honorary 1995) – former Penn and now Temple head basketball coach
- David Eisenhower (Honorary 2010) – author, public policy fellow, and professor at the University of Pennsylvania
- Claire Fagin (Honorary 1986) – former President of the University of Pennsylvania
- Amy Gutmann (Honorary 2004) – United States Ambassador to Germany and president of the University of Pennsylvania
- Sheldon Hackney (Honorary 1998) – former President of the University of Pennsylvania
- Dick Harter (Honorary 1960) – college and professional basketball coach
- Demer Holleran (Honorary 2000) – Professional squash player and coach of the University of Pennsylvania women's squash
- John L. Jackson Jr. (Honorary 2023) – Provost and Richard Perry University Professor at the University of Pennsylvania
- Josh Kopelman (Honorary 2016) – Founder of First Round Capital
- Mike McLaughlin (Honorary 2017) – women's basketball coach for the University of Pennsylvania
- Martin Meyerson (Honorary 1971) – former President of the University of Pennsylvania
- Andrea Mitchell (Honorary 2011) – American television journalist, anchor, reporter, and Chief Foreign Affairs Correspondent for NBC News
- Bruce Montgomery (Honorary 1972) – composer, author, and musical theater performer
- Michael Nutter (Honorary 2009) – Mayor of the City of Philadelphia
- Merle Middleton Odgers (Honorary 1960) – former president of Bucknell University
- Walter O'Malley (Honorary 1960) – Owner of the Los Angeles Dodgers
- Wendell Pritchett (Honorary 2018) – Professor of Law and Education at the University of Pennsylvania Law School
- Froelich Rainey (Honorary 1960) – Anthropologist and Director of the University of Pennsylvania Museum of Anthropology and Archaeology
- Roger Reina (Honorary 2003) – University of Pennsylvania wrestling coach
- Marjorie Rendell (Honorary 1994) – Senior United States circuit judge of the United States Court of Appeals for the Third Circuit and a former First Lady of Pennsylvania
- Brian L. Roberts (Honorary 2016) – Billionaire, chairman, and CEO of Comcast
- Gilbert Seldes (Honorary 1960) – writer, cultural critic, and founding dean of the Annenberg School for Communication at the University of Pennsylvania
- Kevin Stefanski (Honorary 2021) – head coach for the Cleveland Browns of the National Football League
- Lee Stetson (Honorary 1999) – Dean of Undergraduate Admissions at the University of Pennsylvania
- Sarkes Tarzian (Honorary 1966) – Engineer, inventor, and broadcaster
