= Sachems =

Senior society at Columbia University

- Founded: 1915; 111 years ago Columbia University
- Type: Secret
- Affiliation: Independent
- Status: Active
- Emphasis: Seniors
- Scope: Local
- Chapters: 1
- Headquarters: New York City, New York; United States

Senior Society of Sachems is a secret society at Columbia University in New York City, New York. Founded in 1915, the society taps fifteen juniors each year, often the most influential student leaders on campus.

== History ==
The Sachems were founded at Columbia University in 1915. It was established as protest group against the Nacoms, allegedly for the latter's reticence toward Jewish students. The publicly stated reason for their formation, however, was that it was in response to Columbia's growing class size, when it was judged that only one senior society would not adequately to serve the needs of the university's undergraduate student body.

Controversy surrounding the roles and secrecy of the senior societies cropped up at Columbia University in 1954. Students complained about the societies' failure to comply with the university's regulations surrounding student organizations. Sachems had not provided the committee with a copy of its constitution or made the purposes of the organizations clear, as was required, and its secrecy made it impossible to discern whether it "conduct[ed] their meetings and programs in a responsible manner as members of the University community". The Columbia College student body voted in May of that year to recommend to the university administration that it compel the senior societies to register with the CSO, 832 to 447, as well as force it to submit monthly reports on their activities to the dean of the college, 663 to 599.

In January 1955, the society was placed under the direct jurisdiction of the Dean's Office, bypassing the CSO. Their secrecy was not abolished, and the deans announced that they did not intend to ask for monthly reports. At the time, four deans were honorary members of either the Sachems or the Nacoms.

In 2005, the Sachems created their own version of The Gates in Alfred Lerner Hall.

The society is allegedly dedicated to performing "discrete service" to Columbia College in cooperation with the school administration. The Sachems started a university scholarship fund and the tutoring organization Double Discovery Center.

Sachem is supported by a "modest" endowment, though when asked by The New York Times, neither of the deans of students of Columbia College or the School of Engineering would comment on the sizes of said endowment.

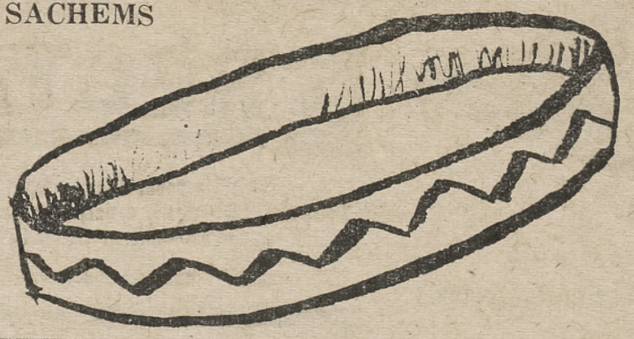
The ring worn by the Sachems, as depicted by the Columbia Daily Spectator

== Symbols ==
A Sachem is a leadership office for many Algonquian peoples, but the term later came to refer to a leader of the New York City political machine Tammany Hall. Sachems initiates new members with a champagne party.

Members of the society can be identified by gold rings with a green zigzag pattern, worn on the little finger of their right hand.

== Membership ==
The society taps fifteen juniors each year, often the most influential student leaders on campus. It has been known to elect faculty as honorary members. Sachems has a standard of privacy more than secrecy. Until 1951, the society published the names of its newly elected members in the Columbia Daily Spectator, as well as in The New York Times on occasions. Sachems now keep its members' names secret until graduation.

== See also ==
- Collegiate secret societies in North America
- List of senior societies
- Nacoms
