= Skaal =

Skaal may refer to:

- Skål, a toast in some Scandinavian languages
- Skaal, a faction in The Elder Scrolls video game series
- Lars Skåål (born 1949), Swedish water polo player

== See also ==
- Norges Skaal, a Norwegian anthem
