= Sphinx Senior Society =

American collegiate senior society

- Founded: 1900; 126 years ago University of Pennsylvania
- Type: Senior society
- Affiliation: Independent
- Status: Active
- Scope: Local
- Pillars: Achievement, Leadership, Commitment, and Character
- Symbol: Sphinx skull
- Chapters: 1
- Members: 30 active
- Nickname: Sphinges
- Headquarters: Philadelphia, Pennsylvania; United States
- Website: www.sphinxseniorsociety.com

The Sphinx Senior Society is one of the oldest senior honor societies (Note: The university's oldest digitized alumni catalog, as well as membership books in the University Archives, has shown the first graduating class of Sphinx Senior Society and of Friars Senior Society to be 1900 and 1899 respectively. The first mention of a senior society at the university can also be found in the 1900 edition of The Record, the yearbook of the College. Publications differ as to which organization they identified as the earliest senior society at the University of Pennsylvania.) at the University of Pennsylvania in Philadelphia, Pennsylvania. The organization, founded in 1900, is self-perpetuating and consists of a maximum of 30 members selected annually. Its members are a diverse and varied, coming from all areas of achievement, community, activities, and backgrounds. Each member is chosen because of the singular achievements of his or her committed leadership to the university, community, and public.

The Sphinx Senior Society, Inc. is a recognized nonprofit organization with 501(c)(3) status.

== History ==
The Sphinx Senior Society was formed in 1899 by graduating members of the Class of 1900 at the University of Pennsylvania in Philadelphia, Pennsylvania. Its purpose was to promote the university's customs, ideals, and traditions. It was the first senior honor society at the university, created to recognize top student leaders who made significant contributions to the campus community.

Members advised the university's administration, proctored exams, oversaw campus elections, provided freshman orientation, and were referees for the annual freshman-sophomore class contests. The society inducted its first Black member in 1952 and women in 1971.

== Symbols and traditions ==
Active members are called Sphinges. Its officers are called the Chief (president), Pharisee (treasurer), and Scribe (secretary). As Sphinx brings together the leaders o Its four tenets or pillars are achievement, leadership, commitment, and character. Originally, its members wore a black and gold cap with the Sphinx skull on Tuesdays.

== Membership ==
The Sphinx Senior Society is self-perpetuating and consists of a maximum of thirty members who are selected or tapped annually; each member selects their replacement.

The undergraduate society consists of 30 members, with 23 being inducted each spring and 7 being inducted each fall. Members, officially called "Sphinges," represent student leaders who have served the university community in some form or manner and are selected based on their character, involvement, leadership, and vision. This membership perpetuates through a "tapping" process every spring, during which current members personally nominate deserving juniors to attend a smoker. This informal smoker provides an opportunity for the taps to pick up an application as well as for the current members to meet and screen nominees before starting the selection process. This process is repeated each fall to tap, select, and induct an additional 7 seniors as members of the given class.

== Governance ==
The Sphinx Senior Society Board of Governors guides, plans and coordinates all activities of the Society, especially expanding alumni outreach and supporting the undergraduate membership. The 17-member Board consists of a President, Vice-President, Treasurer, Secretary, President-Emeritus, and Chief, Pharisee, or Scribe Emeritus from the most recent graduating Sphinx class, as well as eight alumni Members-at-Large elected by the entire Sphinx alumni membership. These alumni members cover as wide a range of Penn alumni classes as possible. The three officers from the current class of the undergraduate membership also serve on the Board in an ex officio capacity.

== Notable members ==
- Mitchell J. Blutt - Executive Partner, J.P. Morgan Chase and CEO of Consonance Capital - 1978
- Bill Carr - Winner of two gold medals at the 1932 Los Angeles Olympics - 1933
- Richard Clarke - National Counterterrorism Center Director under Presidents Bill Clinton and George W. Bush - 1972
- William T. Coleman, Jr. - United States Secretary of Transportation, 1975–77
- Jeffrey Goldberg - Award winning journalist, currently editor-in-chief of The Atlantic - 1987
- Jon Huntsman, Sr. - Billionaire, founder of the Huntsman Corporation - 1959
- John B. Kelly Jr. - oarsman, four-time Olympian, and Olympic medal winner and president of the United States Olympic Committee - 1950
- John Legend - Soul singer, songwriter, and pianist - 2000
- Donald Lippincott - Winner of a silver and a bronze medal at the 1912 Stockholm Olympics - 1915
- Marc Turtletaub - Film producer and director, and, former CEO of The Money Store - 1967
- John Edgar Wideman - Two-time winner of the International PEN/Faulkner Award; currently professor at Brown University - 1963
