= Samuel F. McCleary =

Boston City Clerk
- In office 1823–1853
- Preceded by: Position created
- Succeeded by: Samuel F. McCleary Jr.

Personal details
- Born: April 28, 1780 Boston
- Died: January 12, 1855 (aged 74) Boston
- Party: Federalist
- Spouse(s): Jane Walter (1819–1821; her death); Maria Lynde Walter (1821–1855; his death)
- Profession: Lawyer

Samuel Foster McCleary (April 28, 1780 – January 12, 1855) was an American attorney and government official who served as Boston’s first city clerk. He held the office for 30 years and was succeeded by his son, Samuel F. McCleary Jr., who held it for another 30.

== Early life ==
McCleary was born on April 28, 1780, in Boston to Samuel and Mary (Luckis) McCleary. His grandfather had come to the United States from Belfast on the Sea Flower in 1741 and settled in Boston when the ship, which was bound for Philadelphia, was forced to land in Boston due to hunger that killed the captain and about 40 others. McCleary attended the North Grammar School and was one of Boston's first Franklin Medal scholars.

== Career ==
McCleary studied law in the office of Harrison Gray Otis and was admitted to the bar in 1808. In addition to practicing law, McCleary was also an active member of the Federalist Party. He served as assistant clerk of the Massachusetts Senate in 1810 and 1811 and in 1815 was named clerk of the Senate. In 1822, Senate president John Phillips was elected the first Mayor of Boston and he chose McCleary to serve as the first city clerk. He resigned in 1852 due to poor health and was succeeded by his son, Samuel F. McCleary Jr.

== Personal life ==
McCleary married Jane Walter on May 20, 1819. She died two years later and on May 24, 1821, he married her sister, Maria Lynde Walter. McCleary died on January 12, 1855.
