= Lee Stetson =

American academic administrator

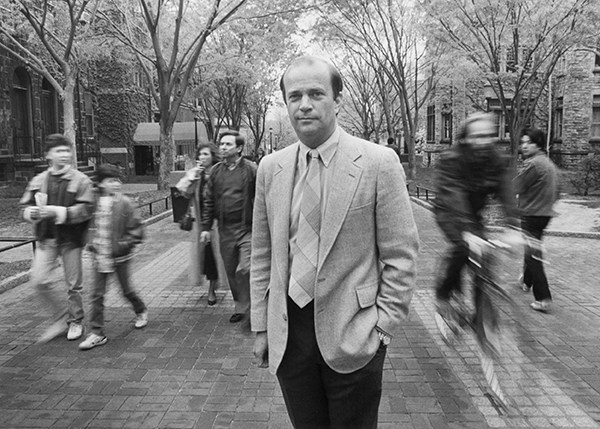
- Stetson in 1987
- Born: Willis Stetson
- Occupation: Former Dean of Undergraduate Admissions at the University of Pennsylvania
- Known for: Consultant on college admissions

Willis Stetson, known as Lee Stetson, was Dean of Undergraduate Admissions at the University of Pennsylvania for 29 years.

== University of Pennsylvania ==
Stetson worked as Dean of Undergraduate Admissions at the University of Pennsylvania for 29 years until 2007. According to former Union College admissions dean Daniel M. Lundquist, he brought "modern college recruiting practices to the Ivy League", and he was known as an advocate of early admission policies which, he argued, attracted a more dedicated cadre of students. In September 2007, Stetson announced his retirement.
