= Dartmouth Undergraduate Journal of Science =

- Discipline: Multidisciplinary
- Language: English
- Edited by: Aditi Gupta, Alex Gavitt

Publication details
- History: 1999-present
- Publisher: R.C. Brayshaw & Co. (United States)
- Frequency: Quarterly
- Open access: Yes

Standard abbreviations
- ISO 4: Dartm. Undergrad. J. Sci.

Indexing
- ISSN: 2167-7883 (print); 2167-7891 (web)
- OCLC no.: 793528773

Links
- Journal homepage; Online archives

The Dartmouth Undergraduate Journal of Science is an open access science journal published by Dartmouth College. It covers original scientific research, multidisciplinary review articles, and science news. In May 2001, the journal was recognized by Nature as a model undergraduate science journal.

The journal is published quarterly in print and online, and weekly science news articles are also made available on "DUJS Online". The Fall 2012 edition introduced its first annual International Science Essay Contest.

== History ==
The journal was started in 1998 by Tim Lesle, Soon Hyouk Lee, Arvindh Kanagasundram, and Amar Dhand and established with the publication of the first issue in the Spring of 1999. The journal expanded its impact on campus over the next few years and launched its website, DUJS Online, to feature more frequent science news articles covering events at Dartmouth and select publications by Dartmouth faculty.

In 2012, the journal further expanded its outreach through a partnership with the Undergraduate Office of Admissions and hosted an International Science Essay Competition for high school students.

In 2020, the journal created another annual international high school competition called Building the Modern MD with the aim of giving students interested in studying pre-medical studies in college a platform to explore the intersection of humanities and medical science.
