= Skol (disambiguation) =

Skol is a global beer brand.

Skol or SKOL may also refer to:

- Skol (album), a 1979 live album by Oscar Peterson
- "Skol, Vikings", the fight song of the Minnesota Vikings
- Skol Airlines, a Russian charter airline
- Skol Company, a 20th-century American manufacturer of sun protection products
- South Kansas and Oklahoma Railroad's reporting mark
- Skol, a vodka brand

== See also ==
- Skoal (disambiguation)
- Skal (disambiguation)
- Skoll (disambiguation)
