= Fire and Skoal =

Senior society at Dartmouth College, US

- FnS
- Founded: 1975; 50 years ago Dartmouth College
- Type: Senior society
- Affiliation: Independent
- Status: Active
- Scope: Local
- Chapters: 1
- Headquarters: 29 South Park Street; Hanover, New Hampshire 03755; United States

Fire and Skoal (also known as F&S or FnS) is a senior society at Dartmouth College in Hanover, New Hampshire. It was the college's first co-ed senior society.

== History ==
Fire and Skoal was founded by five students at Dartmouth College in 1975. Its founders were:

- Jim Bildner
- Tom Denison
- Scott Lochidge
- Tom Quinn
- Tom Thomson

They wanted to established a coeducational senior society based on Elihu Club at Yale University. Fire and Skoal received college recognition and was Dartmouth's first coeducational senior society.

Fire and Skoal is currently a secret society, although it used to be a non-secret or public society. Its purpose was to establish an environment to discuss economic, political, and social issues, as well as providing a way for future leaders to be involved in those issues. The name, Fire and Skoal, came from the "Hanover Winter Song" and refers to the spirit of camaraderie and friendship.

Weekly, Fire and Skoal's members meet to discuss and debate campus and world issues. The society invites professors and guest speakers to their meetings. It also hosts social events.

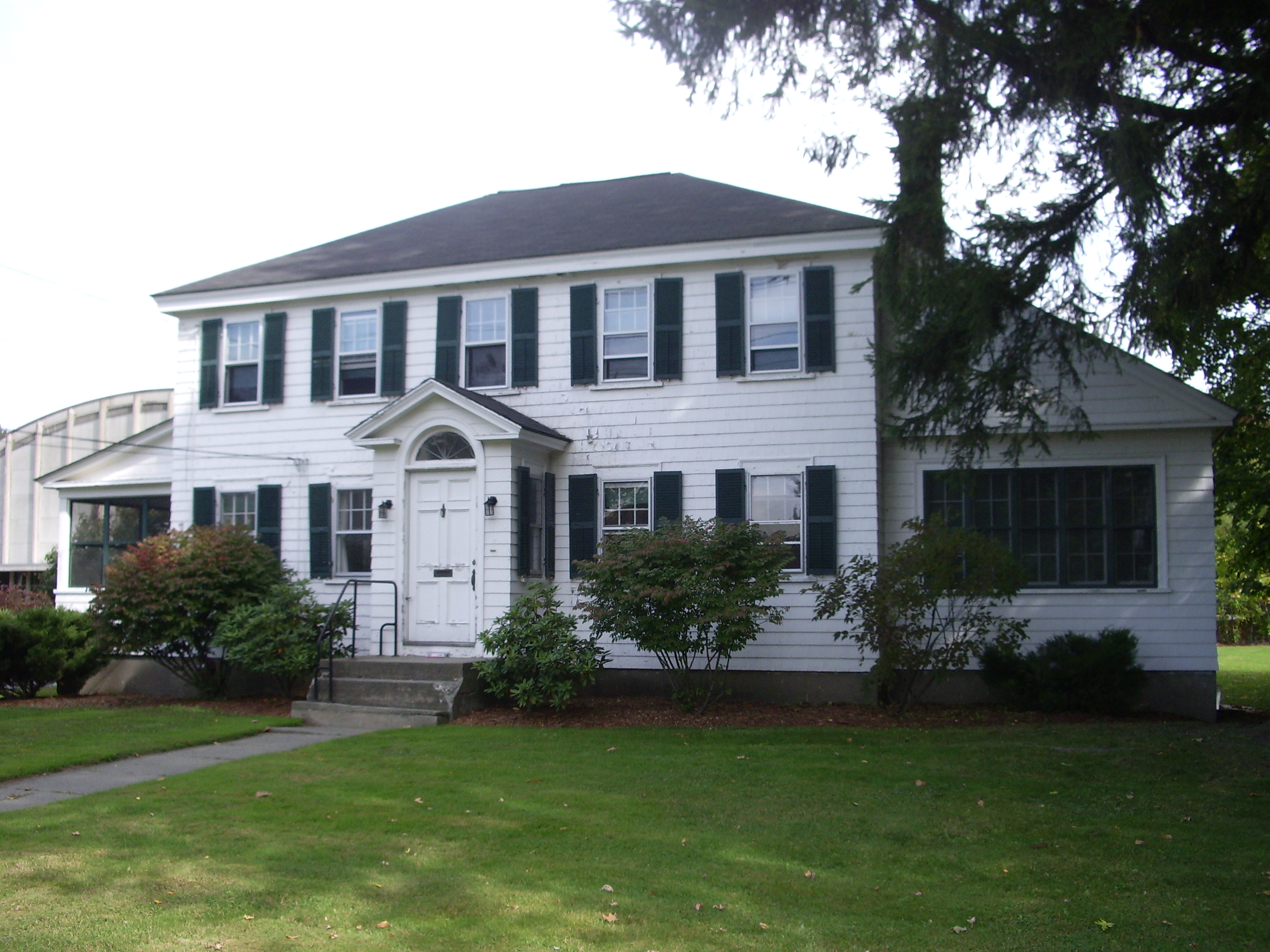
Fire and Skoal House, 2007

== House ==
The society moved to a house at 29 South Park Street in the fall of 1978. The house built between 1893 and 1896. It was the residence of C. H. Richardson and Edwin Case in 1896. W. H. Moore was its owner by 1931, followed by Dartmouth College in 1978.

== Membership ==
Fire and Skoal membership is co-ed, secret, and exclusive. It has around thirty active members who are seniors. Active members select the next year's members during their junior year in a college-wide selection process known as tapping. Every winter and spring, juniors are tapped for the senior societies through a process semi-coordinated through the college. Members carry identifying canes or walking sticks at commencement.

== Notable members ==
- Kirsten Gillibrand, New York Senator and 2020 Presidential Candidate
- Tara S. Holm, mathematician and professor at Cornell University
- Bob Kempainen, Olympic long distance runner
- David M. Shribman, Pulitzer Prize winning journalist

== See also ==
- Dartmouth College student groups
- Collegiate secret societies in North America
