= Dragon Society (Dartmouth College) =

Secret society at Dartmouth College, US

- Founded: 1898; 128 years ago Dartmouth College
- Type: Secret
- Affiliation: Independent
- Status: Active
- Emphasis: Senior men
- Scope: Local
- Chapters: 1
- Headquarters: PO Box 801; Hanover, New Hampshire 03755; United States

The Dragon Society or Society of Dragons is a secret society of senior men at Dartmouth College in Hanover, New Hampshire, United States. The group's membership and organizational structure are unknown, with notable exceptions. Dragon has been in continuous operation since its founding in 1898.

== History ==
The Dragon Society or Society of Dragons was established as a senior men's secret society at Dartmouth College. Because it is a secret society, little verifiable information is available about its activities or membership. The Dartmouth Dragon Foundation is the business name of Dragon. The foundation is a registered non-profit corporation to hold Dragon's assets, including its endowment, and serves as the society's alumni board. Dragon's assets total $1.3 million as of 2025.

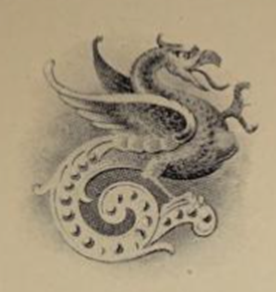
Dragon Society logo, 1926

== Membership ==
Membership consists of a small number of senior men who are selected during their junior year in a school-wide selection process known as "tapping." Every winter and spring, juniors are tapped for the senior societies through a process semi-coordinated through the College. Members are thought to be leaders of Dartmouth's athletic teams and fraternities. Taps are voted on by the membership.

Members do not carry identifying canes at commencement, nor do they identify themselves in Dartmouth's yearbook, The Aegis. Members of Dartmouth's other secret societies identify themselves in either or both ways. As a result, the society is often considered the most secretive organization at Dartmouth.

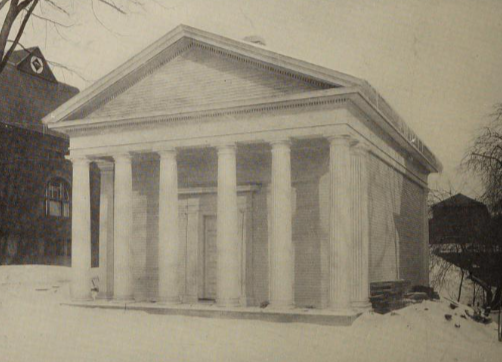
Dragon Society Hall, Dartmouth College, 1926

== Notable members ==
Despite the secrecy that surrounds the society, the Dartmouth Board of Trustees website lists trustee Jeff Immelt, the former CEO of General Electric, as a member of the Dragon Society.

== See also ==
- Dartmouth College student groups
- Collegiate secret societies in North America
