= Samuel F. McCleary Jr. =

Civil Servant and Lawyer

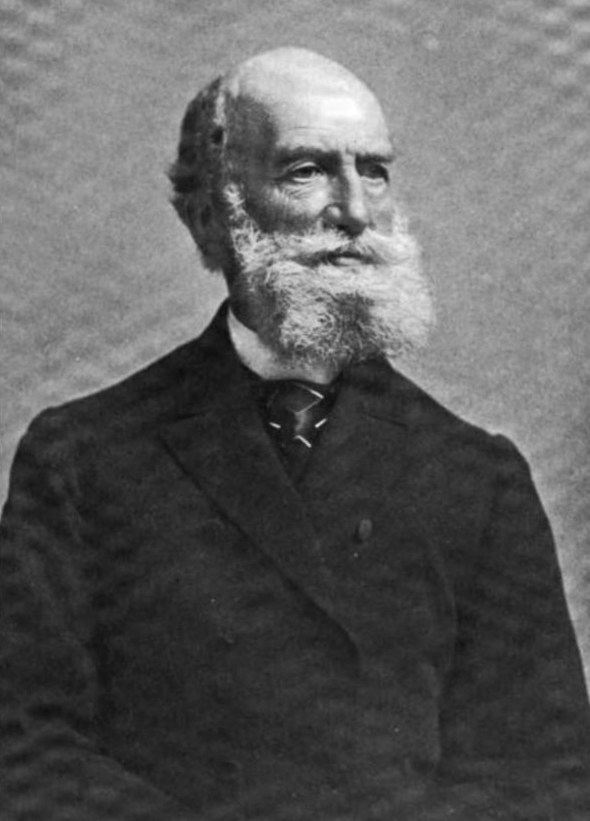

Boston City Clerk
- In office 1853–1883
- Preceded by: Samuel F. McCleary
- Succeeded by: Frederick E. Goodrich

Personal details
- Born: July 14, 1822 Boston, Massachusetts
- Died: April 25, 1901 (aged 78) Brookline, Massachusetts
- Spouse: Emily Thurston Barnard (m. 1855; died 1871)
- Education: Harvard College; Harvard Law School
- Profession: Lawyer
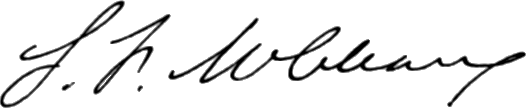
- Signature

Samuel Foster McCleary Jr. (July 14, 1822 – April 25, 1901) was an American lawyer and government official who served as Boston's city clerk for 30 years. He succeeded his father, Samuel F. McCleary, who held it for the previous 30.

== Early life ==
McCleary was born on July 14, 1822, in Boston. He attended Boston Public Schools and received the Franklin Medal at Boston Latin School. He graduated from Harvard College in 1841 and Harvard Law School in 1843.

== Career ==
McCleary completed his studies in the law office of John Albion Andrew and was admitted to the Suffolk County bar on October 9, 1844. He dedicated much of his time assisting his father in his official duties and essentially ran the city clerk's office during the elder McCleary's final years in office. In 1852 succeeded his father as Boston city clerk. McCleary was never a member of any political party and was removed from office in 1883 when the Democrats came to power and chose to put one of their own in office.

After leaving the city clerk's office, McCleary spent five years managing the Boston office of the Equitable Life Insurance Company. He spent his later years managing various trusts.

== Personal life ==
McClearly was married to Emily Thurston Barnard from 1855 until her death in 1871. They had four daughters and one son. Their son, also named Samuel F. McCleary, graduated from the Harvard Divinity School in 1892 and was the assistant pastor at the First Unitarian Congregational Church of Brooklyn until his suicide on December 2, 1892.

McClearly was a member of the Church of the Disciples and was a friend of its founder James Freeman Clarke. He lived in Brookline, Massachusetts during his retirement and died there on April 25, 1901.
