= The Big Green Bus =

The Big Green Bus (BGB) is a project run by Dartmouth College students, for the purpose of promoting sustainability and renewable energy sources. Founded in 2005, the project successfully converted a used school bus to run on vegetable oil waste. In 2009 the project was able to upgrade, converting an MCI coach bus to run on VWO.

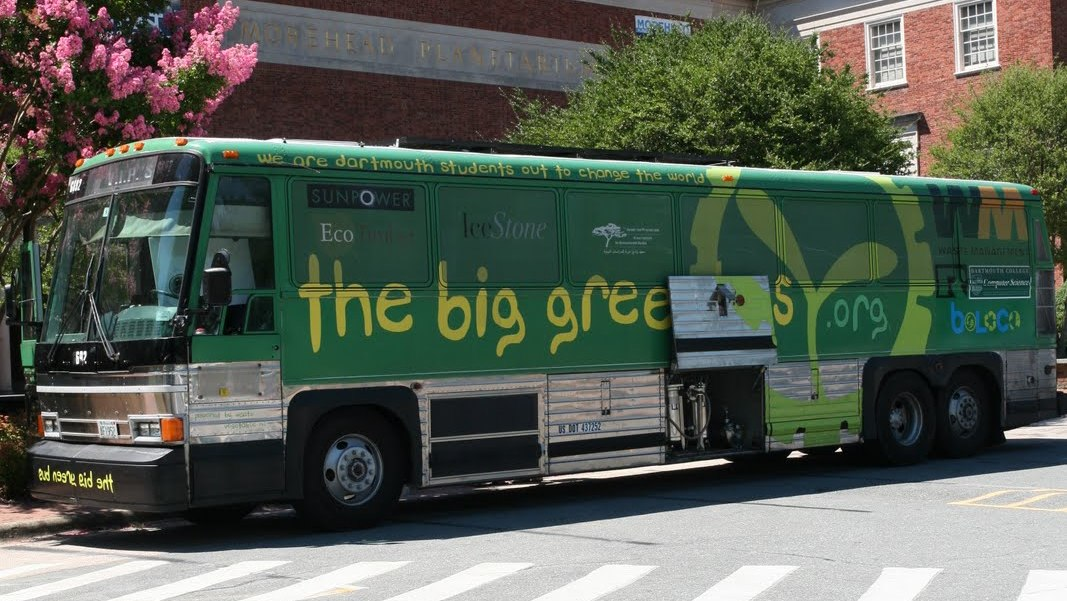
The Big Green Bus in Chapel Hill, NC, July 2010.

The BGB is part of the Dartmouth Outing Club and is entirely student-run. In addition to participating in various public events, the BGB brings their educational presentations to schools, camps and other gatherings , where participants are educated on managing environmental projects. The BGB's website provides additional educational resources and tips.

BGB is fueled by vegetable oil waste (VOW), and can travel approximately 1,500 miles on a full 300 gallon tank. The VOW is collected from participating restaurants and is, whenever possible, obtained during stops at participating vendors en route to BGB's various destinations.

Other environmentally friendly features include bamboo floors, recycled glass countertops, and solar panels which provide the energy needed to operate lighting. The goal of the interior design is a sustainable yet comfortable living space.

In 2009, fifteen students participated in a ten-week Big Green Bus Tour, which made stops in multiple cities across America, promoting environmental awareness.

The current status of the BGB's functionality is not known.
