= Dartmouth Law Journal =

- Discipline: Law
- Language: English
- Edited by: Zoe Olson, Dylan Parikh, Jackson Weinstein, Faculty Advisor: Sonu Bedi

Publication details
- Former name: Dartmouth College Undergraduate Journal of Law (2003-2005 OCLC 61238869)
- History: 2003-present
- Publisher: Nelson A. Rockefeller Center for the Social Sciences (United States)
- Frequency: Biannual
- Open access: Gold
- License: Subscription: $32.00 per year.

Standard abbreviations
- Bluebook: Dartmouth L.J.
- ISO 4: Dartm. Law J.

Indexing
- ISSN: 2643-1149
- OCLC no.: 122345200

Links
- Journal homepage

The Dartmouth Law Journal, formerly the Dartmouth College Undergraduate Journal of Law, is a student-run legal journal founded in 2003. The print journal accepts articles from lawyers, law students, judges and legal academics, and is one of the nation's first law journals run entirely by undergraduates. It is edited and published by the students of Dartmouth College in Hanover, New Hampshire. The Journal also publishes work by undergraduates on their online platform, DLJ Online.
