= Ludden =

Ludden may refer to:

- Ludden, North Dakota, United States

== People with the surname ==
- Allen Ludden (1917–1981), American game-show host
- Brad Ludden (born 1981), American professional kayaker
- Raymond P. Ludden (1909–1979), American Department of State official
