= Peter Olsson =

Peter Olsson may refer to:

- Peter A. Olsson (born 1941), American psychiatrist and psychoanalyst
- Peter Olsson (motorsports driver) (born 1971), former professional racing driver
- Peter Olsson (bassist) (born 1961), Swedish rock musician
- Peter Olsson (alpine skier) (born 1979), Swedish alpine skier

== See also ==
- Pete Olson (born 1962), U.S. Representative
- Peter B. Olsen (1848–1926), American newspaper editor
- Richard Olsen (Peter Richard Olsen, 1911–1956), Danish Olympic rower
