= National Institute of Public Health of Kosovo =

Research institute, national public health institute of Kosovo

National Institute of public Health of Kosova Instituti Kombëtar i Shëndetësisë Publike të Kosovës
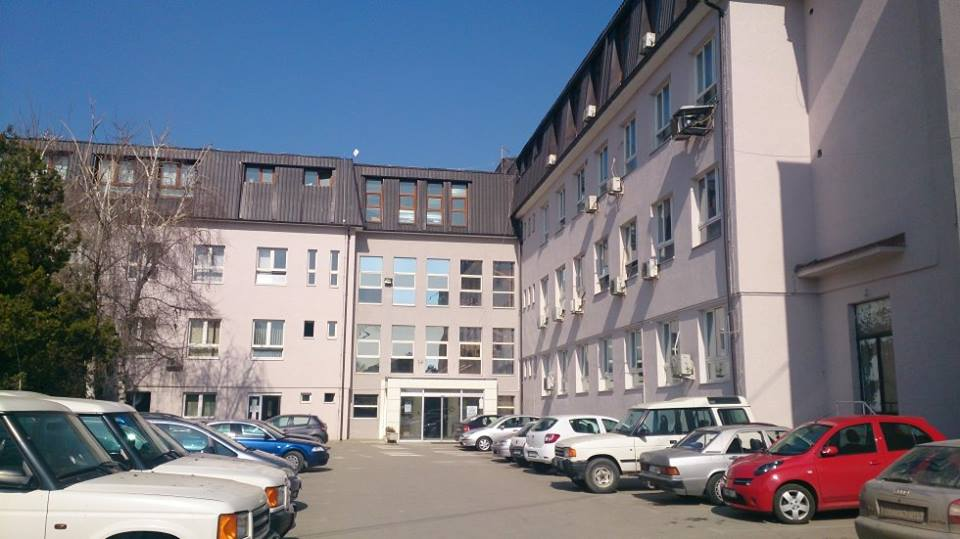
- Motto: Healthy population in a healthy environment and state (Popullatë e shëndoshë në një mjedis dhe shtet të shëndoshë)
- Established: 5 June 1925; 100 years ago (MCMXXV)
- Address: Rr. Nënë Tereza, p.n. (Rrethi i Spitalit)
- Location: Pristina, Kosovo
- Website: http://niph-rks.org/

The National Institute of Public Health of Kosova (NIPHK) is the oldest and highest health, professional and scientific institution of Kosovo, which organizes, develops, supervises and implements public health policies in Kosovo. The NIPHK covers the entire territory of the Republic of Kosovo through its branches - Public Health Institutes (IPH) organized in these Regional Centers: Peja, Prizren, Mitrovica, Gjilan, Gjakova, Ferizaj.

== History ==
The 1920s were characterized by very bad medical conditions in the Balkans. In general, based on the Kosovar health care condition and the overall public health situation, a decision was made to establish hygiene and epidemiological services in the city of Peja with the "Rockfeler" fund support from the U.S and on 5 June 1925 this service finally began to work. On the same day, basis were set for Preventive Medicine in Kosovo and 5 June is marked as a festive day for founding of the Institute of Public Health. After that date, sanitary stations, hygienic and microbiological or epidemiological services were established in Pristina, Prizren and Mitrovica. In these units there was a great lack of specialized staff (except in Prizren), but health services were performed by health employees with medical school degrees. In Prizren during 1923/1924, it was established the highly efficient bacteriological service which provided services to the entire territory of Kosovo, during Kingdom of Serbs, Croats and Slovenes era. Yet, being the only bacteriological service which later developed into the hygienic-sanitary services in order to be later transformed into the Regional Institute of Public Health of Prizren. During the years 1946/1947, the first Albanian doctor Dr. Durmish Celina started his work by developing educational-medical activities. At that time, Dr. Daut Mustafa lectured professional courses in the medical high school too.

The Inheritance of many infectious diseases had damaged the country in terms of economy, culture, education, and health. Prior to World War II and especially after it ended, the health condition and the circumstances in Kosovo were extremely difficult. There were many serious infectious diseases such as: malaria, typhus, louse, tuberculosis, measles, meningitis, diphtheria, and other diseases which led to killing hundreds to thousands infants. It is important to emphasize the fact that in Kosovo in 1940 there were 5 hospitals with 390 beds, 36 different ambulatory medical and preventive services that had 5 sanitary-epidemiological stations, from which only three had worked. Dr. Isuf Dedushaj stated that in all these medical institutions there were 38 doctors, 20 private pharmacists, one dentist, and around 85 medical workers that have learned from medical practice and courses offered at that time. After World War II, Kosovo had terrible living conditions and the illiteracy rate was about 98%.

In the early 1946, Socialist Autonomous Province of Kosovo had five hospitals with 333 beds, on average 0.4 beds per 1,000 inhabitants, 9 doctors (foreign and local), 15 pharmacists, 6 medical technicians, 11 cleaners, and 27 other medical workers with lower qualification. The medical protection was offered in 8 cities, 3 villages, and 1 anti-tuberculosis dispensary, whereas in the dental prevention program there were 4 dentists.

NIPHK is the foundation of the Faculty of Medicine. Organizes and supervises basic studies and assesses the scientific and professional training of candidates in the field of public health.

== Nowadays ==
Today, the institution organizes and applies the strategy of public health hygienic-sanitary measures, prophylactic-epidemically measures, social-medical, health education, EPI (expanded program on immunization), health promotion, water, food and air quality controls, health policy, economy of health, and develops scientific research works in the territory of the Republic of Kosovo. Hence, the Institute is known as the educational base of the Faculty of Medicine and is divided in five departments: Epidemiology, Human Ecology, Social Medicine, Micro-biology and Health Information System; Kosovo School of Public Health.

It is a Health Institution that plans, programs and evaluates health policies, prepares and implements the public health strategy (hygienic - sanitary measures, prophylaxis - anti - pediatric measures, medical social, health promotion, education and health education, water quality control and food, expandedin immunization program, health policy and health economics, health information) throughout Kosovo. The Institute develops research-scientific work and organizes the professional perfection of health workers.

== See also ==
- Healthcare in Kosovo
- University Clinical Center of Kosovo
