= Dr. Glaucomflecken =

American ophthalmologist and comedian

- Born: William E. Flanary; October 2, 1985 (age 41)
- Education: Texas Tech University; Geisel School of Medicine at Dartmouth

Comedy career
- Medium: Social media
- Genres: observational comedy; surreal humor; deadpan
- Subject: Medicine
- Medical career
- Profession: Physician
- Field: Ophthalmology
- Institutions: EyeHealth Northwest

YouTube information
- Channel: Dr. Glaucomflecken
- Years active: 2020–present
- Subscribers: 1.22 million
- Views: 596 million
- Last updated: 18 April 2025
- Website: glaucomflecken.com

William E. Flanary is an American comedian, podcaster and ophthalmologist who performs under the stage name Dr. Glaucomflecken. He practices in Clackamas County, Oregon. Since 2016 he has become well known for making and uploading medical satire skits on Twitter, TikTok and YouTube. Since 2022, he has hosted a podcast called Knock Knock, Hi! with the Glaucomfleckens with his wife Kristin Flanary, also known as Lady Glaucomflecken.

== Biography ==
Flanary grew up in Houston, Texas. He was educated at Texas Tech University, where he graduated Phi Beta Kappa and summa cum laude with a bachelor's degree in cell and molecular biology. While attending Texas Tech, he met his wife, Kristin. He then enrolled at the Geisel School of Medicine at Dartmouth College, where he discovered his interest in ophthalmology. While attending Dartmouth, he was inducted into Alpha Omega Alpha.

It was also while he was a medical student at Dartmouth that he was first diagnosed with testicular cancer (specifically, a highly curable stage 1a seminoma) at the age of 25. He then had surgery to remove the testicle that had the tumor on it. After graduating from Dartmouth, he completed his residency at the University of Iowa Department of Ophthalmology and Visual Sciences in 2017.

During his third year of residency, Flanary was diagnosed with testicular cancer again. This time the diagnosis was a stage 1b seminoma, and he had surgery to remove his remaining testicle, followed by androgen replacement therapy consisting of a weekly self-administered injection of testosterone. (He has joked, "It's so easy even an ophthalmologist can do it.") By this point, he and his wife had two children.

In May 2020, Flanary suddenly went into cardiac arrest in his sleep. His wife performed CPR on him for 10 minutes before paramedics arrived and resuscitated him. He told CTV News in January 2022 that he still did not know the reason that he went into cardiac arrest.

== Work with First Descents ==
Since 2017, Flanary has raised money for the non-profit organization First Descents, which provides outdoor experiences to young adults who have been diagnosed with cancer. He had raised over US$100,000 for the organization as of January 2022. He has described his own experiences using the organization after being diagnosed with cancer as "a lifeline".

== Dr. Glaucomflecken ==
Flanary created the Dr. Glaucomflecken Twitter account in 2016 out of boredom at a research conference. The account is named after glaukomflecken, a sign of acute angle-closure glaucoma. As of June 2022, his Twitter account had over 573,000 followers, and his TikTok account had over 1.5 million followers and over 58 million total likes. At the time, Flanary told CTV News, "If I’d known that it would turn into this I would have chosen an easier name to say. Honestly, it's surreal." His videos frequently satirize tropes or stereotypes found among different medical specialties. Flanary's videos have amassed popularity in the medical community.

He has received many speaking opportunities since revealing himself as the creator of Dr. Glaucomflecken, including as the commencement speaker for the graduating class of Yale School of Medicine, University of Colorado Anschutz Medical Campus in May 2022 and University of Michigan Medicine in May 2024 .

According to Robert D. Putnam and Céline Gounder, comedians like Flanary are "leveraging irony and exaggeration to expose the ills of the American healthcare system and the lunacy of global COVID vaccine inequity."
