= Colchero =

Colchero is a surname. Notable people with the surname include:

- Ana Colchero (born 1968), Mexican actress and economist
- Arantxa Colchero, Mexican economist
