= Ira Byock =

American physician and author

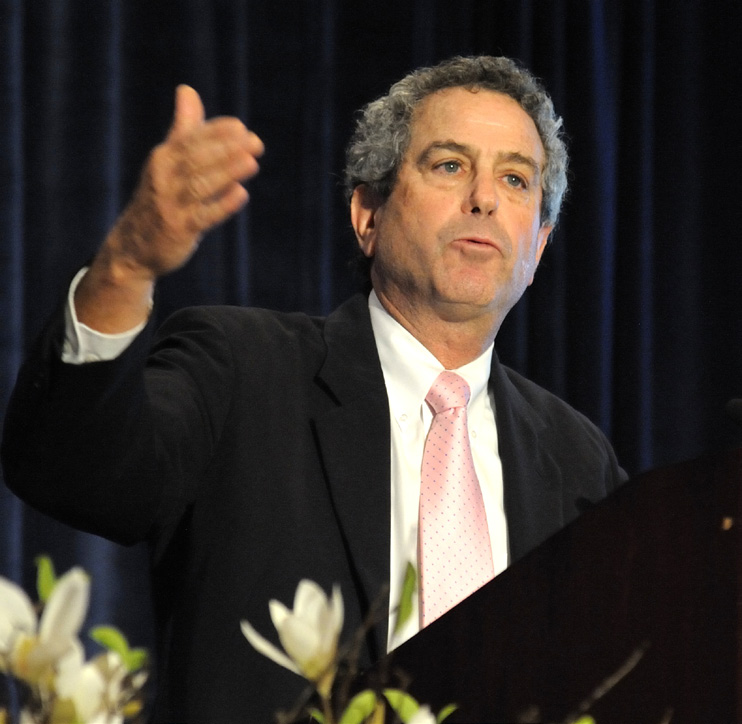
- Born: February 13, 1951; Newark, New Jersey, United States
- Occupations: Physician, author
- Known for: Advocate for palliative care
- Website: irabyock.org

Ira Robert Byock (/ˈbaɪɒk/ BYE-ok; born February 13, 1951) is an American physician, author, and palliative care advocate. He is the founder and served from 2014 to 2022 as chief medical officer of the Institute for Human Caring of the Providence St. Joseph Health system, which is based in Renton, Washington. Byock holds appointments as an active emeritus professor of medicine and an emeritus professor of community health and family medicine at the Geisel School of Medicine at Dartmouth College. He served as the director of palliative medicine at Dartmouth–Hitchcock Medical Center from 2003 to 2013.

Byock focused his early medical career on emergency medicine and rural practice (1981–1994). He shifted into hospice care and directed the Robert Wood Johnson Foundation's Promoting Excellence in End-of-Life Care initiative (1996–2006). His published books include Dying Well (1997), The Four Things That Matter Most (2004), and The Best Care Possible (2012). Since 2022, he has published multiple essays and white papers critiquing systemic failures within the modern hospice industry.

== Education and medical training ==
Byock earned a bachelor's degree in biology from the University of Colorado Boulder in 1973. He received his Doctor of Medicine from the University of Colorado School of Medicine in 1978. He completed an internship and residency in family practice medicine at the University of California, San Francisco program in Fresno, California, from 1978 to 1981.

Byock obtained certification from the American Board of Family Medicine in 1981 and the American Board of Hospice and Palliative Medicine in 1996. He held certification from the American Board of Emergency Medicine from 1989 to 1998. He is a Fellow of the American Academy of Hospice and Palliative Medicine (AAHPM).

== Career and professional focus ==
Byock worked as an emergency physician in rural Montana clinics from 1982 to 1996. During this time, he collaborated with Melanie Merriman to develop the Missoula-VITAS Quality of Life Index. The clinical assessment tool measures the subjective quality of life and well-being of patients experiencing serious illness, independent of their physical symptom burden. The index received positive ratings for validity and cross-cultural application. It is utilized primarily in clinical applications to track therapeutic progress rather than strictly as a psychometric research tool.

The Robert Wood Johnson Foundation appointed Byock in 1996 to lead its Promoting Excellence in End-of-Life Care national program. The initiative distributed $15 million across 26 demonstration projects over ten years to test palliative care models in underserved populations. He also served as the principal investigator for the Missoula Demonstration Project, which studied illness and grieving within a specific community context.

Byock served as president of the AAHPM in 1997. From 1998 to 2002, he was a founding member and executive committee member for the Partnership for Caring, which later became the Last Acts Partnership. He moved to New Hampshire in 2003 to direct palliative medicine for Dartmouth–Hitchcock Medical Center. He founded the Institute for Human Caring at Providence Health & Services in Torrance, California, in 2014, taking the role of chief medical officer.

== Human development during illness and dying ==
In his writings and academic research, Byock elaborated a framework for human development through the end of life. He developed counseling tools for life completion. He created the Missoula-VITAS Quality of Life Index, a human development-based survey of suffering and wellbeing during serious illness. He also built a model describing stages of adjustment as death approaches, from developing wellbeing in the final phase of life to reconciling relationships and life events near the end.

== Advocacy and institutional leadership ==
At the Institute for Human Caring, Byock established care standards emphasizing advance directives, routine well-being assessments, and goals-aligned medical plans for patients with serious illnesses. He served as an original advisor to The Conversation Project. This national initiative, organized by the Institute for Healthcare Improvement, encourages families to document their end-of-life care preferences.

=== Hospice reform advocacy ===
Byock advocates for structural reforms within the U.S. hospice industry. He published the essay "Hospice Care Needs Saving" in STAT News in December 2022. The piece responded directly to an investigation by ProPublica and The New Yorker into for-profit hospice operations. He argued for strict transparency, enhanced government oversight, and legal accountability to force self-correction within the industry.

In June 2025, Byock published the white paper A Strategic Path Forward for Hospice and Palliative Care in Palliative Medicine Reports. The document detailed a four-component plan to publish clear clinical standards, release provider data to the public, promote quality-based competition, and refocus the field on alleviating suffering and improving wellbeing.

Byock also argues for the application of legal right-to-try provisions to allow terminally ill patients supervised access to psychedelic-assisted therapies. He supports utilizing psychedelic medications like psilocybin and MDMA to treat demoralization syndrome and depression in terminal patients. He presents this approach as a method to rewrite the brain's default mode network and reduce end-of-life anxiety.

== Opposition to physician-assisted suicide ==
Byock opposes legalizing physician-assisted suicide and the broader right to die movement. He has publicly criticized the Oregon Death with Dignity Act and the California End of Life Option Act, arguing that such legislation distracts from improving access to comprehensive palliative care.

== Media appearances ==
Byock has appeared as a featured guest on national television and radio programs to discuss end-of-life care. His radio appearances include NPR's Talk of the Nation, All Things Considered, Fresh Air, and American Public Media's On Being. On television, he has been interviewed for CBS's 60 Minutes, ABC News Nightline, and PBS NewsHour.

== Personal life ==
Byock is married to Yvonne Corbeil, a nurse who served as a senior advisor and clinical transformation specialist for the Institute for Human Caring.

== Awards and honors ==
In 2014, Byock received the Lifetime Achievement Award from the American Academy of Hospice and Palliative Medicine. The New Hampshire Hospice and Palliative Care Organization established the Ira Byock and Yvonne Corbeil Award in 2013. The annual award recognizes individual clinicians and teams who improve palliative care access and quality within the state. He won the Annual Books for a Better Life Award in the Wellness category in 2012 for The Best Care Possible.

== Publications and reception ==
Byock has written three books on palliative care. His first book, Dying Well, was published in 1997 and became a standard in the field. His 2004 book, The Four Things That Matter Most, is utilized as a counseling framework in clinical hospice programs and pastoral care settings. In 2012, he published The Best Care Possible: A Physician's Quest to Transform Care Through the End of Life. The book criticizes the American healthcare system for prioritizing aggressive disease treatment over patient comfort during the final stages of life.

- The Best Care Possible: A Physician's Quest to Transform Care Through the End of Life. New York: Avery, 2012. ISBN 978-1-58333-459-1
- Dying Well: The Prospect for Growth at the End of Life. New York: Riverhead Books, 1997. ISBN 978-1-57322-657-8
- The Four Things That Matter Most: A Book About Living (2nd ed.). New York: Atria Books, 2014. ISBN 978-1-4767-4853-5
- Heffner J. & Byock I. (eds). Palliative and End of Life Pearls. Philadelphia, PA: Hanley & Belfus, 2002. ISBN 978-1-56053-500-3
- Staton J, Shuy R, Byock I. A Few Months to Live: Different Paths to Life's End. Washington, DC: Georgetown University Press, 2001. ISBN 978-0-87840-841-2
