= Robert E. Michler =

American heart surgeon

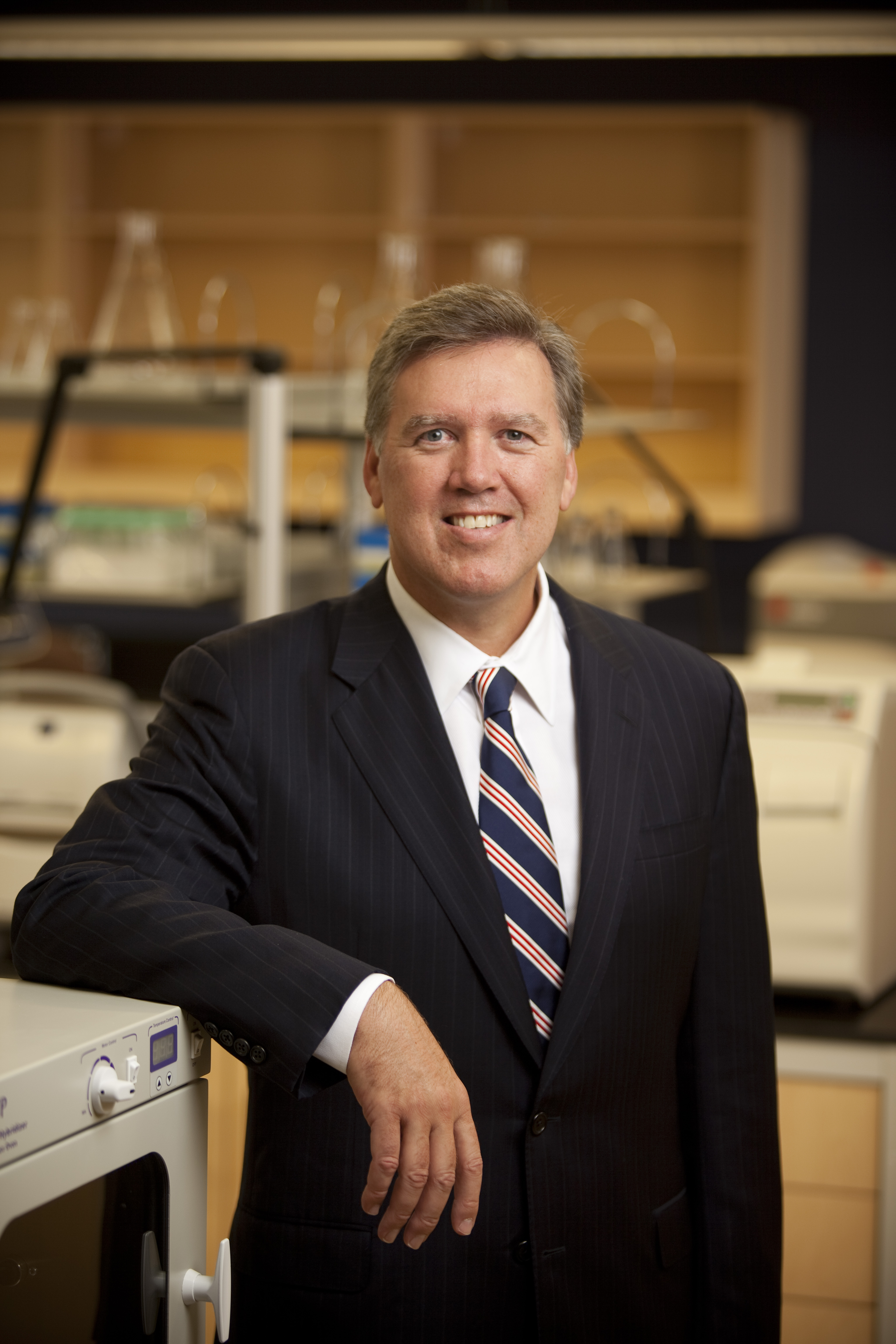
- Citizenship: American
- Education: Harvard University; Dartmouth Medical School
- Known for: Cardiothoracic surgeon, author, lecturer
- Awards: Vladimir Borakovsky Prize from the Ministry of Health of the Russian Federation 2017.; ABC World News Person of the Week - With Peter Jennings Tonight February 18, 1995.; La Orden Heraldica de Cristobal Colon Dominican Republic (The Order of Christopher Columbus) Awarded by President Hipolito Mejiaof the Dominican Republic for Heart Care International's humanitarian heart surgery missions) March 17, 2003; Erasmus Foundation Honorary President, Brussels, June 7, 2000; Columbia University Claire Lucille Pace Humanitarian Award College of Physicians and Surgeons May 13, 1996.; Best Doctors in America 1995–present; Best Doctors in New York 1995–present; Columbia University Blakemore Research Prize, College of Physicians and Surgeons 1985; 1986; 1987

Robert E. Michler is an American heart surgeon known for his expertise in aortic and mitral valve repair, coronary artery bypass surgery, aneurysm surgery, and heart failure management. In 2017, he was awarded the Vladimir Borakovsky Prize by the Ministry of Health of the Russian Federation for his contributions to cardiovascular surgery.

Michler serves as the Surgeon-in-Chief at Montefiore Medical Center and Albert Einstein College of Medicine in New York City. He holds the Samuel I. Belkin Endowed Chair and is a Professor and Chairman of both the Department of Cardiothoracic & Vascular Surgery and the Department of Surgery. He is also Co-Director of the Montefiore Einstein Center for Heart and Vascular Care.

== Education and training ==
Michler graduated magna cum laude from Harvard University. He received his medical degree from Dartmouth Medical School, where he was a Leopold Schepp Scholar. Michler completed his residency in general surgery, a fellowship in Cardiothoracic Transplantation, and a fellowship in cardiothoracic surgery at the Columbia Presbyterian Medical Center in New York. He was awarded the Blakemore Research Prize in 1987. He completed a fellowship in Pediatric Cardiothoracic Surgery at Boston Children’s Hospital, Harvard Medical School.

== Career ==
Michler began his career on the faculty of Columbia Presbyterian Medical Center/Columbia University in New York City. He became the director of the Heart Transplantation Program before being recruited to The Ohio State University as the head of the cardio-thoracic surgery division and director of the Heart & Lung Transplantation Program. In 2005, Michler returned to New York City as Chairman of the Department of Cardiothoracic Surgery and was soon after appointed Surgeon-in-Chief of the healthcare system as well as Chairman of the Department of Surgery.

Michler’s research interests include repairing the injured heart, leading to clinical trials on autologous skeletal myoblast and cardiac stem cell transplantation. He is an NIH-funded investigator and has been involved in clinical trial enrollment. Michler and his teams have worked to advance minimally invasive cardiothoracic surgery procedures and surgical robotics. This work led to Food and Drug Administration approval for selective cardiac robotic procedures, including mitral valve repair and coronary bypass surgery.

Michler has authored over 300 peer-reviewed publications, including publications in the New England Journal of Medicine, Circulation, and the Journal of Thoracic and Cardiovascular Surgery. He is an editor and is quoted on the subject of heart disease in the media.

Michler is the chairman and founder of Heart Care International, a not-for-profit foundation which performs pediatric heart surgery in under-served regions. Since 1994, Heart Care International has served over 1,500 children with heart disease and performed heart surgery on over 1,000 children. He has received numerous honors, including being named “Person of the Week” by Peter Jennings of ABC World News Tonight, the Pace Humanitarian Award, and “The Order of Christopher Columbus” by Hipolito Mejia, President of the Dominican Republic.

== Patents ==
- Endovascular Flexible Stapling Device, Robert E. Michler & Sunuchi Homma, U.S. Patent No. 6,482,224, Issued: November 19, 2002
- Vascular and Intestinal Occlusion, Albert N. Santilli & Robert E. Michler, U.S. Patent No. 9,480,480, Issued: November 1, 2016
- Exclusion of the Left Atrial Appendage, Robert E. Michler & Albert N. Santilli, U.S. Patent No. 9,486,225, Issued: November 8, 2016
- Single-Arm Stabilizer Having Suction Capability, Robert E. Michler & Albert N. Santilli, U.S. Patent No. 9,603,590, Issued: March 28, 2017
- Left Ventricular Vent, Robert E. Michler et al., U.S. Patent (Pending)

== Honors ==
- Vladimir Borakovsky Prize from the Ministry of Health of the Russian Federation 2017
- ABC World News Person of the Week - With Peter Jennings Tonight February 18, 1995
- La Orden Heraldica de Cristobal Colon Dominican Republic (The Order of Christopher Columbus) Awarded by President Hipolito Mejiaof the Dominican Republic for Heart Care International's humanitarian heart surgery missions) March 17, 2003
- Erasmus Foundation Honorary President, Brussels, June 7, 2000
- Columbia University Claire Lucille Pace Humanitarian Award College of Physicians and Surgeons May 13, 1996
- Best Doctors in America 1995–present
- Best Doctors in New York 1995–present
- Columbia University Blakemore Research Prize, College of Physicians and Surgeons 1985; 1986; 1987

== Selected publications ==
- Michler RE, Smith PK, Parides MK, Ailawadi G, Thourani V, Moskowitz AJ, Acker MA, Hung JW, Chang HL, Perrault LP, Gillinov M, Argenziano M, Bagiella E, Overbey JR, Moquete EG, Gupta LN, Miller MA, Taddei-Peters WC, Jeffries N, Weisel RD, Rose EA, Gammie JS, DeRose JJ, Puskas JD, Dagenais F, Burks SG, Hamamsy IE, Milano CA, Atluri P, Voisine P, O’Gara PT, Gelijns AC. Two Year Outcomes following Surgical Treatment of Moderate Ischemic Mitral Regurgitation. N Engl J Med. 2016; 374:1932-1941.
- Velazquez, EJ, Lee KL, Jones RH, Al-Khalidi HR, Hill JA, Panza JA, Michler RE, Bonow RO, Doesn't T, Petrie MC, Oh JK, She L, Moore V, Desvigne Nickens P, Sopko G, Rouleau JL. Ten-Year Outcome of Coronary Artery Bypass Graft Surgery versus Medical Therapy in Patients with Ischemic Cardiomyopathy: Results of the Surgical Treatment for Ischemic Heart Failure Extension Study. N Engl J Med. 2016; 374:1511-1520.
- Goldstein D, Moskowitz AJ, Geijins AC, Ailawadi G, Parides MK, Perrault LP, Hung JW, Voisine P, Dagenais F, Gillinov M, Thourani V, Argenziano M, Gammie JS, Mack M, Demers P, Atluri P, Rose EA, O’Sullivan K, Williams DL, Bagelia E, Michler RE, Weisel RD, Miller MA, Geller NL, Taddei-Peters WC, Smith PK, Moquete E, Overbey JR, Kron IL, O’Gara PT, Acker MA. Two Year Outcomes of Surgical Treatment in Severe Ischemic Mitral Regurgitation. N Engl J Med. 2016; 374:344-353.
- Acker MA, Parides MK, Perrault LP, Moskowitz AJ, Gelijns AC, Voisine P, Smith PK, Hung JW, Blackstone EH, Puskas JD, Argenziano M, Gammie JS, Mack M, Ascheim DD, Bagiella E, Moquete EG, Ferguson TB, Horvath KA, Geller NL, Miller MA, Woo YJ, D'Alessandro DA, Ailawadi G, Dagenais F, Gardner TJ, O'Gara PT, Michler RE, Kron IL; the CTSN Mitral-Valve Repair versus Replacement for Severe Ischemic Mitral Regurgitation. N Engl J Med. 2014; 370:23-32.
- Jones RH, Velazquez EJ, Michler RE, Sopko G, Oh JK, O'Connor CM, Hill JA, Menicanti L, Sadowski Z, Desvigne-Nickens P, Rouleau JL, Lee KL; the STICH Hypothesis 2 Investigators.Coronary Bypass Surgery with or without Surgical Ventricular Reconstruction. N Engl J Med. 2009; 360:1705-17.
- Michler RE, Rouleau JL, Al-Khalidi HR, Bonow RO, Pellikka PA, Pohost GM, Holly TA, Oh JK, Dagenais F, Milano C, Wrobel K, Pirk J, Ali IS, Velazquez EJ, Lee KL, Di Donato M. Insights from the STICH trial: Change in left ventricular size after coronary artery bypass grafting with and without surgical ventricular reconstruction. J Thorac Cardiovasc Surg. 2013; 146:1139-1145.
- Michler RE, Surgical Management of Moderate Ischemic Mitral Regurgitation at the Time of Coronary Artery Bypass Grafting Remains Controversial. J Thoracic Cardiovasc Surg. 2018; 156:1498-1500
- Michler RE. Surgical Options for the Management of Ischemic Cardiomyopathy. Current Treatment Options in Cardiovascular Medicine. 2013; 15:518-532.
- Williams JB, Peterson ED, Brennan JM, Sedrakyan A, Tavris D, Alexander JH, Lopes RD, Dokholyan RS, Zhao Y, O’Brien SM, Michler RE, Thourani VH, Edwards FH, Gross T, Marinac-Dabic D, Smith PK. Endoscopic Association between endoscopic vs open vein-graft harvesting and mortality, wound complications, and cardiovascular events in patients undergoing CABG surgery. JAMA. 2012; 308:475-84.
- Smith PK, Michler RE, Woo YJ, Alexander JH, Puskas JD, Parides MK, Hahn RT, Williams JB, Dent JM, Ferguson TB Jr, Moquete E, Rose EA, Pagé P, Jeffries NO, O'Gara PT, Ascheim DD. Design, rationale, and initiation of the Surgical Interventions for Moderate Ischemic Mitral Regurgitation Trial: A report from the Cardiothoracic Surgical Trials Network. J Thorac Cardiovasc Surg. 2012; 143:111-117.
