= Lifelines (journal) =

Literary journal

- Discipline: Literary journal
- Language: English
- Edited by: Colin McLeish, Diana Lee, Renisa Ramnath

Publication details
- History: 2004–present
- Publisher: Geisel School of Medicine at Dartmouth (USA)
- Frequency: Annual

Standard abbreviations
- ISO 4: Lifelines

Indexing
- ISSN: 2373-5163
- LCCN: 2014202955
- OCLC no.: 57178237

Links
- Journal homepage; Online access

Lifelines is an annual literary journal published by the Geisel School of Medicine at Dartmouth.

The journal has featured work by Guggenheim fellows, winners of the William Carlos Williams Poetry Competition, doctors, patients, students and faculty of the Geisel School of Medicine and Dartmouth College, as well as from new authors and artists. Fiction from the journal has been included in The Best American Short Stories series. In 2013, a short story featured by the journal was performed as a one-act play at The Players' Ring Theater in Portsmouth, NH.

== History ==
Lifelines was founded in 2002 by Sai Li (MED’06) and established with the publication of the first issue in Fall 2004. The journal is published annually.

Li envisioned the journal as a canvas for literature and art that would "enhance the atmosphere of the health-care community by instilling in its readers a respect for the enduring human spirit and a profound hope for better understanding and dialogue between doctors and patients."

The journal is supported by the Office of Diversity, Inclusion, and Community Engagement at the Geisel School of Medicine at Dartmouth, and the Fannie and Alan Leslie Center for the Humanities at Dartmouth College. The copyright is owned by the Trustees of Dartmouth College. Initially an online publication, the journal is now published in print and cataloged by the Rauner Special Collections Library at Dartmouth College.

== Content ==
The prose, poetry, and art featured in the journal aim to represent the multitude of human experiences in life, illness, and death. The journal seeks to overcome the separation in discourse between science and the humanities, while recognizing the challenges in combining the two.

Lifelines publishes work by current and former students, faculty, writers, and artists. Priority for inclusion in the journal is given to students, faculty, and alumni of the medical school, but exceptions are made for distinguished work.

== Chief Editors ==
- Sai Li, 2004
- Cara Haberman, 2005
- Meghan McCoy, 2006
- Cindy Nu Chai, 2008
- Jessica Linden Swienckowski, 2012
- Rachel LaRocca, 2013
- Lawrence Kuklinski, 2013
- Liam Guerin, 2017
- George Knaysi, 2018
- Cameron Yi, 2018
- Colin McLeish, 2019
- Diana Lee, 2019
- Renisa Ramnath, 2019

== See also ==
- Dartmouth College publications
