= Healthcare in Kosovo =

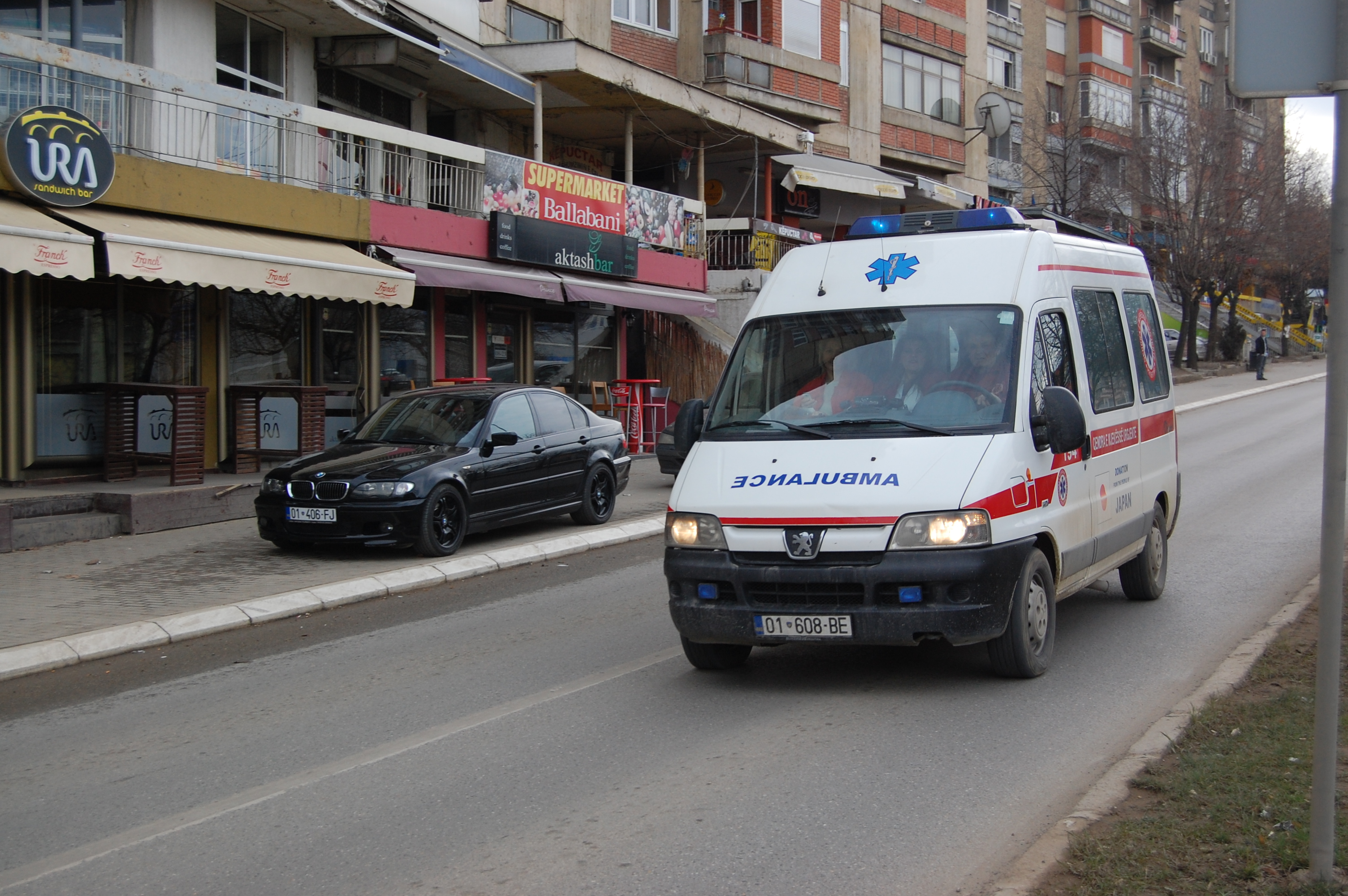
A Kosovar ambulance responding

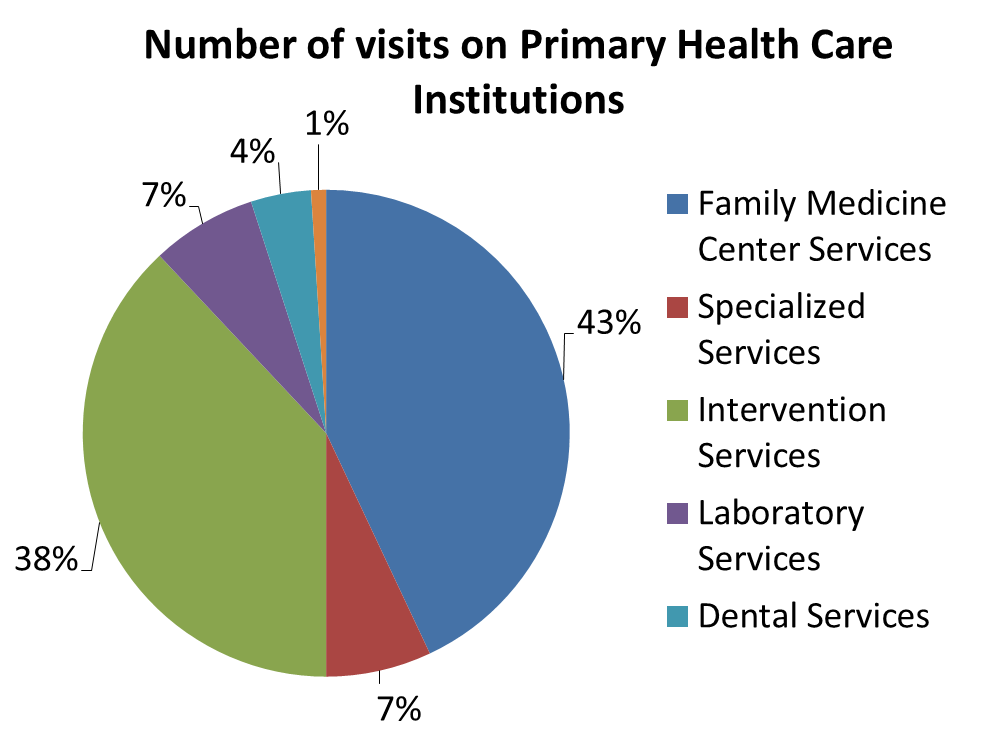
Patient safety in Kosovo

In the past, Kosovo’s capabilities to develop a modern health care system were limited. Low GDP in 1990 worsened the situation even further. However, the establishment of the Faculty of Medicine in the University of Pristina marked a significant development in health care. This was also followed by launching different health clinics which enabled better conditions for professional development.

Nowadays the situation has changed and health care system in Kosovo is organized into three sectors including, primary, secondary and tertiary health care. Primary health care in Pristina is organized into 13 Family Medicine Centers and 15 Ambulantory Care Units. Secondary health care is decentralized in seven Regional Hospitals. Though Pristina does not have a Regional Hospital, it instead uses the University Clinical Center of Kosovo for health care services. The University Clinical Center of Kosovo provides its health care services in 12 clinics, where 642 doctors are employed. At a lower level, home services are provided for several vulnerable groups which are not able to reach health care premises. Kosovo health care services are now focused on patient safety, quality control and assisted health.

== Statistics ==
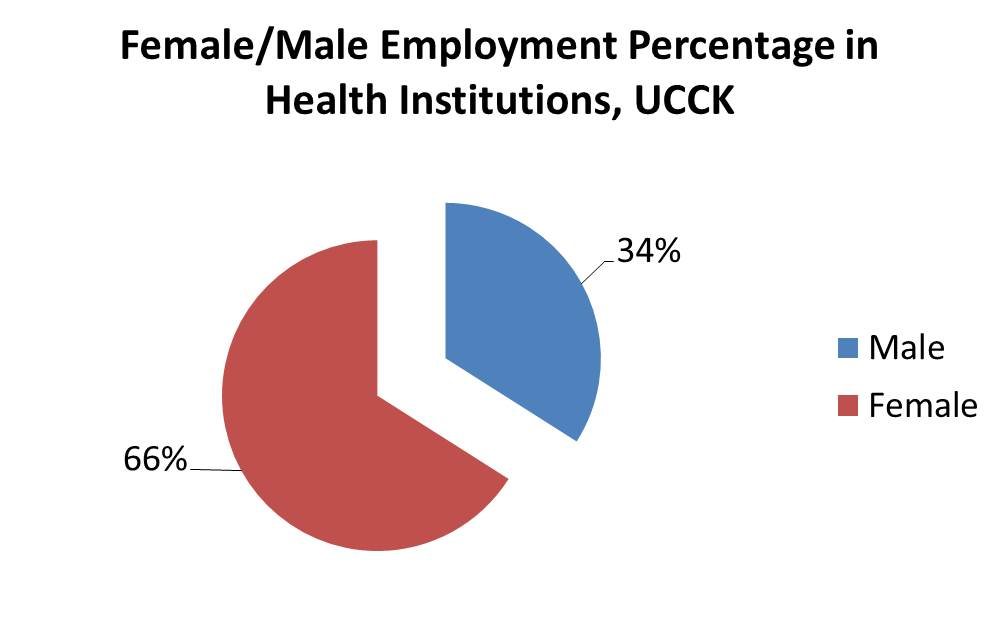
Female (66%) and male (34%) employment percentage in health institutions (UCCK)

The Statistical Agency of Kosovo is a professional institution operating since 1948, located in Pristina, which collects, processes and publishes official statistical data. Since 2011, this agency functions under the Prime Minister's office. It is funded by the Kosovo Consolidated Budget and it is supported by donors. They have professional and technical cooperation with all ministries of Kosovo's Government, especially with the Ministry of Economy and Finance, the Central Bank of Kosovo, Eurostat, International Monetary Fund, World Bank, SIDA, DFID, UNFPA, UNDP, UNICEF and many other international institutions. According to a study made by Kosovo's Ministry of Public Administration, the number of female employees in Kosovo's health institutions was distinctly greater during the previous years. In 2010 there were 8,928 female employees and 4,282 males. This number had a minor increase in favor of male employees by one percent in 2012.

University Clinical Center of Kosovo (UCCK) had 870 doctors in 2010. In 2012 this number dropped to 642. The department of gynaecology had the most personnel throughout the previous three years, while neurosurgery had the lowest.

The mortality rate in 2009 was 836 patients in regional hospitals of which 39% were in Prizren's Regional Hospital, 21.5% in Peja, 20% in Gjakova, 17.7% in Gjilan, 1.0% in Vushtrri and 0.1% in Ferizaj. In 2010 the regional mortality rate was 806.

== Health care divisions ==
After the 1999 war, there have been major improvements in health care. Medical services received several donations and international financial support raised dramatically. Many buildings have been constructed and renovated, the number of staff expanded, and the number of patients seeking medical services increased substantially. The highest health care authority in the Republic of Kosovo is Ministry of Health of Kosovo.

As in other countries, Kosovo's health care system is organized into three levels: primary, secondary and tertiary health care.

=== Primary Health Care (PHC) ===
Primary health care relates to the professional health care services offered to the community, usually from a nurse or general practitioner. It covers a wide range of health and preventative services such as supporting and taking care equally for all community, including those who have lower income, provide health education, counseling disease prevention, screening and promoting better living environments. Primary health care became a fundamental concept for World Health Organization as a result of the Alma Ata Declaration (1978). Since the Declaration of Alma-Ata, health situation at country level has gone through major changes. There have been many modifications in demographic profiles, socio-economic environment and reducement of risk exposure and common diseases. Primary health care is available for individuals and families, coming from different municipalities, with affordable costs that can be covered by the Government funds as well as community. Kosovo consists of an overall 36 municipalities, all of which have their own PHC medical centers. Kosovo Primary Health Care is organized in two separate levels such as: Family Medicine Centers (FM) and Ambulatory Health Care Units. Geographically isolated municipalities have established also some maternities, such as Women Welfare Centers, that serve for women emergency well-being cases.

==== Family Medicine Centers ====
The table below shows main Family Medicine Centers in Prishtina and their locations.

CENTERS	LOCATION
QKMF	St."Fehmi Agani" Nr.20
QMF-I	St."Ilir Konushefci"
QMF-II	Kodra e Trimave
QMF-III	St."Xheladin Kurbaliu"
QMF-IV	St."Xhemajl Ibishi"
QMF-V	St."Nena Tereze"-Dardani
QMF-VI	St."Hyzri Talla"
QMF-VII	Emshir
QMF-VIII	St. "Eduard Lir"
QMF	Hajvali
QMF	Besi Besi
QMF	Mat Matiqan
DAT	St."Fehmi Agani" Nr.20
Dental polyclinic	St."Luan Haradinaj" Nr.20

==== Ambulatory Medical Units ====
The table below shows Ambulatory Medical Units in Prishtina and their locations.

CENTERS	ADDRESS
Ambulance	Llukare
Ambulance	Keqekolle
Ambulance	Koliq
Ambulance	Dabishevc
Ambulance	Shkabaj
Ambulance	Barileve
Ambulance	Bardhosh
Ambulance	Kishnice
Ambulance	Slivove
Ambulance	Viti
Ambulance	Bullaj
Ambulance	Flotacion
Ambulance	Mramur
Ambulance	Rimanisht
Emergency	Ulpiana

Lack of family medicine specialists

Primary Medical Centers usually deal with problems such as short data on citizen registry, incorrect addresses and a large number of community migration from rural to urban areas. By 2013, the Ministry of Health had signed an agreement with a British college to train Kosovo graduated doctors in the UK. Family Health Care Centers in Kosovo were in need of 1,000 family medical specialists and had only half that number of doctors providing primary health care services.

=== Secondary health care ===
Secondary health care refers to a higher level of health care system, in which patients from primary health care are referred for more specialized treatments. Secondary health care level includes medical services provided by a specialist or more advanced facilities, upon referral from a primary care physician that requires more specialized knowledge, skill or equipment than the primary care physician. Secondary prevention programs identify and treat asymptomatic people, who have already been exposed to different risk factors or have any pre-clinical diseases, without any clinical symptoms. These activities are focused on early screening of asymptomatic patients that are prone to develop the disease without any possible prevention or treatment. Screening tests are an example of secondary prevention activities, since they are performed even on patients who have not manifested any clinical symptoms of diseases, such as: hyperlipidemia, hypertension, breast, prostate cancer and many others. Secondary health care is offered by regional hospitals in municipalities such as Mitrovica, Peć, Gjakova, Prizren and Gjilan.

==== Regional hospitals ====
Besides University Clinical Center of Kosovo (UCCK), which is the only tertiary health care center, there are also seven regional hospitals that offer secondary health care services. Most of referred patients to UCCK come from regional hospitals. Regional hospitals in Kosovo are:

- Prizren’s regional hospital
- Peć’s regional hospital
- Gjakova’s regional hospital
- Ferizaj’s regional hospital
- Gjilan’s regional hospital
- Mitrovica’s regional hospital
- Vushtrri’s regional hospital

=== Tertiary Health Care ===
Tertiary health care is the highest specialized medical level, which offers more complex procedures and treatments performed by specialists. Tertiary activities involve treatment of already established diseases, manages to restore patients to their highest functional level, minimizes negative effects of disease and further complications.

Kosovo's tertiary health care specialized medical services are offered by medical institutions such as University Clinical Center of Kosovo, University Dentistry Clinical Center of Kosovo, National Blood Transfusion Center, National Institute of Labor Medicine, Medical Center for Sport and Recreation, National Institute of Public Health and Faculty of Medicine, University of Pristina. Many tertiary health care services are mistakenly used instead of primary and secondary health care services from Kosovo inhabitants.

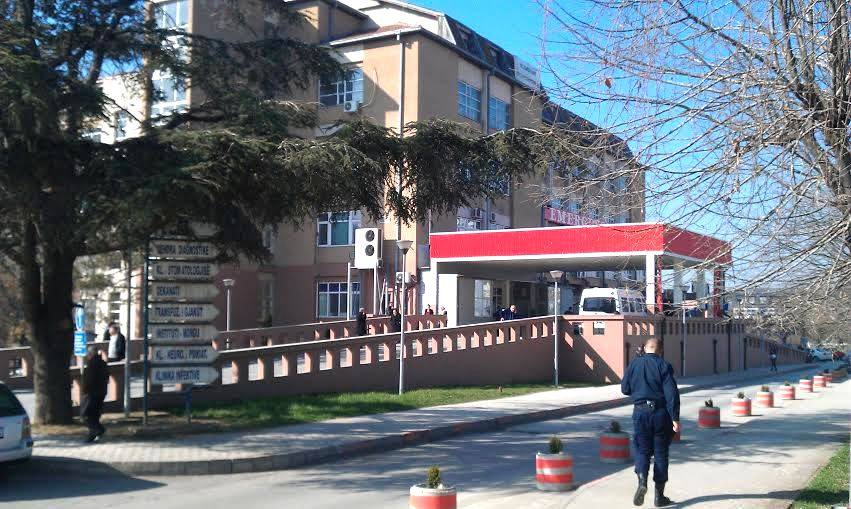
Universal Clinical Center of Kosovo - Emergency department

==== University Clinical Center of Kosovo (UCCK) ====
University Clinical Center of Kosovo is the main tertiary health care institution located in Prishtina, which offers most specialized medical services. It consists of Emergency Care Center, 12 clinics, National Institute of Public Health, Central Pharmacy, Private Pharmacies, and Institutes like Anatomy, Pathology, Physiology, Pharmacology and Toxicology.

UCCK Clinics - Human Resources

This table shows the overall human resources working in University Clinical Center of Kosovo, including specialized doctors and nurses for 12 clinics, Emergency Care Unit, National Institute of Public Health Kosovo and Central Pharmacy.

UCCK	Specialized Doctors	Nurses	Total Employees
Pulmonary Clinic	11	36	47
Pediatric surgery Clinic	7	25	32
Neurosurgery Clinic	7	25	32
Urology Clinic	11	31	42
Surgery Clinic	52	164	216
Dermatology & Sexually transmitted diseases Clinic	18	25	43
Gynecology & Obstetrics Clinic	61	265	326
National Institute of Public Health	37	27	64
Anesthetic and Intensive Care Unit	44	154	202
Central Pharmacy	21	20	41
Psychiatry Clinic	16	47	63
Neurology Clinic	19	59	78
Pediatric Clinic	37	176	213
Orthopedic Clinic	37	103	140
Emergency Care Center	20	78	98

==== National Institute of Public Health in Kosovo ====
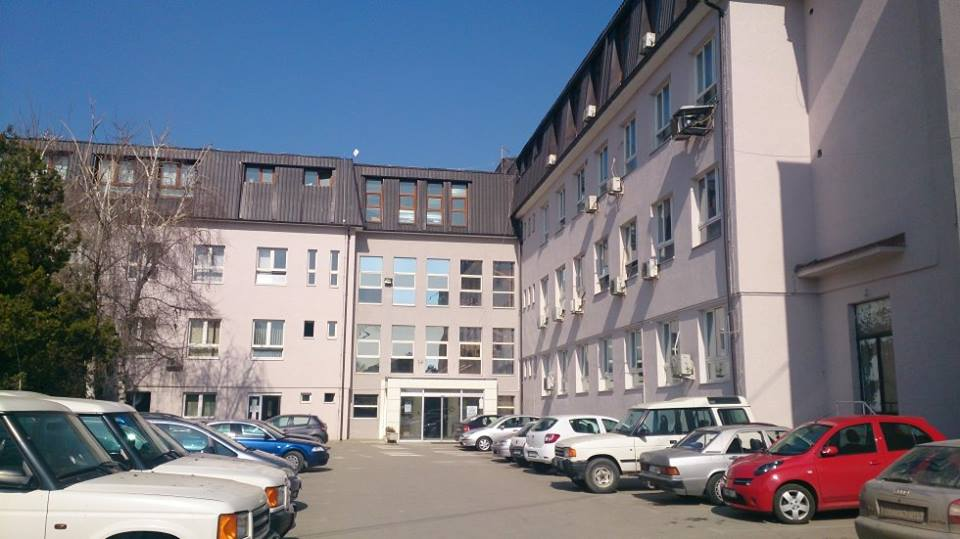
National Institute of Public Health Kosovo

National Institute of Public Health (NIPH) was established on 5 June 1925 and it is the highest medical, professional, and scientific institution. The institution organizes and applies the strategy of public health hygienic-sanitary measures, prophylactic-epidemically measures, social-medical, health education, EPI (expanded program on immunization), health promotion, water, food and air quality controls, health policy, economy of health, and develops scientific research works in the territory of the Republic of Kosovo. Hence, the institute is known as the educational base of the Faculty of Medicine and is divided in five departments: Epidemiology, Human Ecology, Social Medicine, Micro-biology and Health Information System; Kosovo School of Public Health.

Development history of NIPH

The 1920s were characterized by very bad medical conditions in the Balkans. In general, based on the Kosovar health care condition and the overall public health situation, a decision was made to establish hygiene and epidemiological services in the city of Peć with the "Rockefeller" fund support from the US and on 5 June 1925 this service finally began to work. On the same day, basis were set for Preventive Medicine in Kosovo and 5 June is marked as a festive day for the founding of the Institute of Public Health. After that date, sanitary stations, hygienic and microbiological or epidemiological services were established in Pristina, Prizren and Mitrovica. In these units there was a great lack of specialized staff (except in Prizren), but health services were performed by health employees with medical school degrees. In ancient Prizren, during 1923/1924, was established a highly efficient bacteriological service which provided services to the entire territory of Kosovo (at that time a part of Sandžak and Montenegro). Yet, Dr. Isuf Dedushaj stated that it was only the bacteriological service which later developed into the hygienic-sanitary services in order to be later transformed into the Regional Institute of Public Health of Prizren. During the years 1946/1947, the first Albanian doctor Dr. Durmish Celina started his work by developing educational-medical activities. At that time, Dr. Daut Mustafa lectured professional courses in the medical high school too.

The Inheritance of many infectious diseases had damaged the country in terms of economy, culture, education, and health. Prior to World War II and especially after it ended, the health condition and the circumstances in Kosovo were extremely difficult. There were many serious infectious diseases such as: malaria, typhus, louse, tuberculosis, measles, meningitis, diphtheria, and other diseases which led to the deaths of hundreds to thousands of infants. In Kosovo in 1940 there were five hospitals with 390 beds, 36 different ambulatory medical and preventive services that had five sanitary-epidemiological stations, from which only three were working. Dr. Isuf Dedushaj stated that in all these medical institutions there were 38 doctors, 20 private pharmacists, one dentist, and around 85 medical workers. After World War II, Kosovo had terrible living conditions and the illiteracy rate was about 98 percent.

In the early 1946, Kosovo had five hospitals with 333 beds, on average 0.4 beds per 1,000 inhabitants, nine doctors (foreign and local), 15 pharmacists, six medical technicians, 11 cleaners, and 27 other medical workers with lower qualification. Medical protection was offered in eight cities, three villages, and one anti-tuberculosis dispensary, whereas in the dental prevention program there were four dentists.

==== University Dentistry Clinical Center (UDCCK) ====
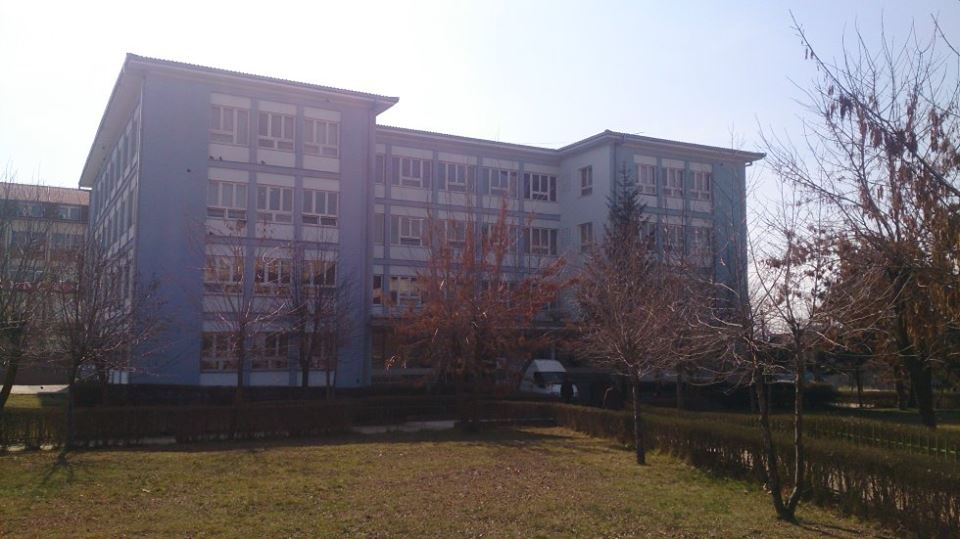
University dentistry clinical center-Kosovo

University Dentistry Clinical Center (UDCCK) is located in Pristina and it is the main medical, educational, and scientific institution in the field of dentistry in Kosovo, and their mission is to maintain and develop good oral health. Their staff participates in different local and international meetings, training, professional and scientific conferences. The outcome of these activities is primarily increasing the efficiency of the dental procedures in order to maintain with the contemporary developments in dentistry. The application of the Health Information System in UDCCK endorsed their work in developing in terms of dental medicine, since it provides reliable data, in collaboration with the Ministry of Health in Kosovo, to establish dental medicine welfare in general.

Development history of UDCCK

The history of Kosovo dental medicine began with the practical training in the laboratory of Medical High School in Pristina. At that time, dentistry section was established where 96 dentists worked. The Section of Dentistry was organized in independent working units and they were: Prosthetic Dental Clinic, Tooth Disease Clinic, Mouth Disease Clinic, Preventive Dentistry Clinic, Oral Surgery, Teeth and X-ray Laboratory and Working Community. In Dentistry Section there were 177 employers, 44 doctors, 20 assistants, nine trainee assistants, 29 dental technicians, 50 medical technician, 15 administrative staff and 32 support staff. The educational and health activities were mainly conducted in the Charitable Humanitarian Organization "Mother Teresa" in Prishtina. Since June 1999, dentistry clinics became part of the UDCCK until November 2003, when an important event for dentistry occurred when the Ministry of Health issued an Administrative Instruction 12/2003, on the Establishment of UDCCK as an autonomous and independent institution from University Clinical Center of Kosovo (UCCK).

==== Private registered Dentistry Clinics ====
Based on the publications of Ministry of Health in Kosovo, there are only 248 licensed private dental clinics, even though there are around 921 registered dental clinics through Kosovo.

=== Private hospitals ===
Licensed Private hospitals in Kosovo are the following: Special Hospital for Cardiovascular Diseases "Intermed", Specialized Hospital for Cardiovascular Diseases "International Medicine Hospital", and Cabinet Coronarography "Diagnostica".

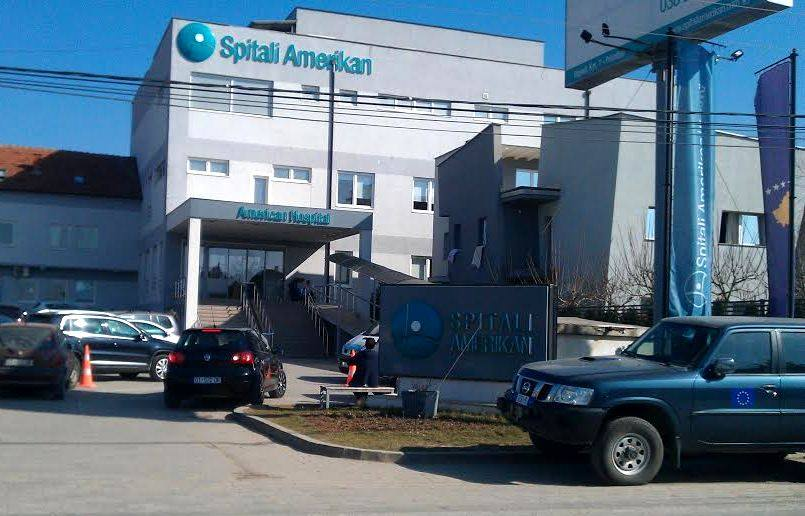
American Hospital in Pristina

American Hospital is a private hospital in Pristina inaugurated on 6 April 2012. American Hospital in Kosovo is a Bedminster Capital Management Fund investment, based in New York, whose participants are the Government of the United States of America. It is represented by the Office of Foreign Investment (OPIC), the European Bank for Reconstruction and Development and different American investors. It has an area of 3000m2, four floors, 30 hospital beds, three surgery rooms, two maternity rooms, two suites with advanced equipment and about 100 employees available to provide professional medical services.

=== University of Pristina, Faculty of Medicine ===
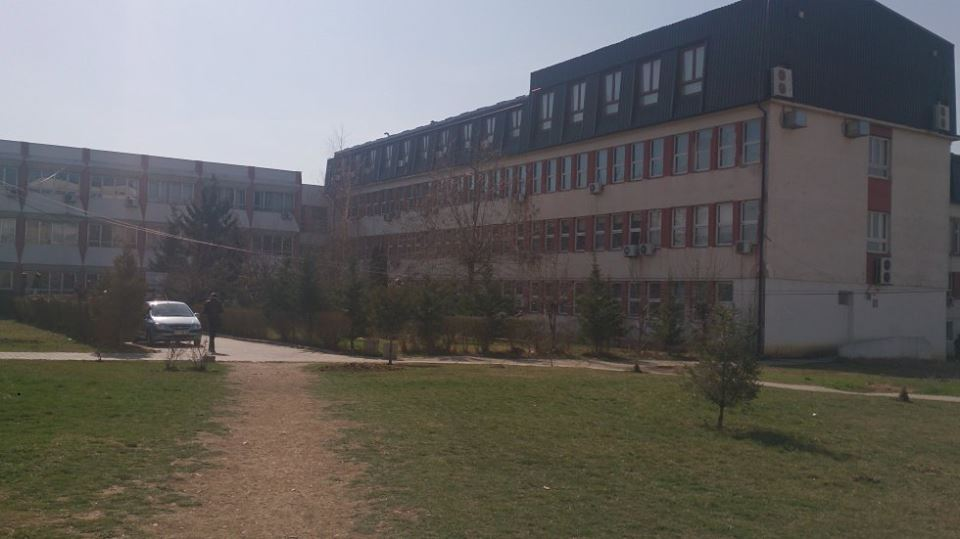
Faculty of Medicine, Decanate-University of Prishtina

University of Pristina was founded on June 17, 1969, and started working in December that year. First lectures were held in the philosophic department of the university.

Faculty of Medicine consists of six departments including general medicine, pharmacy, physiotherapy, dentistry, and nursery. The General Medicine and Dentistry studies last six years, Pharmacy lasts five years, whereas Physiotherapy and Nursery are each three years.

Initially the Faculty of Medicine in Pristina started off with only General medicine, but six years later Dentistry was founded, followed on May 15, 1996, by the Pharmacy section. In 2001 Physiotherapy was founded.

Nowadays, Faculty of Medicine, University of Prishtina is an integral part of University Clinical Center of Kosovo.

Departments, students

By 2012 about 1,985 students attended medical lectures each year. The Minister of Health, Prof. Dr. Ferid Agani, stated that "Faculty of Medicine is looking forward to become an independent part of University of Pristina, and the whole idea is to create Biomedical University whose rector will be a doctor, and the six departments of Faculty of Medicine will be transferred to the Biomedical University. If established, the Medical Science Faculty will be the third public university in Kosovo, right after University of Pristina and University of Prizren.

== Regulation and oversight ==
=== Ministry of Health ===
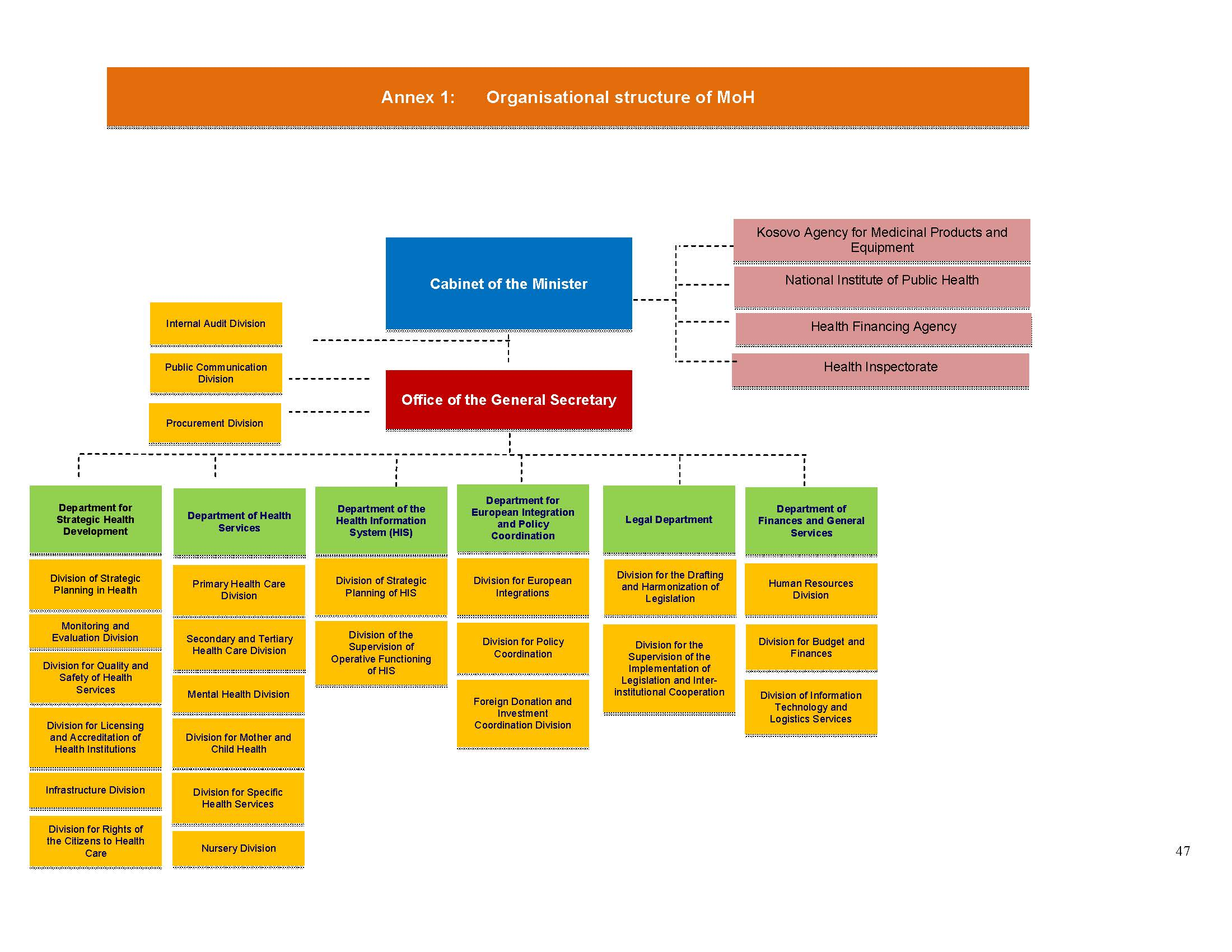
Ministry of Health of Kosovo Organizational Chart

The Ministry of Health operates under the Government of Kosovo in accordance with its Constitution and applicable laws. The Government of Kosovo is composed by the prime minister, vice-prime ministers and ministers. It is located in the centre of the capital of Kosovo, Prishtina. The work of Ministry of Health is organized through the Department of Finance and general Services, Legal Department, Department for Health Information Systems, Department for Health Services, Department for European Integration and Policy Coordination, Department for Strategic Health Development and Department for Health Services in Prisons. The Ministry of Health is responsible, among others, to draft policies and ensure law implementation, promote non-discrimination approach on health care system, sets norms and standards respecting relevant international health standards. The ministry of Health coordinates activities in the health sector including environment protection. Kosovo Health care functions are based on the following principles: equity, quality, equal treatment, sustainable financial conditions, and cost-efficient services.

=== Directorate of Health, Municipality of Prishtina ===
Department of Health and Social Welfare

According to the local government laws, the department of Health and Social Welfare creates strategies for primary health care, diagnosis and basic health care, including minor surgeries, oral health promotion and basic dental care, quality assurance of food and water, ensuring the provision of social services and families within its territory, through the activities of the Center for Social Work (CSW) or by providing financial or other assistance to non-governmental organizations dealing with this activity.

== Public Health Care Institution's Human Resources compared to other countries ==
The table below shows, Human Resources working in Public Health Care institutions in Kosovo, compared to other countries, based on Health Sector Strategy provided from Ministry of Health Kosovo.

Place	Number	Doctor per 1000 inhabitants	Year	Number	Dentists per 1000 inhabitants	Year	Number	Nurses per 1000 inhabitants	Year
Kosovo	1941	0.94	2006	114	0.06	2006	5374	2.61	2006
Albania	4100	1.31	2002	630	0.03	2001	11473	3.62	2002
Serbia and Montenegro	27738	2.06	2002	3792	0.36	2002	48875	4.64	2002
United States	730801	2.56	2000	463663	1.63	2000	2.669603	9.37	2000
Sweden	29122	3.28	2002	7270	0.82	2002	90758	10.24	2002
Croatia	10820	2.44	2003	3085	0.70	2003	22372	5.05	2003

== Health care system efficiency and equity ==
Different national and international reports have shown that Kosovo inhabitants are very unsatisfied with health care services offered, and corruption is prevalent and a persistent challenge for health sector, though such conclusions were reached without in-depth analyses. UNDP committed on designing Public Pulse Report, to conduct more in-depth analyses around perceptions of corruption in health sector, and measure patient satisfaction with health care services in Kosovo. Public Pulse Report recruited a sample of 1,334 patients, who were treated in public health care institutions around Kosovo. Results showed that patients are highly satisfied with health care services offered, due to the fact that more than 70% answered to be satisfied or very satisfied with the health care services, personnel and support they received in the health care institutions. Meanwhile, corruption was shown to be less prevalent than reported in other studies, only 4 percent of respondents solicited for a bribe during their most recent visit in public health care centers.

- Overall satisfaction with healthcare institutions

Results of Public Pulse Report, indicate that respondents were generally satisfied with health care services offered in Family Medicine Centers, Regional hospitals and University Clinical Center of Kosovo. The highest dissatisfaction was shown with University Clinical Center performance. Almost 30% of respondents were unsatisfied with treatment offered. On the other hand, 70% were satisfied or highly satisfied. Additionally, 25% of patients treated on Regional Hospitals and Family Medicine Centers were unsatisfied or very unsatisfied with health care services, while only 15% of patients treated on private clinics were unsatisfied. Meanwhile, patients who visited pharmacies expressed high satisfaction with services obtained, 86% were satisfied. Therefore, the most satisfied patients were the ones who received services in pharmacies and private health care institutions, followed by patients who were treated in Regional Hospitals and Family Medicine Centers.

- Costs of medical treatments

The majority of Public Pulse Report respondents (43 percent), declared that they did not pay for services offered in public health care institutions. Only 666 respondents out of 1,334, paid for health care services provided. Patients coming from rural areas, approximately pay 50 to 200 Euros, to travel to their closest medical center, which still remains one of the most concerning problems of the Kosovo health care system.

- Doctor performance

Public Pulse Report respondents (16%), were mostly concerned of the short time doctors spent with them and their involvement in decision-making was very low. The strongest attribute of Kosovo doctors is the respect they give to their patients, since only 225 (15%) of patients complained on that side.

- Perceptions on presence of corruption on health care

Corruption still remains a big challenge for public health care institutions. From the Public Pulse Report, 52 respondents (4%) of the sample answered affirmatively, indicating that they were solicited during their last visit. On the other hand, the majority (96%) did not report such situations. Bribes are mostly used as a way to obtain easier and earlier health care services in public health care institutions.

== Immunization ==
Kosovo has a fixed and regimented childhood immunization schedule as part of the Kosovo National Immunization Program. This schedule is supported by Article 28 of the Law for Prevention and Fighting against Infectious Diseases 2007 that mandates that childhood vaccination for tuberculosis, hepatitis B, whooping cough, diphtheria, child paralysis, tetanus, measles, parotitis and rubella are obligatory. According to the same law, failure to adhere to this will result in a 500 to 1000 euro fine.

== Abortion ==
Abortion laws in Kosovo derive from a Yugoslav-era law with a 10-week term limit for abortion on request.

== Drug efficacy and safety ==
In the region of Prishtina there are 116 Licensed Pharmacies Registered. They are all licensed from Kosovo Medicines Agency (KMA) and Kosovo Customs which has the duty to control the import of pharmaceutical products and medical devices. Hence, a valid import license is required in order to import these products and it is regulated by the Law on Medical products and Equipment, No. 03/L-188, Article 14, and other legal norms. KMA is liable to protect the health, provide quality and guaranteed medical products, equipment, and services through the licensing of professional companies and individuals and yet, "regulates the production, import and distribution of medicinal products, active substances, herbal products, dietary supplements, excipients, therapeutic dosage vitamins, medical equipment (medical imaging machines, medical lasers, life support equipment, in vitro diagnostic, etc)."

== Kosovo Health Care Budget ==
The table below shows the Kosovo Health Care Budget for 2012, based on Health Statistics 2012 report prepared from Kosovo Prime Minister's office.

Expenses	Amount
Salaries	40,610,525
Goods and services	41,606,936
Municipality expenses	3,502,073
Subventions and transfers	3,881,863
Capital investments	18,709,282
Total	108,310,679

== Health Reform ==
Health reform system has been discussed for a long time in the post-war period. Fourteen years after the 1999 war, there were still serious problems in the health sector, including ongoing efforts on health care reform and health care insurance law implementation. Delays on law voting process, because of some technical errors, have a direct impact on beginning the reformation process of the health care system. These delays of implementation are mostly happening because of the ongoing debate as to whether the law should or should not state that public sector should be divided from the private sector in the health care system. Health care specialists claim that opposition of dividing the two sectors is intended to be done by law with the purpose to undergo the ambiguity embedded in UCCK. Recently, Chambers of Doctors started operating, which now immediately will lead to further progression on health reform. The Chamber of Doctors is going to be responsible for forming the ethical code and also to decentralize and carry out major responsibilities that currently are those of the Ministry of Health. In ongoing public debates on Health Care System and Health Care Insurance law, small changes are requested in favor of citizens, including also health care insurance coverage for every citizen of Kosovo.

== Health Insurance ==
Health Insurance through the years

The health care sector within the last 60 years, has passed through a very difficult transition period. Social insurance, also including health insurance packages, in Kosovo first started in 1945 based on certain by-laws. During that time there were many attempts to try to spread health insurance packages within different society categories. After some profound constitutional changes in the former Yugoslavia in 1965, all residents were covered by a basic health insurance package, founded by Government special fund. From the 1970s to 90s, due to a very complicated political situation, health insurance coverage was not possible. From 1999, when Kosovo finally became independent, there was a 60 million dollar investment in the health sector with some further investment since.

Health Insurance in recent years

In 2007, Kosovo health insurance law was approved. Funds for health insurance packages were collected from personal income taxes. After a period of time, fund generation was not proving adequate and a new health insurance law was being reconsidered. Comparing Kosovo to regional countries, Kosovo is the only country that still does not have an approved and functional health insurance law. Kosovo Healthcare Reform includes some profound changes in financial, organizational and functional healthcare systems, also targeting a Health Insurance Law. Kosovo Federation of Health Syndicate targets are the following:

- Constructing legal infrastructure, than creating Health Insurance Law;
- Offering a basic package for all Kosovo inhabitants;
- Offering qualitative services;
- Creating and maintaining regional network with other states, learning from their experiences.

Though health insurance is an essential human right, as of 2012 many Kosovo inhabitants still consider health insurance an expensive luxury. Up to date, all health care services provided in public facilities are covered by governmental funds, distributed to the Municipal Health Directorate. Only two percent of Kosovo inhabitants are covered by private health insurance companies.

=== Private insurance companies ===
Established in 2002, private insurance companies were organized in agreement with Kosovo's licensed bodies into the Insurance Association of Kosovo (IAS). It seeks to improve the insurance industry in Kosovo, to stabilize the insurance market and to offer company training. The insurance companies in Kosovo are the following:

Health Insurance Company	Services offered
SIGURIA	Third party liability, Casco, personal, health, property, home, and construction risk insurance
SIGKOS	Vehicle, Casco, personal, guarantees, health, property, liability, contractors all risks, erection all risks, cash in safe and cash in transit insurance
SIGAL UNIQA GROUP AUSTRIA KOSOVO	Health, life, vehicle, property, guarantees, financial, engineering, liability, agriculture, marine, aviation and product transportation insurance
ILLYRIA	Health, vehicle and property insurance
GRAWE ELSIG	Vehicle, accident, property, health, guarantees and liability insurance

== Medical Agencies and Associations ==
Patients' Rights Association in Kosovo (PRAK) is an independent and non-profit association. Its main activities include promotion, education, public meetings, information outreach, conferences, and seminars.

Albanian Health Initiative (AHI) goal is to identify and eliminate health care inequalities that exist in the Albanian-American community. This initiative promotes preventive screening measures and efficient utilized health care resources, in order to improve the quality of care and strengthen the patient-physician relationship. Since 2000, Dr. James C. Strickler, emeritus Professor of Medicine, Family Medicine Doctor, and former Dean of Dartmouth Medical School, has supervised the student exchange program between Dartmouth Medical School and University of Pristina, Faculty of Medicine. More than 200 students have benefited from the program. Some Albanian exchange students have successfully obtained ECFMG certification, who have done research for medical institutions in the United States and have joined the Albanian American Medical Society. With the ongoing effort of Dr. Strickler, Geisel Medical School has raised more than $4.5 million for the development of health care programs in Kosovo.

Albanian Health Fund (AHF) has recruited, planned, and sent small teams of medical and surgical personnel to Albania who participated in teaching and clinical interaction with Albanian specialists. The AHF main goals are continuation of tutorials on given medical specialties for the Albanian medical community, providing medical supplies and equipment, organizing medical study trips to the United States for selected Albanian doctors and many other public activities.

MediGAL is the association of health managers in Kosovo. The latest and most important happening was the Swedish donation by Parlan of 350 external breast prostheses for patients after surgical mastectomy. The Kosovo Ministry of Health has recently signed a cooperation agreement between the Association of Kosovo Medical Health Management and Special Education Organization "Ozel Egitim Kurumlari Irem" from Turkey, for substantial cooperation in the health sector. The agreement commits to helping those patients who cannot receive treatment in Kosovo obtain treatment in Turkey by medical specialists. This agreement was signed by the Minister of Health Prof. Dr. Ferid Agani, Dr. Genc Demjaha DMD, MBA from MediGAL and Mr. Zylfikar Aklar of Irem Ozel Egitim Kurumlari.

== See also ==
- Government of Kosovo
- Demographics of Kosovo
