= Arantxa Colchero =

Mexican economist

Arantxa Colchero Aragonés
- Education: National Autonomous University of Mexico, National Institute of Public Health, Johns Hopkins University
- Occupation: Economist
- Known for: Health economics

Arantxa Colchero Aragonés is a Mexican economist specialized in health economics. She has designed strategies in fiscal policies and product labeling, to prevent and reduce obesity. She has been working on nutrition economics for more than 10 years, as well as HIV.

== Life ==
She graduated from National Autonomous University of Mexico, National Institute of Public Health, and Johns Hopkins University.

She was a research assistant in the Department of Epidemiology, at the National System of Researchers .

== Selected works ==
- La obesidad en México, Estado de la política pública y recomendaciones para su prevención y control.
- Aragonés, A. C., Loya, D. C., & de Cosío Martínez, T. G. 4. Costos de las prácticas inadecuadas de lactancia materna. Lactancia materna en México, 59.
- Gamboa Delgado, E., González de Cossío, T., Colchero Aragonés, A., Pelletier, D., Quezada, A. D., & Rodríguez Ramírez, S. (2014). Effect of a food aid program on BMI/A of Mexican children, mediated by diet (251.3). The FASEB Journal, 28, 251–3.
- Gamboa-Delgado, E. M., González de Cossío, T., & Colchero-Aragonés, A. (2016). Obesity risk in preschoolers beneficiaries of food aid programs. Revista de Salud Pública, 18(4), 643–655.
- Barrientos-Gutierrez, T., Zepeda-Tello, R., Rodrigues, E. R., Colchero-Aragonés, A., Rojas-Martínez, R., Lazcano-Ponce, E., ... & Meza, R. (2017). Expected population weight and diabetes impact of the 1-peso-per-litre tax to sugar sweetened beverages in Mexico. PLOS ONE, 12(5), e0176336.
