= University Clinical Center of Kosovo =

Main healthcare organization in Pristina, Kosovo

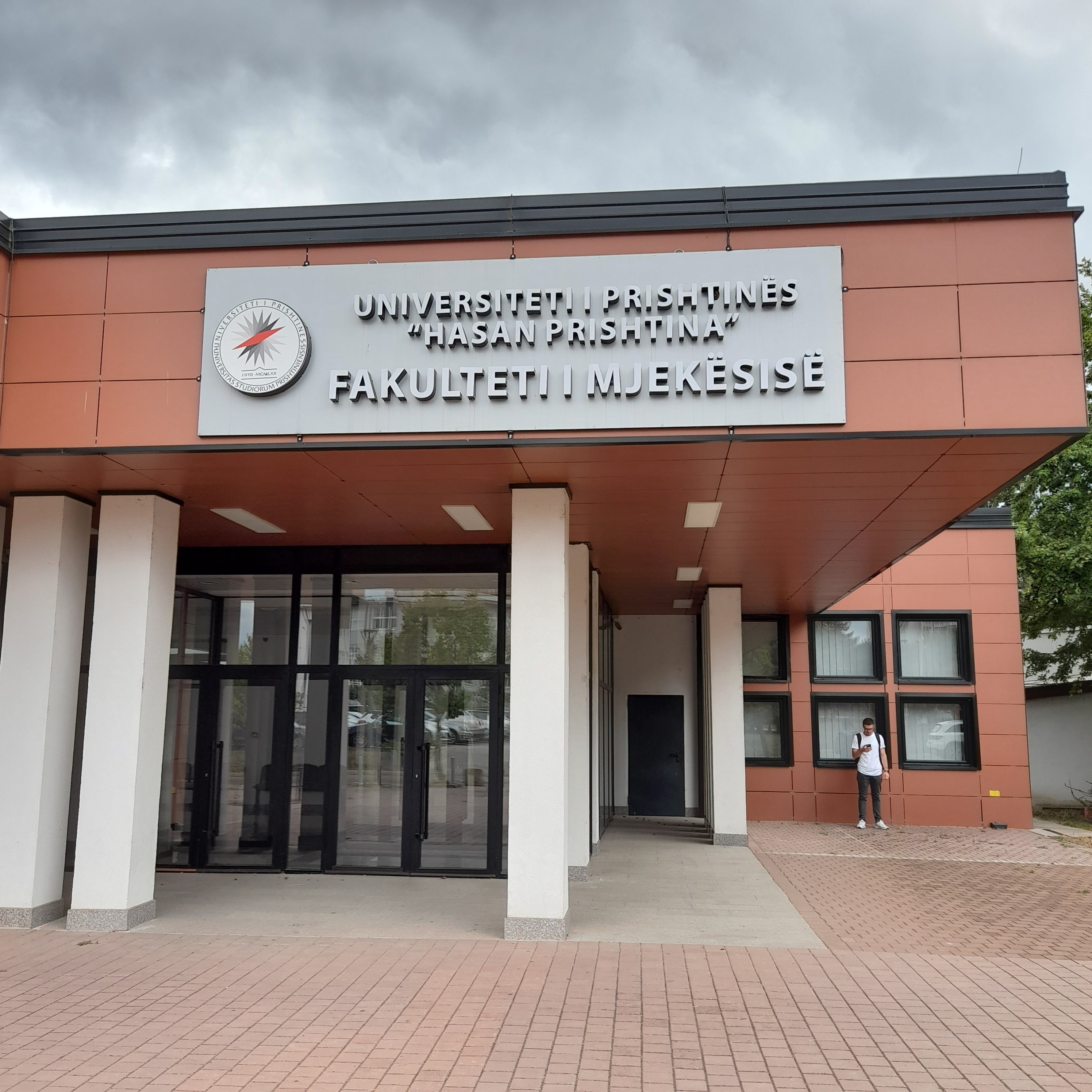
Faculty of Medicine of the University of Pristina

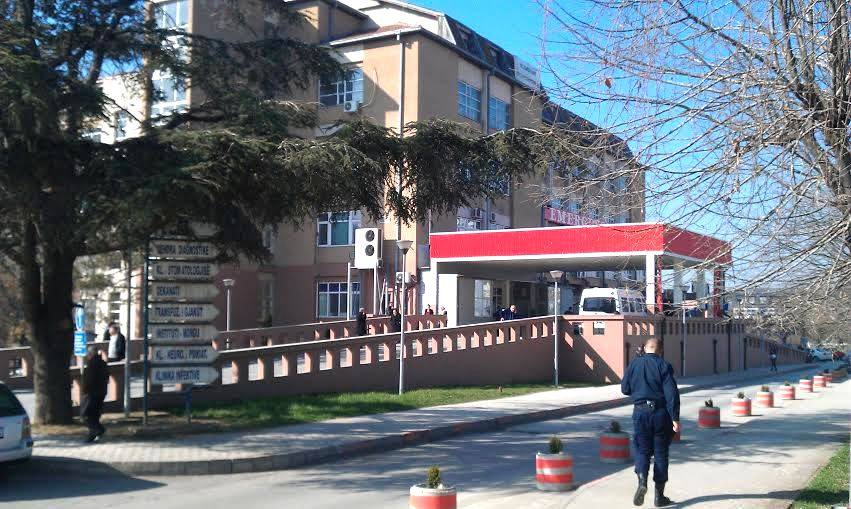
University Clinical Center of Kosovo - Emergency department

The University Clinical Center of Kosovo (UCCK; Albanian: Qendra Klinike Universitare e Kosovës; QKUK) is the largest and most prominent medical institution in Kosovo, located in Pristina, the capital city. The UCCK provides a wide range of medical services, including specialized treatments and surgeries, and plays a crucial role in healthcare delivery and medical education within Kosovo.

== Overview ==
The University Clinical Center of Kosovo started working in December 1958, initially under the name Hospital of Pristina, until the decision to establish the Faculty of Medicine of the University of Pristina, on June 17, 1969. On November 7, 1973, the Faculty of Medicine joined the Hospital of Pristina, as a United Work Organization. From December 29, 1977, until 1991, it acted as the working organization of the Faculty of Medicine.

UCCK serves as both a hospital and an educational institution, affiliated with the University of Pristina. It provides a wide range of medical services to patients from all over Kosovo. The hospital has over 1,000 beds and employs over 4,000 staff members, including doctors, nurses, and other healthcare professionals.

The hospital offers both inpatient and outpatient services. Inpatient services include diagnostics, treatment, and rehabilitation for a variety of medical conditions. Outpatient services include primary care, specialty care, and preventive care.

UCCK is also a center for medical education and research. The hospital has a medical school that trains future doctors, and it also conducts research in a variety of medical fields. It consists of Emergency Care Center, 12 clinics, National Institute of Public Health, Central Pharmacy, Private Pharmacies, and Institutes like Anatomy, Pathology, Physiology, Pharmacology and Toxicology.

=== UCCK - Human Resources ===
This table shows the overall human resources working in University Clinical Center of Kosovo, including specialized doctors and nurses for 12 clinics, Emergency Care Unit, National Institute of Public Health Kosovo and Central Pharmacy. (Data from 2010)

UCCK	Specialized Doctors	Nurses	Total Employees
Pulmonary Clinic	11	36	47
Pediatric surgery Clinic	7	25	32
Neurosurgery Clinic	7	25	32
Urology Clinic	11	31	42
Surgery Clinic	52	164	216
Dermatology & Sexually transmitted diseases Clinic	18	25	43
Gynecology & Obstetrics Clinic	61	265	326
National Institute of Public Health	37	27	64
Anesthetic and Intensive Care Unit	44	154	202
Central Pharmacy	21	20	41
Psychiatry Clinic	16	47	63
Neurology Clinic	19	59	78
Pediatric Clinic	37	176	213
Orthopedic Clinic	37	103	140
Emergency Care Center	20	78	98

== See also ==
- Healthcare in Kosovo
- University of Pristina
