= Brad Ludden =

American kayaker

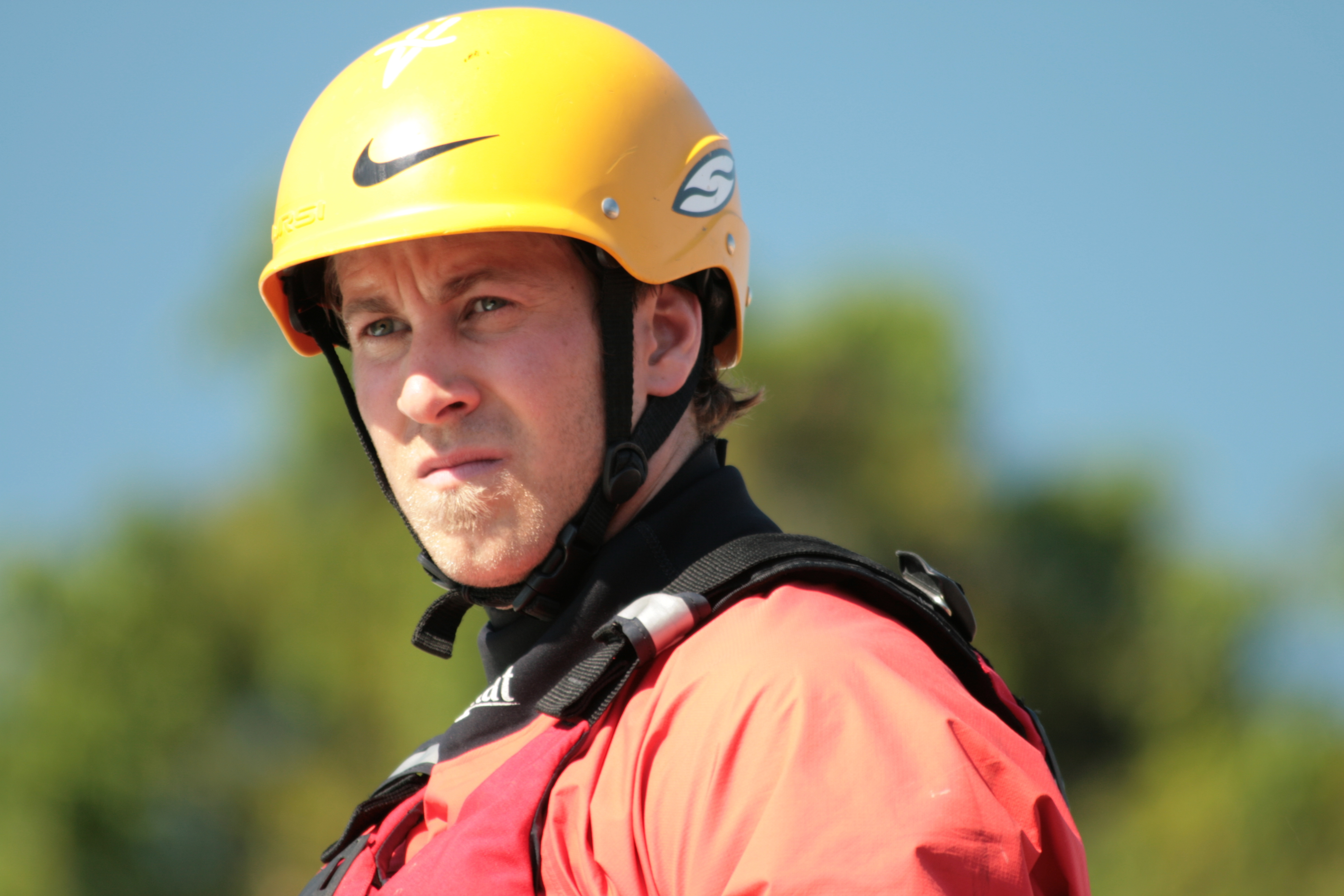
- Brad Ludden filming for a sponsor on the Mekong river in Laos, in 2008

Personal information
- Born: May 8, 1981 (age 45) Sheridan, Wyoming
- Years active: 1993–present
- Height: 5 ft 11 in (1.80 m)
- Weight: 190 lb (86 kg)

Sport
- Sport: kayaking

Brad Ludden is a professional kayaker born in Sheridan, Wyoming, on May 8, 1981. He started kayaking internationally at the age of twelve. His career has taken him to more than forty countries.

Ludden is the founder of a charity called First Descents, an organization that benefits cancer patients. At age 12, Brad learned his aunt was diagnosed with cancer, and shortly after his mother began volunteer work at a local pediatric oncology camp. He volunteered one day each summer, instructing campers on kayaking. This is when he realized he could serve his community while kayaking. In 1999 he began construction of First Descents and in 2001, construction was finished, with aid from The State of Colorado.

In 2008 he was named Cosmopolitan Magazine's "Hottest Bachelor in America." Ludden's has also started a blog known as Athletes Giving where he highlights athletes involved in charitable work. He lives in Kalispell, Montana. he has numerous sponsorship deals, including deals with Nike, Smith Optics . Dagger Kayaks, Subaru, AT Paddles, Kokatat , and Training Day.

== Philanthropy ==
First Descents - Founder

== Kayaking Career Competition Results ==
- 3rd Place Cadet Division at the JR Nationals 1994
- JR National Freestyle Champion 1999
- 3rd Place JR World Freestyle Championships 1997
- 1st Place Japan Open 1998
- 3rd Place European Open 1998
- x Freestyle Athlete of the year, Adventure Quest Kayak Academy 1998, 1999
- 2nd Place JR World Freestyle Championships 1999
- 1st Place Lofer Rodeo Austria 2000
- Teva Mountain Games medals between 2001 and 2008
