= Peter A. Olsson =

American psychiatrist and psychoanalyst

- Born: 1941 (age 84–85); Brooklyn, New York, U.S.
- Education: University of Vermont; Baylor College of Medicine; Wheaton College
- Known for: Malignant Pied Pipers of Our Time: A Psychological Study of Destructive Cult Leaders From the Rev. Jim Jones to Osama bin Laden
- Awards: 1979 Judith Baskin Offer Prize
- Scientific career
- Fields: Psychiatry, psychoanalysis
- Workplaces: Dartmouth Medical School
- Website: drpeterolsson.com

Peter A. Olsson (born 1941) is an American psychiatrist, psychoanalyst and author. He is author of the book, Malignant Pied Pipers of Our Time: A Psychological Study of Destructive Cult Leaders from Rev. Jim Jones to Osama bin Laden. Olsson won the 1979 Judith Baskin Offer Prize for his paper "Adolescent Involvement with the Supernatural and Cults."

== Medical career ==
Olsson has practiced medicine as a psychiatrist for more than 30 years in Texas and New Hampshire. He has published many scholarly papers and contributed chapters to eight books about psychology.

Olsson is an assistant professor of psychiatry, supervising medical residents at Dartmouth Medical School; Adjunct Clinical Professor of Psychiatry Baylor College of Medicine; Past President of the Houston Psychiatric Society; a graduate of the Houston-Galveston Psychoanalytic Institute; Fellow of the American Academy of Psychoanalysis; and Distinguished Life Fellow of the American Psychiatric Association.

Olsson won the 1979 Judith Baskin Offer Prize for his paper "Adolescent Involvement with the Supernatural and Cults."

== Malignant Pied Pipers of Our Time ==
Prior to publishing Malignant Pied Pipers of Our Time in 2005, Olsson had written scholarly articles on the subject; specifically on Osama bin Laden and Shoko Asahara. These include "A Malignant Pied Piper: Osama bin Laden", which also appeared as Chapter 5 in the book Jihad and Sacred Vengeance: Psychological Undercurrents of History, and "Shoko Asahara: The malignant pied piper of Japan". It was positively reviewed.

In 2006, Olsson gave the plenary speech at the annual meeting of The American Society of Psychoanalytic Physicians, where he spoke about his book, and took questions from fellow physicians.

== Awards and honors ==
- 1967 Award for Excellence in Psychiatry, Baylor College of Medicine
- 1969 William C. Mennuger Award, Central Neuropsychiatric Association, Honorable Mention for article: "Elective Mutism in Childhood"
- 1978 Houston Group Psychotherapy Society Award, Meritorious Contributions as Senior Faculty Member of Annual Institutes in Group Therapy
- 1979 Judith Baskin Offer Prize, paper "Adolescent Involvement with the Supernatural and Cults."
- 1999 Special Service Award, Texas Society of Psychiatric Physicians, San Antonio, Texas

== Professional associations ==
- Assistant professor of psychiatry, supervising medical residents at Dartmouth Medical School
- Adjunct Clinical Professor of Psychiatry, Baylor College of Medicine
- Past President, Houston Psychiatric Society
- Fellow, American Academy of Psychoanalysis
- Distinguished Life Fellow, American Psychiatric Association

== Education ==
- B.S., Wheaton College, 1963
- M.D., Baylor College of Medicine, 1967
- Internship, University of Vermont, 1968
- Psychoanalysis graduate training, Houston-Galveston Psychoanalytic Institute, 1981

== Publications ==
=== Books ===
- —— (2005). Malignant Pied Pipers of Our Time: A Psychological Study of Destructive Cult Leaders From the Rev. Jim Jones to Osama bin Laden. PublishAmerica. Also released as Malignant Pied Pipers.

=== Articles ===
- “Elective Mutism in Children: A Difficult Problem for The School and Therapist,” Medical Records and Annals of the Medical Center, Vol. 61, No. 11 (November, 1968): 366–370. Olsson, P.A. and Kraft I.
- “The B.U.D. in Chronic Alcoholics and Its Resolution Through Psychodrama,” 'Group Psychotherapy and Psychodrama, Vol. XXIII, No. 3-4 (1970): 84-90 Olsson, P.A. and Fankhauser, J.
- “Nonverbal Techniques in an Adolescent Group,” International Journal of Group Psychotherary (April, 1972): 186-191.Olsson, P.A. and Meyers, I.,
- “Psychodrama and Group Therapy with Young Heroin Addicts Returning from Duty in Vietnam,” Psychodrama and Group Psychotherapy, Vol. XXV, No. 4 (19973): 141-147. Olsson, P.A.
- The Use of Pedagogic Drama in Psychiatric Education,” Journal of Medical Education, Vol. 59 (March, 1975) 299-300. Byrd, G.J. and Olsson
- “The Use of Sex Therapy in a Patient with a Penile Prosthesis,” Journal of Sex and Marital Therapy, Vol. L, No. 4 (Summer 1975): 305-311. Divita, E.C. and Olsson, P. A.,
- “Erectile Impotence Treated with an Implantable, Inflatable Prosthesis",” The Journal of the American Medical Association, Vol. 241, No. 24 (June 15, 1979): 2609-2613. Scott, F. B.., Byrd, G.J., Karacan, I., Olsson, P.A., Beutler, L.E. and Attita, S.I.
- “Psychiatric Evaluation of the Penile Implant Candidate,” in Sleep Disorders: Diagnosis and Treatment. Williams, R. and Karacan, I., Editors. New York: Wiley (1978): 395-399. Byrd, G. and Olsson, P.A., (Book Chapter 16)
- “The Expressive Arts Fields in Evaluation and Treatment,” in The Clinician's Manual of Mental Health Care: A Multi-Disciplinary Approach. Moffic, S. and Adams, G., Editors. New York: Addison-Wesley (1980). Olsson, P.A. (Chapter 13)
- “Adolescent Involvement With the Supernatural and Cults: Some Clinical, Theoretical and Applied Psychoanalytic Considerations.” The Annual of Psychoanalysis of the Chicago Institute of Psychoanalysis. Vol. VIII (1980): 171-196. Olsson, P.A.
- “New Uses of Psychodrama.” Journal of Operational Psychiatry, Vol. 114, No. 2 (1983): 96-102. Olsson, P. A. and Barth, P. A.
- “New Bottlers for Old Wine: Adolescent Involvement With the Supernatural and Cults.” In: Psychodynamic Perspectives on Religion, Sect and Cults. Halpern, D., Editor. Boston: John Wright (1983): 235-256. Olsson, P.A., (Book Chapter 14)
- “Complexities in the Psychology and Psychotherapy Of the Phenomenally Wealthy.” In Last Taboo: Money as Symbol and Reality in Psychotherapy and Psychoanalysis. Krueger, D., Editor. New York: Bruner/Mazel (1986): 55-69. Olsson, P.A. (Book Chapter 6)
- “Constructive Approaches to Counter-Transference in Couples Group Psychotherapy.” The Journal of the Houston Group Psychotherapy Society. Vol. L, No. l (September, 1986): 57-67. Olsson, P.A.
- “The Terrorist and the Terrorized: Some Psychoanalytic Considerations.” The Journal of Psychohistory. Vol. 16, No. 1 (Summer, 1988): 47-60. Olsson, P.A.
- “Psychodrama and Group Therapy Approaches to Alexithymia.” In Group Psychodynamics: New Paradigms and New Perspectives. Halperin, O. A., Editor. Chicago, London, Boca Raton: Year Book Medical Publishers (1989): 169-180. Olsson, P. A. (Book Chapter 11)
- “The Terrorist and the Terrorized.” In: The Psychodynamics of International Relationships, Vol. 1, Concepts and Theories. Volkan, V., Julius, D., and Montville, J., Editors. Lexington, MA: Heath (1990): 181-192. Olsson, P.A., (Book Chapter 14)
- “Media power: The Vietnam and Gulf Wars.” Mind and Human Interaction, Vol. 3, No. 3 (May, 1992): 85-87. Olsson, P.A.
- “Our Deepening Crisis in Collegiality,” The Psychiatric Times, Vol. X, No. 1 (January, 1993): 7.
- “Sobriety Shop - A Variation on the Magic Shop For Addiction Treatment Patients.” In: Psychotherapy, Psychodrama & Sociometry, Vol. 46, No. 1, (Spring, 1993) Rustin, T.A. and Olsson, P. A.
- “A Psychoanalytic Study of Integrity, Inner Courage and ‘Good Character’” Mind and Human interaction, Vol. 5, No. 1, (February, 1994): 34-42. Olsson, P.A.
- “In Search of Their Fathers-Themselves: Jim Jones and David Koresh” Mind and Human Interaction, Vol. 5, No. 3 (August, 1994): 85-96. Olsson, P.A.
- “Shoko Asahara: The Malignant Pied Piper of Japan.” Mind and Human Interaction, Vol. 7, No. 2 (May, 1996): 54-63. Olsson, P.A.
- “Time Compressed: Psychoanalysis in the Days of AIDS and HIV.” J. Amer. Academy of Psychoanalysis, Vol. 25, No. 2 (1997): 277-293. Olsson, P.A.
- Psychodynamics of Leaders and Decision-Making, Monograph---"Mind & Human Interaction", vol 9 #3, 1998 Olsson, P.A. with Volkan et al.
- "Cry wolf’ often: Violence prevention at the mental health clinic.” Journal of Healthcare Safety, Compliance & Infection Control, Vol. 3, No. 5, May 1999 p205-206. Olsson, P.A.
- “A Psychoanalytic Study of Integrity and ‘Good Character’”, Journal of the American Academy of Psychoanalysis Vol28#3, Fall 2000 p397-409. Olsson, P.A.
- "Grave Dangers From Bad Examples (Bullies and Arrogant "Celebrities") The Keene Sentinel March 20, 2001. Olsson, P.A.
- “Love of Community: My Experience as a Member of The Citizen Review Committee of The Houston Police Department”. Houston Psychiatric Society News, Vol. 3, Issue 6, June, 2001, pp2–4.Olsson, P.A.
- “The Mind Of Osama bin Laden : Ultimate Terror Cult Leader", Fall/Winter issueThe Academy Form -of The American Academy of Psychoanalysis, 2002. Olsson, P.A.
