= Geisel School of Medicine =

School of Dartmouth College in Hanover, New Hampshire, US

Geisel School of Medicine at Dartmouth
- Type: Private medical school
- Established: November 22, 1797
- Parent institution: Dartmouth College
- Dean: Jennifer Hunt, M.D.
- Faculty: 2,342
- Students: 734
- Location: Hanover, New Hampshire, United States; 43°42′33″N 72°17′03″W
- Campus: Rural
- Website: geiselmed.dartmouth.edu

The Geisel School of Medicine is the medical school of Dartmouth College located in Hanover, New Hampshire. The fourth oldest medical school in the United States, it was founded in 1797 by New England physician Nathan Smith as the Dartmouth Medical School. It is one of the seven Ivy League medical schools.

Several milestones in medical care and research have taken place at Dartmouth, including the introduction of stethoscopes to U.S. medical education (1838), the first clinical X-ray (1896), and the first multispecialty intensive care unit (ICU) in the United States (1955).

The Geisel School of Medicine grants the Doctor of Medicine (MD) and Doctor of Philosophy (PhD) degrees. The school has a student body of approximately 700 students and more than 2,300 faculty and researchers. Geisel organizes research through over a dozen research centers and institutes, attracting more than $140 million in grants annually, and is ranked as a top medical school by U.S. News & World Report for both primary care and biomedical research.

Geisel has numerous clinical partners, including Dartmouth Hitchcock Medical Center, White River Junction Veterans Administration Medical Center, California Pacific Medical Center, and Manchester Veterans Administration Medical Center.

== History ==
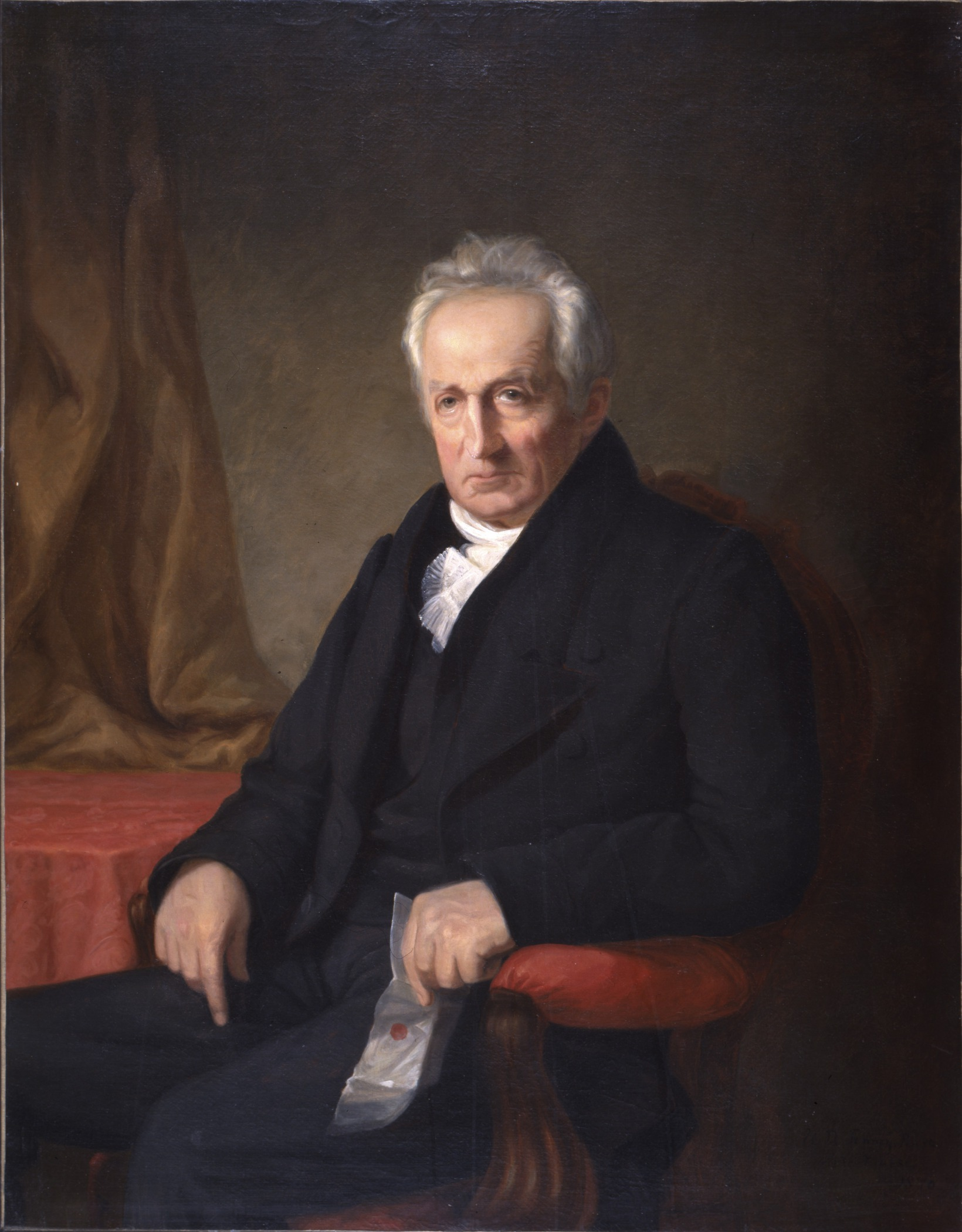
Nathan Smith, founder of Dartmouth Medical School

=== Foundation and early years ===
Dartmouth College's medical school was founded in 1797 as the fourth medical school in the United States, following the University of Pennsylvania School of Medicine (1765), the medical school of King's College (now Columbia University) (1767), and Harvard Medical School (1782). The founder was Nathan Smith, a Harvard University and University of Edinburgh Medical School educated physician from Cornish, New Hampshire. Noting the dearth of medical professionals in the rural Connecticut River Upper Valley area, Smith petitioned the Board of Trustees of Dartmouth College in August 1796 to fund the establishment of a medical school to train more physicians for the region. Though Dartmouth College as a whole was financially strapped, the Board approved the request, and Smith began lecturing on November 22, 1797.

For much of its early life, the school consisted only of Nathan Smith and a small class of students, operating in borrowed space at Dartmouth College. Students of Smith were educated as apprentices, and received a Bachelor of Medicine degree upon graduation. Like Dartmouth College as a whole, the medical school had continual funding shortages. As time passed, however, the popularity of both the medical instruction and the basic sciences taught at the school drew undergraduates and training physicians alike. Soliciting funds from the state of New Hampshire, Smith was able to obtain medical equipment and, by 1811, a dedicated physical plant for the school.

Smith acted as the sole administrator and instructor of the medical school until 1810 when a second faculty member was hired. Smith also revamped the curriculum, allowing the school to begin offering the Doctor of Medicine (M.D.) degree in 1812. Smith ultimately left Dartmouth in 1816, founding three additional schools of medicine at Yale University, Bowdoin College, and the University of Vermont.

=== Expansion ===
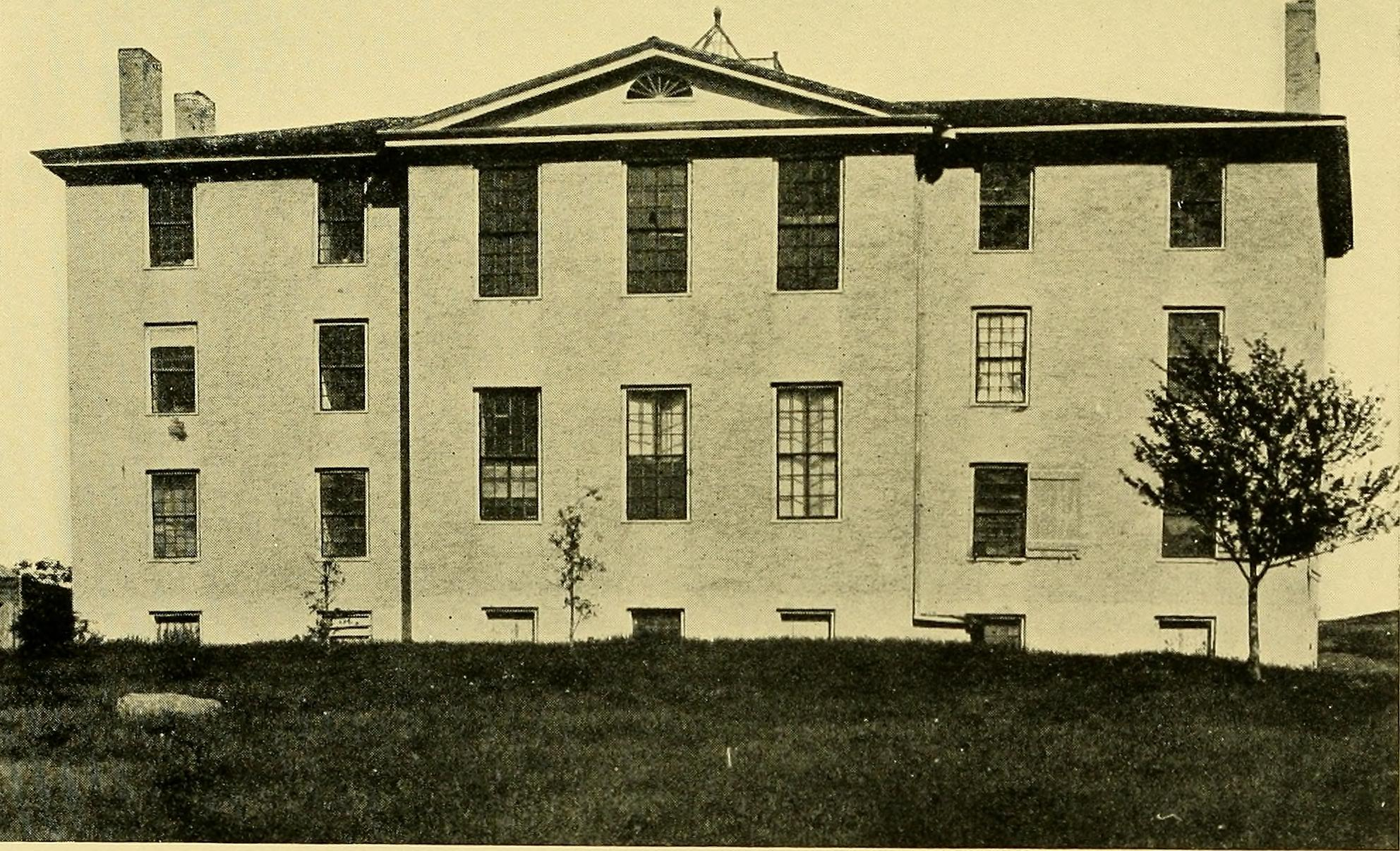
In 1811, Dartmouth constructed the first building in the United States devoted to medical education. The structure served as the school's primary facility for more than 150 years

Smith's departure provided for a period of expansion, both among the faculty and the student body. Former students of Nathan Smith's replaced him on the faculty, drawing medical professionals in the northeast such as Oliver Wendell Holmes Sr. to join them. The first hospital at the school was founded by DMS alumnus Dixi Crosby in 1838, who used it to integrate academic instruction with hands-on patient care. In 1870, Carlton Pennington Frost, DMS '57, replaced Crosby as Dean of the school. Under Frost, the curriculum sustained another revamping, this time into a four-year program that included clinical and academic training. Frost also presided over the establishment of Mary Hitchcock Memorial Hospital in 1893, built to replace Crosby's defunct hospital.

In 1908, The Carnegie Foundation for the Advancement of Teaching conducted a survey of medical education institutions in the United States. At the time, the discipline emphasized "bedside teaching" and providing students experience with a broad variety of illnesses and patients. The school's rural location was deemed too remote for proper clinical training, and the school was advised to stop offering the Doctor of Medicine degree and only provide pre-clinical instruction. The class of 1914 was the last (until 1974) to receive the Doctor of Medicine degree; subsequent classes of students attended DMS for two years before transferring to other medical schools. The drop of clinical instruction worsened the school's problems by driving away talented faculty members.

After World War II, the tide of the medical discipline had shifted towards research. Although the school was well regarded for preparing students for clinical education at other institutions, its faculty was criticized for its apparent disinterest in research. The school was also criticized for using Dartmouth College's undergraduate program as a feeder school. Based on these criticisms, DMS was placed on "confidential probation" in 1956 by the Association of American Medical Colleges and the Council on Medical Education.

=== "Refounding" ===
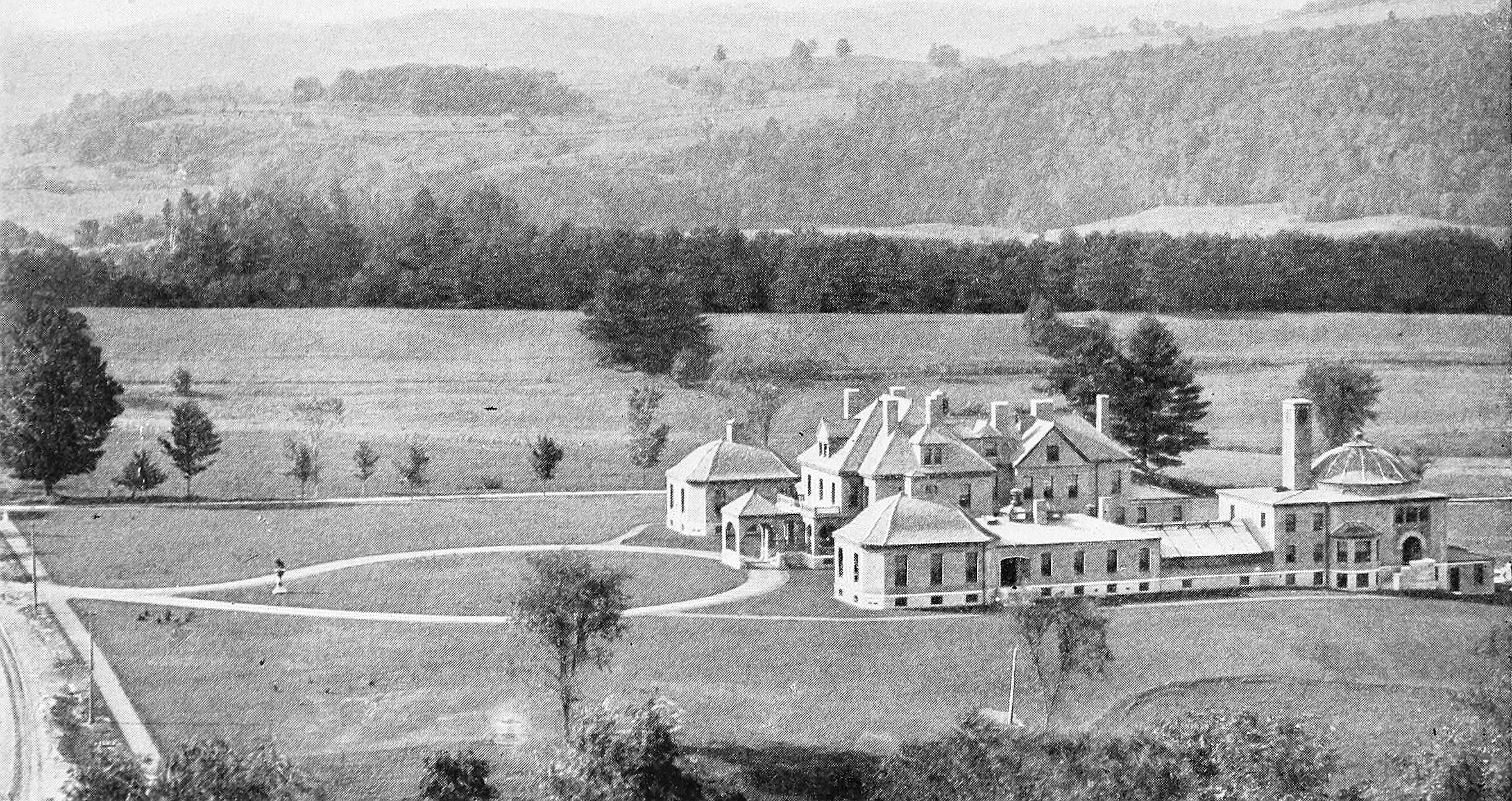
Mary Hitchcock Memorial Hospital c. 1887

At the time of the probation, Dartmouth College had already anticipated the medical school's plight, amassing capital to fund a revitalization of the school. In 1956, the trustees of the college formally agreed to a "refounding" of the school's academic offerings, physical facilities, and faculty. S. Marsh Tenney, DMS class of 1944, was appointed to carry out this task. Tenney more than doubled the size of the faculty and the student body, added several new departments, and oversaw the construction of five new campus buildings by 1964.

In the 1960s, due to a national shortage of physicians and government incentives for schools that increased their class sizes, Dartmouth Medical School graduates began to experience difficulty in trying to transfer to other medical schools to complete their final two years of medical school as other medical schools had increased their class size and could not accommodate transfer students. In the meantime, Mary Hitchcock Memorial Hospital had grown to be a 400-bed medical center, and Dartmouth Medical School had established a partnership with a 224-bed Veterans Administration Hospital in White River Junction, Vermont. The Doctor of Medicine program, now possible with the expanded local medical centers, was reinstated by a vote of the trustees in 1968. The admission of M.D. candidates resumed in 1970. Initially, the medical school curriculum was three years in length, unlike most medical schools, but it later was increased to the usual four years in 1979.

A cooperative program with Brown Medical School began in 1981 where students received training at both medical schools. Fifteen to twenty students were selected for the program, which combined the first two years of basic science coursework at Dartmouth with the final two years of clinical coursework at Brown. The program balanced Dartmouth's greater basic science facilities than Brown, but fewer clinical facilities than available at the urban setting of Brown, which is located in Providence, Rhode Island. Graduates of the program received M.D. degrees from Brown. The program was discontinued in 2010.

=== Dartmouth-Hitchcock Medical Center ===
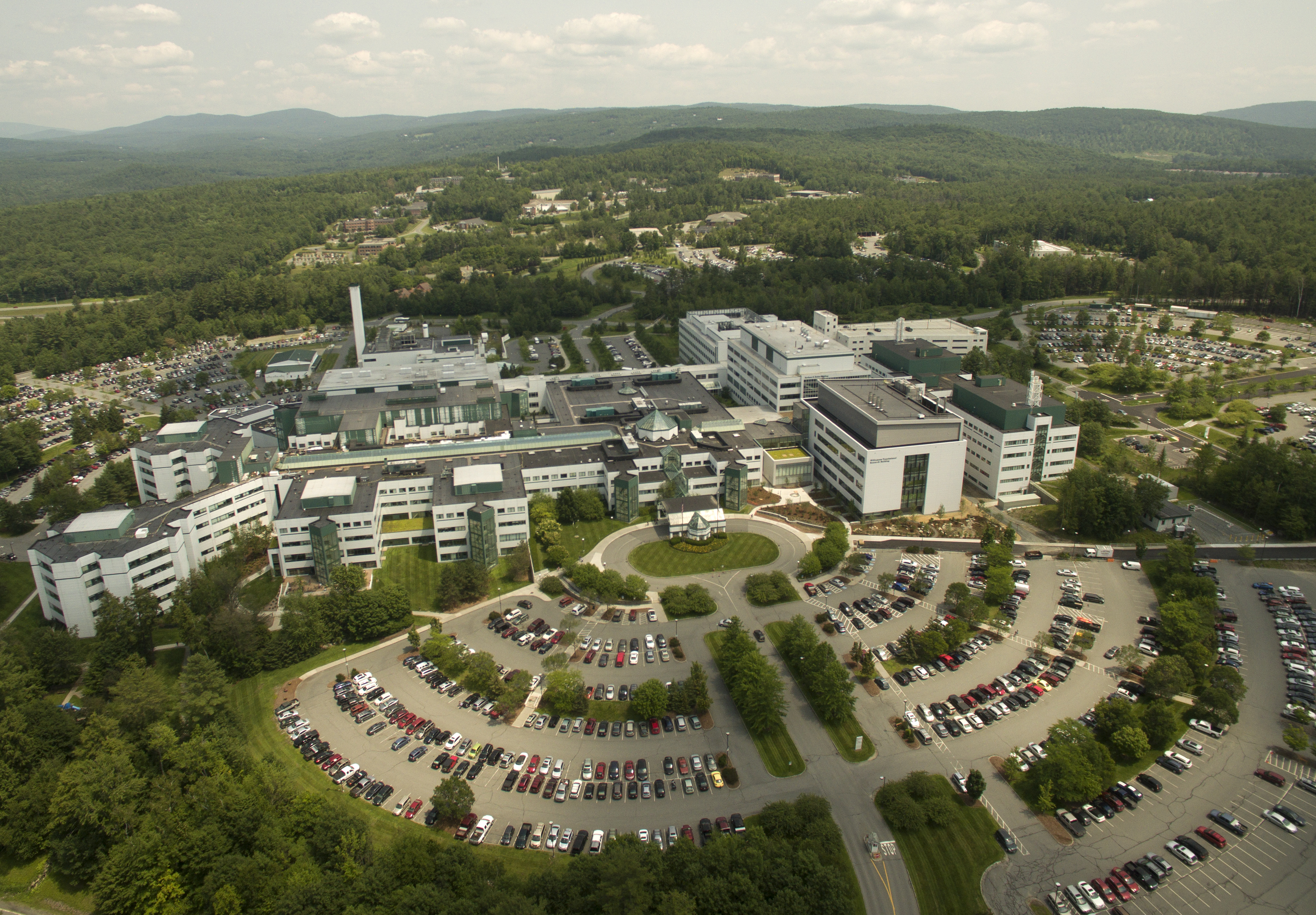
Dartmouth-Hitchcock Medical Center

In 1991, the Dartmouth-Hitchcock Medical Center was established on a 225-acre (0.91 km^{2}) campus in Lebanon, New Hampshire. The three-year project, completed at the cost of $228 million, served as a replacement for the Mary Hitchcock Memorial Hospital, which was partially demolished in the early 1990s. A new curriculum was introduced in 1996 entitled "New Directions." The curriculum, still in place today, seeks to promote small classes, reduce the amount of lectures, and offer students extensive interactive experience with patients. 2009 saw the successful completion of a $250 million capital campaign.

On April 4, 2012, the Dartmouth Medical School was renamed the Audrey and Theodor Geisel School of Medicine in honor of their many years of generosity to the college.

== Facilities ==
The Geisel School of Medicine has facilities on the campus of Dartmouth College, which is situated in the Upper Valley town of Hanover, New Hampshire, as well at the hospital campus of Dartmouth-Hitchcock Medical Center in Lebanon, New Hampshire.

The medical school facilities at Dartmouth College sit in a complex on the north end of Dartmouth's campus and includes academic, administrative, research, and presentation facilities. Geisel School of Medicine is served by two libraries, the Dana Biomedical Library and the Matthews-Fuller Health Sciences Library, which together offer over 240,000 volumes. Off-campus housing is available through Dartmouth College. In addition, the Class of 1978 Life Sciences Center was completed in August 2011 at a cost of $92 million.

Dartmouth-Hitchcock Medical Center, in nearby Lebanon, New Hampshire, is the primary affiliated teaching hospital of the Geisel School of Medicine. The 531-bed inpatient facility acts as the medical school's teaching hospital and main teaching site. Other constituent elements include the Dartmouth-Hitchcock Clinic (a network of physicians in Vermont and New Hampshire) and a Veterans Affairs Medical Center in White River Junction, Vermont. In total, Dartmouth-Hitchcock Medical Center serves an area with a population of 1.6 million.

In addition to on-campus instruction in Hanover and Lebanon, third- and fourth-year students may choose from 75 regional sites for their clerkships. Most clerkship facilities are located in central New England, although students are also able to clerk at sites in Alaska, Arizona, California, New Mexico, and Florida.

- Dartmouth-Hitchcock Medical Center
- Veterans Affairs Medical Center, White River Junction, Vermont
- California Pacific Medical Center
- Children’s Hospital of Orange County
- Santa Clara Valley Medical Center
- Mayo Clinic Florida
- Hartford Hospital
- Concord Hospital
- Alice Peck Day Hospital
- Dartmouth-Hitchcock Manchester
- Southern New Hampshire Regional Medical Center
- Cheshire Medical Center
- Fort Defiance Indian Hospital, Arizona
- Monadnock Community Hospital

== Academics ==
Geisel School of Medicine Departments
Academic Departments
- Anesthesiology
- Biochemistry and Cell Biology
- Biomedical Data Science
- Community and Family Medicine
- Epidemiology
- Health Policy & Clinical Practice (The Dartmouth Institute)
- Medical Education
- Medicine
- Microbiology and Immunology
- Molecular and Systems Biology
- Neurology
- Obstetrics and Gynecology
- Orthopaedics
- Pathology and Laboratory Medicine
- Pediatrics
- Psychiatry
- Radiology
- Surgery

=== Degree programs ===
The Geisel School of Medicine offers the four-year Doctor of Medicine (MD) degree and the Doctor of Philosophy (PhD) degree in certain fields.

There are six PhD programs based in the Geisel School of Medicine: pharmacology and toxicology, molecular and cell biology, immunology, molecular pathogenesis, systems biology, and experimental and molecular medicine. Research and teaching positions at the Geisel School of Medicine and its centers and institutes are available to PhD candidates.

In addition to the MD degree, Geisel medical students participate in the following joint-degree programs at Dartmouth:

- MD/PhD program with the Guarini School of Graduate and Advanced Studies at Dartmouth
- MD/MBA program with the Tuck School of Business at Dartmouth
- MD/MPH and MD/MS programs with the Geisel School of Medicine
- MD/MS program with the Thayer School of Engineering at Dartmouth

==== Health Sciences Masters Programs ====
- Master of Public Health (On-Campus, Hybrid, or Online)
- Master of Science in Epidemiology (On-Campus)
- Master of Science in Healthcare Research (On-Campus)
- Master of Science in Health Data Science (On-Campus or Online)
- Master of Science in Implementation Science (Online)
- Master of Science in Medical Informatics (On-Campus)
- Master of Healthcare Delivery Sciences with the Tuck School of Business
- Master of Health Administration with the Tuck School of Business
- Master of Public Health and Master of Business Administration (MPH-MBA) with the Tuck School of Business

==== PhD - Graduate Education ====
- PhD - Biomedical Sciences with the Guarini School of Graduate and Advanced Students
- PhD - Health Policy and Clinical Practice with the Dartmouth Institute of Health Policy and Clinical Practice
- PhD - Quantitative Biomedical Sciences

=== Curriculum ===
The MD curriculum spans four years, combining required courses with electives. First-year students learn human anatomy and basic biomedical science in classes offered by the basic science departments, while beginning a 1.5-year course of study in clinical studies.

Second-year students study pathophysiology and take courses from almost every clinical and basic science department in the school. In their third year, students are required to participate in six eight-week medical clerkships with area medical institutions, covering both ambulatory clinics and hospitals.

The final year is spent on additional clerkships, the designation of an area of focus, and preparation for a post-graduation residency. In addition to imparting medical and clinical knowledge, the MD program is designed to teach interpersonal and communications skills, professionalism, and other practical skills for a medical career.

=== Admissions ===
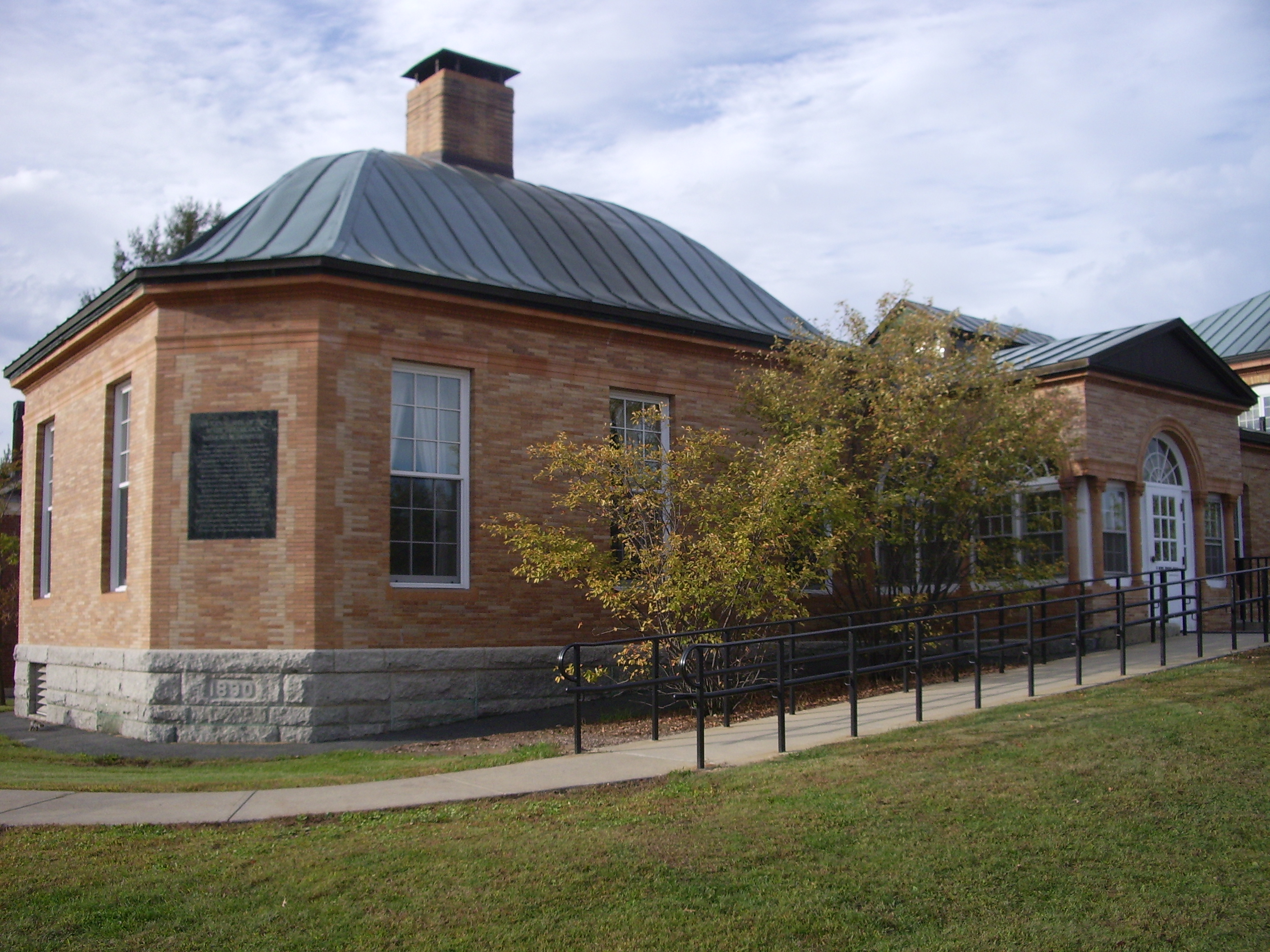
3 Rope Ferry Road, location of Geisel School of Medicine's Office of Admissions.

Admission to the MD program at the Geisel School of Medicine is highly selective. Geisel receives approximately 7,000 applications each year for about 92 places in the entering class. In 2025, the acceptance rate was 1.27%

The Geisel School of Medicine is ranked in Tier 1 in U.S. News & World Report's 2026 best medical schools for primary care.

In 2021, the Liaison Committee for Medical Education (LCME) granted the Geisel School of Medicine a full eight-year term of accreditation, the longest available.

=== Organization ===
Similar to Dartmouth College, the Geisel School of Medicine operates on a quarter system. The school is directly managed by a Dean who is advised by a 22-member Board of Overseers. Part of the larger institution, the Geisel School of Medicine is ultimately administered by Dartmouth's president and Board of Trustees. As of the 2008–2009 academic year, the school operates on a budget of $237 million.

=== Research and publications ===
Besides research conducted within the infrastructure of academic departments, research at Geisel is also organized around over a dozen research centers and institutes. The centers cover various medical subjects such as neuroscience, oncology (Dartmouth Cancer Center), psychiatry, and pediatrics. Funded research at Geisel School of Medicine amounted to $140 million during the 2012–2013 academic year.

The medical school publishes a magazine, Dartmouth Medicine. In addition, the school also publishes an innovative medical literary journal, Lifelines (literary journal).

== People ==
=== Student profile and student life ===
The Geisel School of Medicine's enrollment as of October 2013 totaled 700 students: 360 M.D. candidates and 340 graduate students. In addition to the student body, over 350 resident physicians and research fellows were on campus as of July 2007. The student population is split approximately evenly between men and women, while about 25 percent of the student body is made up of international or minority students. From an average class size of 75, over 60 undergraduate institutions and most of the U.S. states are represented. According to The Princeton Review, the small class size at Geisel helps to establish "a strong sense of community and collaborative spirit." The school offers dozens of community service, recreational, professional, and other student groups.

=== Faculty ===
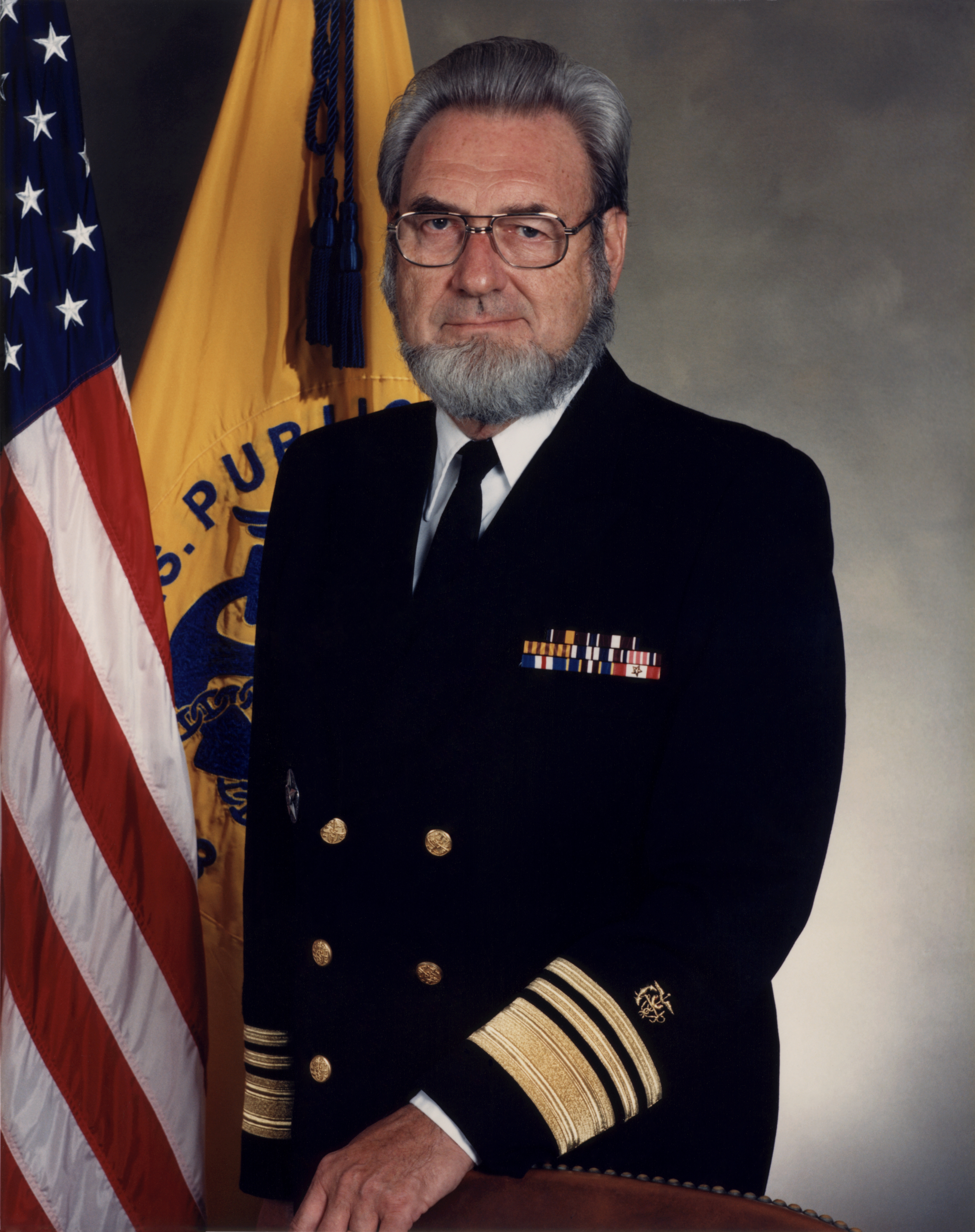
C. Everett Koop, who served as a Senior Scholar of the C. Everett Koop Institute at the Geisel School

As of November 2007, the Geisel School of Medicine employs a staff of 2,315 faculty and researchers: 766 full-time faculty, 1,301 part-time faculty and non-faculty instructors, and 248 research positions. The ratio of full-time, on-site faculty to students is given by the school as 2:1. Notable current faculty include Stuart Gitlow, palliative care physician Ira Byock, former astronaut and Democratic politician Jay C. Buckey, psychoanalyst Peter A. Olsson, and Jay Dunlap, professor and chair of genetics at the Dartmouth Geisel School of Medicine and a member of the National Academy of Sciences. Notable former faculty include biochemist Mahlon Hoagland, pathologist and geneticist Kurt Benirschke, and former Surgeon General of the United States C. Everett Koop.

=== Notable alumni ===
There are 4,891 living graduates of the Geisel School of Medicine as of June 2013.

- Samuel Ford McGill, first black student to graduate from a U.S. medical school
- Charles Knowlton, freethinker jailed briefly for providing sex education
- Robert O. Blood, physician
- John G. Gunderson (combined Harvard program), "father of borderline personality disorder"
- John D. Bullock, ophthalmologist and epidemiologist
- John Francis Eisold, attending physician at the United States Capitol
- Calvin Johnson, anesthesiologist and health advocate
- Robert E. Michler, heart surgeon and Surgeon-in-Chief at Montefiore Medical Center and Albert Einstein College of Medicine
- Richard S. Molony, U.S. Representative
- Robert Burns, U.S. Representative
- Noah Martin, Governor of New Hampshire
- Ian Smith, television personality
- Anne Schuchat, Principal Deputy Director of the Centers for Disease Control and Prevention
- William E. Flanary (Dr. Glaucomflecken), ophthalmologist and comedian
