= First Descents =

American non-profit organization

- Founded: 2001
- Founder: Brad Ludden
- Type: Nonprofit
- Purpose: Humanitarian
- Location: Denver, Colorado, U.S.
- Region served: United States, Costa Rica, Peru, Vietnam, Patagonia, and Bali
- Product: Outdoor adventures for cancer fighters
- Key people: Ryan O'Donoghue (Executive Director)
- Revenue: $1,906,780 (2012)
- Employees: 11–50
- Website: FirstDescents.org

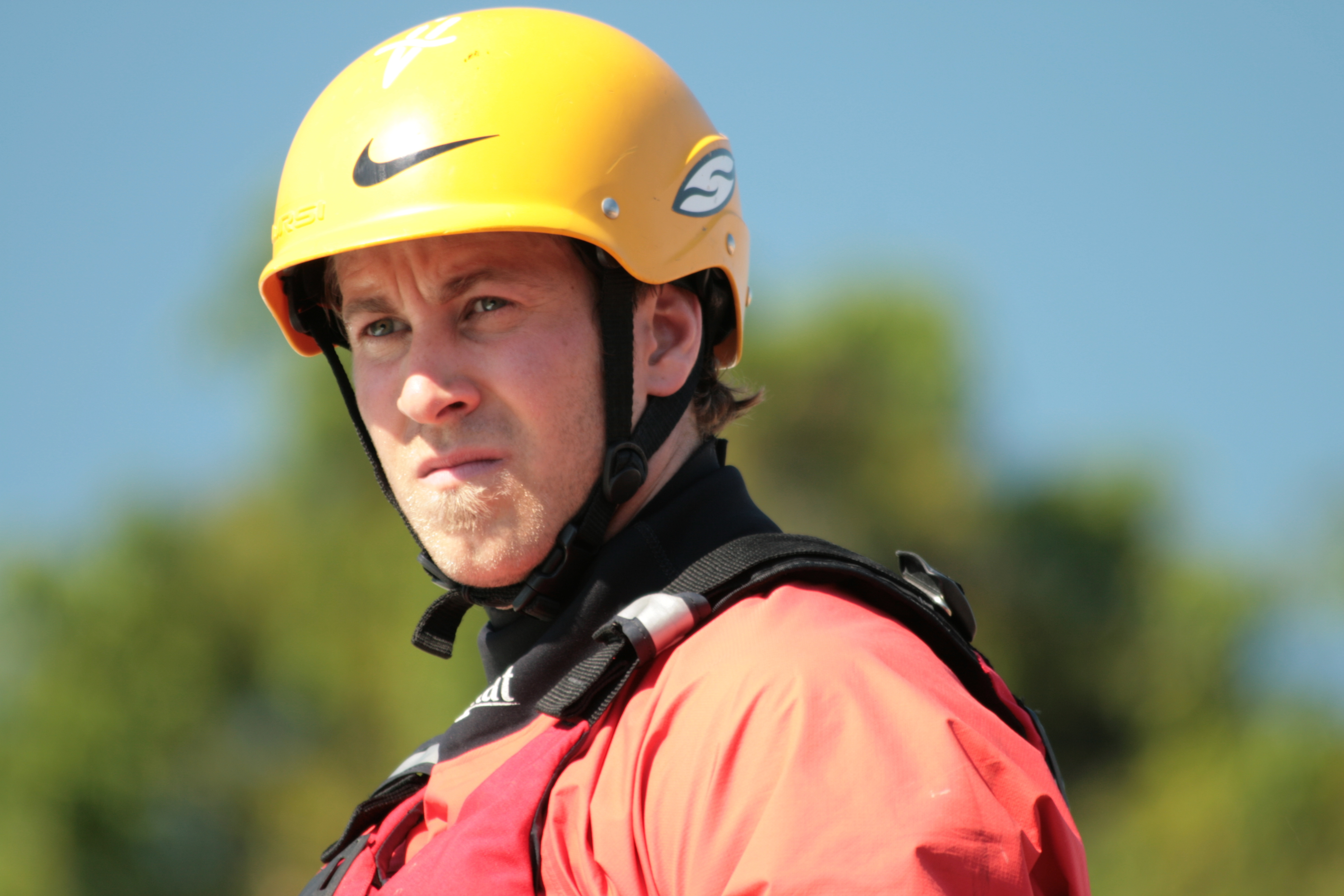
Brad Ludden on the '4,000 islands' section of the Mekong river in Laos

First Descents (FD) is a charitable non-profit organization headquartered in Denver, Colorado. Brad Ludden, a professional kayaker, founded First Descents in 2001.

First Descents has served around 10,000 young adult survivors at over 1,000 programs nationwide. First Descents has been recognized by CNN Heroes and Outside magazine's Best Places to Work.

== History ==
When Brad Ludden was 12, and his 38-year-old aunt was diagnosed with breast cancer, he decided to volunteer at a local pediatric oncology program and teach kayaking. In 2001, he started First Descents.

In 2016, Ludden won the CNN Hero Award for his work with First Descents.

In 2020, First Descents expanded programming to serve healthcare professionals on the frontlines of COVID-19.

== Programs ==
First Descents provides week-long and multi-day programs nationwide. The programs offer climbing, paddling, and surfing.

In 2011, First Descents offered 27 outdoor programs, and 283 people participated. In 2012, the number of outdoor programs grew to 45, and the number of participants was 515. In 2013, First Descents ran programs in 12 states and three countries.

== Out Living It documentary ==
First Descents founder Brad Ludden approached filmmaker Michael Brown, a three-time Emmy Award winner, about directing a documentary about Ludden's adventures with cancer survivors. First Descents launched a Kickstarter campaign to fund the documentary and raised $21,507.

Ludden and 14 other young adult cancer survivors spent a week together in the outdoors. Brown filmed the adventures and interviewed the participants. The film was released on April 14, 2012.
