= HCA =

HCA may refer to:

== Courts ==
- High Court of Australia, the supreme court in the Australian court hierarchy and the final court of appeal in Australia

== Organizations ==
=== Europe ===
- Hall–Carpenter Archives, an archive of materials related to gay activism in Britain
- School of History, Classics and Archaeology, a department at the University of Edinburgh in Scotland
- Heidelberg Center for American Studies, an institute at Heidelberg University, Germany
- Helsinki Citizens' Assembly, a nongovernmental organization dedicated to peace, democracy and human rights in Europe
- Heritage Crafts Association, a UK charity that helps to preserve traditional hand crafts
- Homes and Communities Agency, a UK non-departmental public body

=== United States ===
- HCA Healthcare, an operator of health care facilities
- Heritage Christian Academy (disambiguation), several private Christian schools:
  - Heritage Christian Academy (Fort Collins, Colorado)
  - Heritage Christian Academy (Texas)
  - Heritage Christian Academy (Kansas)
  - Heritage Christian Academy (Minnesota)
  - Heritage Christian Academy (New Jersey)
- Hollywood Critics Association, a film critic group in Los Angeles, California
- Hopkins Consulting Agency, a student-run technology consulting company at The Johns Hopkins University
- Hydaburg Cooperative Association, federally recognized Alaska Native tribe

=== Other organizations ===
- Hillcrest Christian Academy, an independent primary school in South Africa
- Holy Child Academy, a Catholic school in Pagadian City, Philippines

== Science and technology ==
- Heterocyclic amine, a type of chemical compound containing at least one heterocyclic ring
- Hexachloroacetone, an organic compound also called hexachloropropanone or perchloroacetone
- Hierarchical cluster analysis, a method of cluster analysis used in data mining
- High content analysis, a laboratory microscopic technique
- Host channel adapter, in electronic communications
- Hydroxycitric acid
- Holloway Cut Advisor, a method of rating brilliant cut diamonds
- Hot Cranking Amps, a measurement of the current provided by a car battery
- Hydrographic Commission on Antarctica

== Other uses ==
- HCA (classification), a para-cycling classification
- Hans Christian Andersen, Danish author
- Big Spring McMahon–Wrinkle Airport with the IATA code HCA
- Healthcare Assistant, a UK name for a job class of medical paraprofessionals
- Hennepin Center for the Arts, a building in Minneapolis, Minnesota, US
- Historical cost accounting
