= Heritage Christian Academy =

Heritage Christian Academy is the name of several private Christian schools in the United States and Canada:

- Heritage Christian Academy (Calgary)
- Heritage Christian Academy (Colorado)
- Heritage Christian Academy (Texas)
- Heritage Christian Academy (Kansas)
- Heritage Christian Academy (Minnesota)
- Heritage Christian Academy (New Jersey)
