= List of Johns Hopkins University student organizations =

Johns Hopkins University has over 500 student-run organizations. The University Office of Leadership Engagement & Experiential Development (LEED) is the hub for all undergraduate and graduate student organizations on the Homewood Campus at JHU. A comprehensive list of all student organizations, inclusive of all nine schools at JHU can be found on Hopkins Groups.

== Fraternity and sorority life ==
The university recognizes ten fraternities, fourteen sororities, and two co-educational professional fraternities. In the fall of 2023, fifteen percent of undergraduate male students belonged to a fraternity and sixteen percent of undergraduate females belonged to a sorority. Fraternities and sororities have been a part of the university culture since 1877, when Beta Theta Pi fraternity became the first to form a chapter on campus. Sororities arrived at JHU in 1976. As with all of the university's programs, discrimination based on "marital status, pregnancy, race, color, ethnicity, national origin, age, disability, religion, sexual orientation, veteran status" is prohibited. JHU also has an anti-hazing policy and prohibits alcohol at recruitment activities. Hopkins does not permit "city-wide" chapters and requires all members of a JHU-recognized fraternity or sorority to be a JHU student.

As of spring 2021, 1,208 students were members of one of Hopkins' fraternities or sororities. The All–FSL Average GPA was 3.84, above the undergraduate average GPA. In spring 2010, the university was considering the construction of a "fraternity row" of houses to consolidate the groups on campus.

All Johns Hopkins, fraternities and sororities belong to one of three councils: the Inter-Fraternity Council, the National Panhellenic Conference, and the Intercultural Greek Council which combines the National Pan-Hellenic Council and the Multicultural Council. Additionally, four independent chapters report directly to Fraternity and Sorority Life which is a unit of JHU's Leadership Engagement & Experiential Development.

Many of the fraternities maintain houses off campus, but no sororities do. Baltimore City allows the housing to be zoned specifically for use as a fraternity or sorority house, but in practice, this zoning code has not been awarded for at least 50 years. Only Sigma Phi Epsilon's building has this zoning code due to its consistent ownership since the 1920s.

=== Inter-Fraternity Council ===
The Inter-Fraternity Council includes seven fraternities:

- ΑΕΠ – Alpha Epsilon Pi fraternity, Psi chapter founded 1936. Jewish interest
- ΒΘΠ – Beta Theta Pi fraternity, Alpha Chi chapter founded 1877
- ΦΔΘ – Phi Delta Theta fraternity, Maryland Delta chapter founded 2009
- ΦΓΔ – Phi Gamma Delta fraternity, Beta Mu chapter founded 1891
- ΦΚΨ – Phi Kappa Psi fraternity, Maryland Alpha chapter founded 1879
- ΣΧ – Sigma Chi fraternity, Kappa Upsilon chapter founded 2004
- ΣΦΕ – Sigma Phi Epsilon fraternity, Maryland Alpha chapter founded 1929

=== National Panhellenic Conference ===
The National Panhellenic Conference includes five sororities

- ΑΦ – Alpha Phi sorority, Zeta Omicron chapter, founded 1982
- ΚΚΓ – Kappa Kappa Gamma sorority, Eta Epsilon chapter, founded 1999
- ΦΜ – Phi Mu sorority, Gamma Tau chapter, founded 1982
- ΠΒΦ – Pi Beta Phi sorority, Maryland Gamma, chartered November 20, 2010
- ΚΑΘ – Kappa Alpha Theta sorority, Zeta Chi chapter, founded April 20, 1997, disbanded April 14, 2009, reorganized March 1, 2014 (Note: Kappa Alpha Theta was disbanded by its national headquarters on April 14, 2009, after twelve years on campus. The removal was due to repeated risk management violations. Theta was reorganized on March 1, 2014.)

=== Intercultural Greek Council ===
The Intercultural Greek Council includes the following ten organizations represented by the National Pan–Hellenic Council and the Multicultural Council.

==== National Pan-Hellenic Council ====
The National Pan–Hellenic Council includes five historically African–American groups:

- ΔΣΘ – Delta Sigma Theta sorority, Mu Psi chapter chartered 1976
- ΑΚΑ – Alpha Kappa Alpha sorority, Xi Tau chapter chartered 1976
- ΑΦΑ – Alpha Phi Alpha fraternity, Sigma Sigma chapter founded 1991
- ΣΓΡ – Sigma Gamma Rho sorority, Rho Omega chapter founded 2009
- ΚΑΨ – Kappa Alpha Psi fraternity, Rho Upsilon Chapter chartered 2019

==== Multicultural Council ====
The Multicultural Council includes five groups:

- αΚΔΦ – alpha Kappa Delta Phi sorority, Asian–American interest, associate chapter founded 1997 (Note: αΚΔΦ sorority uses four Greek letters in its name, and the first letter, Alpha, is rendered in lower case.)
- ΔΞΦ – Delta Xi Phi sorority, Multicultural interest, Lambda chapter founded 2003
- ΛΠΧ – Latinas Promoviendo Comunidad Lambda Pi Chi sorority, Sigma chapter charted 2004
- ΛΥΛ – Lambda Upsilon Lambda fraternity, Phi chapter charted in 1995
- ΣΙΑ – Hermandad de Sigma Iota Alpha Incorporada, Beta Zeta chapter founded 2014
- ΣΟΠ – Sigma Omicron Pi sorority, Asian–American interest, Lambda chapter founded 2002

=== Independent ===
These four independent organizations are recognized at the university under its Fraternity and Sorority Life division.

- ΙΧ Society, primarily for women, founded in 2009
- ΔΦ – Delta Phi Fraternity (also known as St. Elmo's), Xi chapter founded in 1885
- ΑΚΨ – Alpha Kappa Psi business fraternity, Rho Psi chapter founded 2001
- ΘΤ– Theta Tau engineering fraternity

== Honor and professional societies ==
The university is home to several professional fraternities, societies, and honor organizations.

- ΑΚΨ – Alpha Kappa Psi business fraternity, Rho Psi chapter founded 2001
- ΑΦΩ - Alpha Phi Omega National Service Fraternity, Kappa Mu chapter founded 1952, rechartered 1998
- ΒΒΒ – Beta Beta Beta biology honor society, Rho Phi chapter
- ΛΕΜ – Lambda Epsilon Mu Latino pre-med honor society
- ΝΡΨ – Nu Rho Psi neuroscience honor society
- ΣΙΡ – Sigma Iota Rho international studies honor society, Gamma Chi chapter
- SHPE – Society of Hispanic Professional Engineers
- ΤΒΠ - Tau Beta Pi The Engineering Honor Society, Maryland Alpha chapter
- ΘΤ – Theta Tau engineering fraternity, Theta Delta chapter, established 2011

== Student publications ==
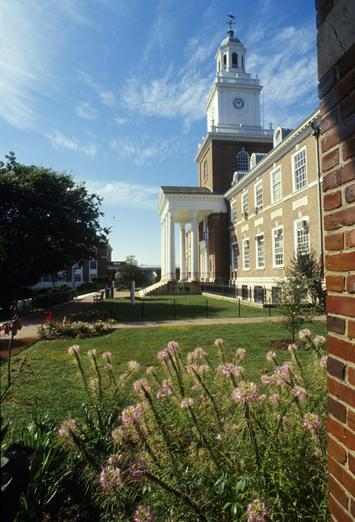
Gilman Hall, Center for the Humanities

Hopkins has many student publications.

=== Newspapers and newsletters ===
- The Johns Hopkins News-Letter, founded in 1896, is one of the oldest continuously published weekly college newspapers in the nation with a press run of 5,200. The News-Letter won an Associated Collegiate Press National Pacemaker Award for four–year, non–daily college newspapers in 2007
- Perspectives is the official newsletter of the Black Student Union.
- The Carrollton Record was a political newspaper with an American conservative perspective on campus and citywide politics. It is now defunct.
- The Hopkins Donkey was a political newspaper with a Democratic perspective on international, national, and statewide political topics. It is now defunct.

=== Magazines ===
- The Black & Blue Jay is among the nation's oldest campus humor magazines. It was founded in 1920. According to The Johns Hopkins News–Letter, the magazine's name led the newspaper to first use the moniker Blue Jays to refer to a Hopkins athletic team in 1923. While the magazine enjoyed popularity among students, it received repeated opposition from the university administration, reportedly for its vulgar humor. In October 1934, Dean Edward R. Berry removed financial support for the magazine; without funding, the magazine continued under the name The Blue Jay until Berry threatened to expel the editors in 1939. The magazine had a revival in 1984 and has appeared intermittently since then.
- Frame of Reference is an annual magazine that focuses on film and film culture
- The Politik Press is a weekly magazine published by JHU Politik, founded in 2008 as the university's only bi-partisan political publication The Politik Press contains student-written op-eds and interviews with professors, professionals, and experts in various political fields. Every semester JHU Politik publishes a special issue to highlight diverse perspectives on singular topics.
- Thoroughfare, Zeniada, and j.mag are the university's literary magazines

=== Journals ===
- Américas is the Latin American Studies journal
- Argot is the undergraduate anthropology journal
- Epidemic Proportions is the university's public health research journal, designed to highlight JHU research and fieldwork in public health. Combining research and scholarship, the journal seeks to capture the breadth and depth of the JHU undergraduate public health experience.
- The New Diplomat is a multi-disciplinary international relations journal. Foundations is the undergraduate history journal
- Prometheus is an undergraduate philosophy journal
- The Triple Helix is the university's journal about science, law, and society

== Student–run businesses ==
Hopkins Student Enterprises (HSE) is a venture capital fund and umbrella organization to foster innovation and facilitate resources and mentorship to student entrepreneurs. Current businesses that are in operation are as follows:

- Blue Jay Bay — Service for all Hopkins students to buy and sell gently used furniture.
- HopJays — Student DJ booking platform for campus and private events.
- Blue Jay Boxes — Care package and cake delivery business for Charles Village and the surrounding neighborhoods.
- Blue Jay Cleaners — Student janitorial service for all on-campus and select off-campus residence halls.
- The Complete Dorm Room — Dorm essential delivery service with over 130 items to choose from including everything from linens to printers.
- Hop and Shake — Health food kiosk located in the Ralph S. O'Connor Recreation Center.
- Hopkins Consulting Agency (HCA) — Business and technology consulting company that prepares technology commercialization reports and business plans.
- Hopkins Creative Design (HCD) — Full-service graphic design company.
- Hopkins Student Movers (HSM) — Moving and storage company that serves JHU faculty, staff, and students and the broader Baltimore community.
- Hopkins Printer Ink Delivery Service — Printer ink delivery for Homewood and surrounding Charles Village.

== Programming boards ==
In addition to the many clubs that exist on campus, there are a set of groups that are directly advised by the LEED office to run major activities and events on campus including:

- The HOP - The Hopkins Organization for Programming is a group responsible for a continuous stream of on-campus events. They also are known to co-sponsor other groups' events to help bring other groups' visions to life when the HOP has more resources at their disposal than most groups.

== Symposiums ==
- The Foreign Affairs Symposium has hosted a speaker series for the student body since 1998, with past speakers including Edward Snowden, Gloria Steinem, and Cornel West.
- The Milton S. Eisenhower Symposium is a student-run lecture series at the Johns Hopkins University. It was established in 1967.
- The Osler Medical Symposium is a student-run speaker series established in 2018 to bridge the divide between those making decisions in medicine and those affected by these decisions. Notable past symposia include Dr. Leana Wen, former Baltimore City Commissioner of Health and current President of Planned Parenthood; Dr. Paul B. Rothman, Dean/CEO of Johns Hopkins Medicine; Dr. Joshua Sharfstein, former Principal Deputy Commissioner of the Food and Drug Administration and former Baltimore Commissioner of Health; Dr. Peter Beilenson, former Baltimore City Commissioner of Health and current Sacramento County Commissioner of Health; and Dr. Peter Agre, Nobel Prize Winner in Chemistry.

== Additional student organizations ==
- Blue Jay Racing, or Hopkins Baja, is the premier undergraduate engineering team at Johns Hopkins University. Student team members take part in designing, building, and racing a single-seat off-road vehicle against approximately 200 teams representing university engineering programs from 14 nations. The award-winning program, founded in 2004, offers young engineers an educational experience that goes beyond what the classroom can offer. In addition to technical knowledge gained during the design/build process, students also learn critical team-building skills which will be extremely important in the development of each individual’s ability to become leaders in academia and/or industry. Due to their placement across all three competitions in 2023, the team finished as the sixth overall team, one of their best finishes ever.
- Since 1918, the Johns Hopkins University Barnstormers (originally known as the dramatics club) has been performing various works on campus. In their current set-up, they put on five shows a year. Two MainStage productions (a fall play and a spring musical) as well as a spring cabaret, an intersession show, and a series of one-acts performed by freshmen. They will be celebrating their 100th anniversary in the 2018-2019 school year.
- Johns Hopkins also has a variety of performing arts groups, including the illustrious Hopkins Symphony Orchestra (HSO). The orchestra performs time honored classics and newly commissioned works. Hopkins students and Baltimore community members are led by the esteemed maestro Jed Gaylin. HSO performs five concerts a year at Shriver Hall, including a family-oriented concert. The Hopkins Concert Orchestra (HCO), led by maestro Michael Djabarov, is a smaller ensemble for symphonic repertoire. HCO performs two concerts a year at the Interfaith Center.
- Johns Hopkins Undergraduate Debate Council, or JHUDC, has been the premier debate team representing Johns Hopkins since 1884. JHUDC primarily competes in American Parliamentary Debate and British Parliamentary Debate. In 2008, JHUDC placed first in the American Parliamentary Debate's Team of the Year standings. Since then, Johns Hopkins has consistently placed in the top 10 universities in the American Parliamentary Debate. In 2015, JHUDC debaters Juliana Vigorito & David Israel won the North American Debating Championship. In 2023 JHUDC placed second in the American Parliamentary Debate's national championship. JHUDC debaters were finalists in the US Universities Debating Championship that same year. Additionally, Johns Hopkins annually hosts a novice debate tournament for first-year collegiate debaters.
- Since 1972, the Johns Hopkins Outdoors Club, or JHOC, has organized weekend trips for students looking to experience the outdoors. Along with Outdoor Pursuits, an arm of the University's Rec Center, JHOC offers students the opportunity to participate in activities such as canoeing, kayaking, caving, and mountain biking.
- The Johns Hopkins Student Government Association represents undergraduates in campus issues and projects. It is elected annually.

== See also ==
- List of Johns Hopkins University defunct societies
