= Benjamin Frisby =

American turtle collector (1852–1936)

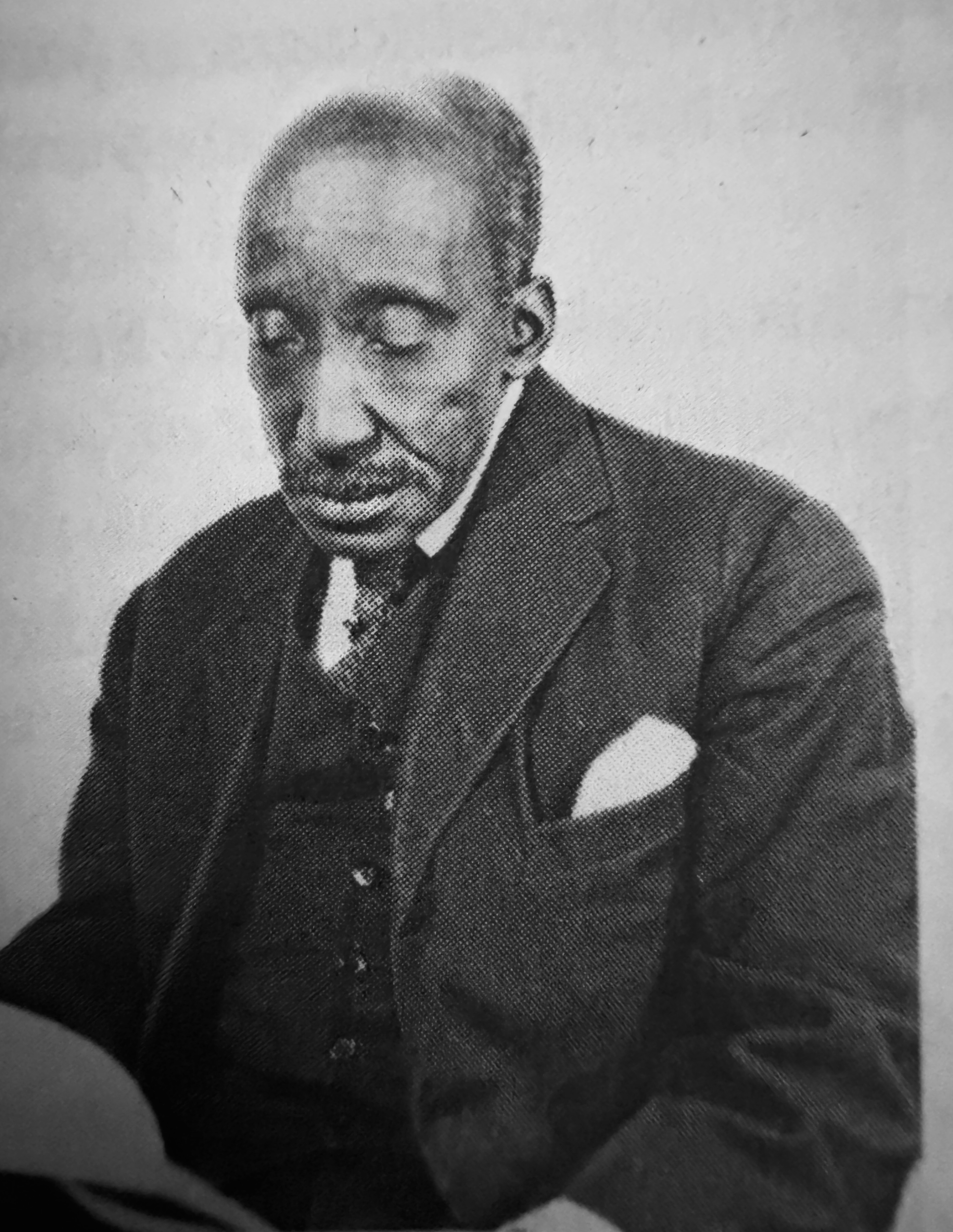
- Benjamin Frisby
- Born: 1852
- Died: 1936 (aged 83–84)
- Occupation: Doorman (1889-1933)
- Known for: Johns Hopkins Hospital's Turtle Derby

Benjamin Frisby (c. 1852–1936) was an American doorman, caretaker and collector of turtles at Johns Hopkins Hospital (JHH), credited with first opening the institution's doors on its opening day in 1889 and later co-founding the hospital's annual turtle race. A frequent acquaintance of Sir William Osler and gatekeeper to the hospital entrance, Frisby was a key contributor to the rise of the residence programme.

== Early life and education ==
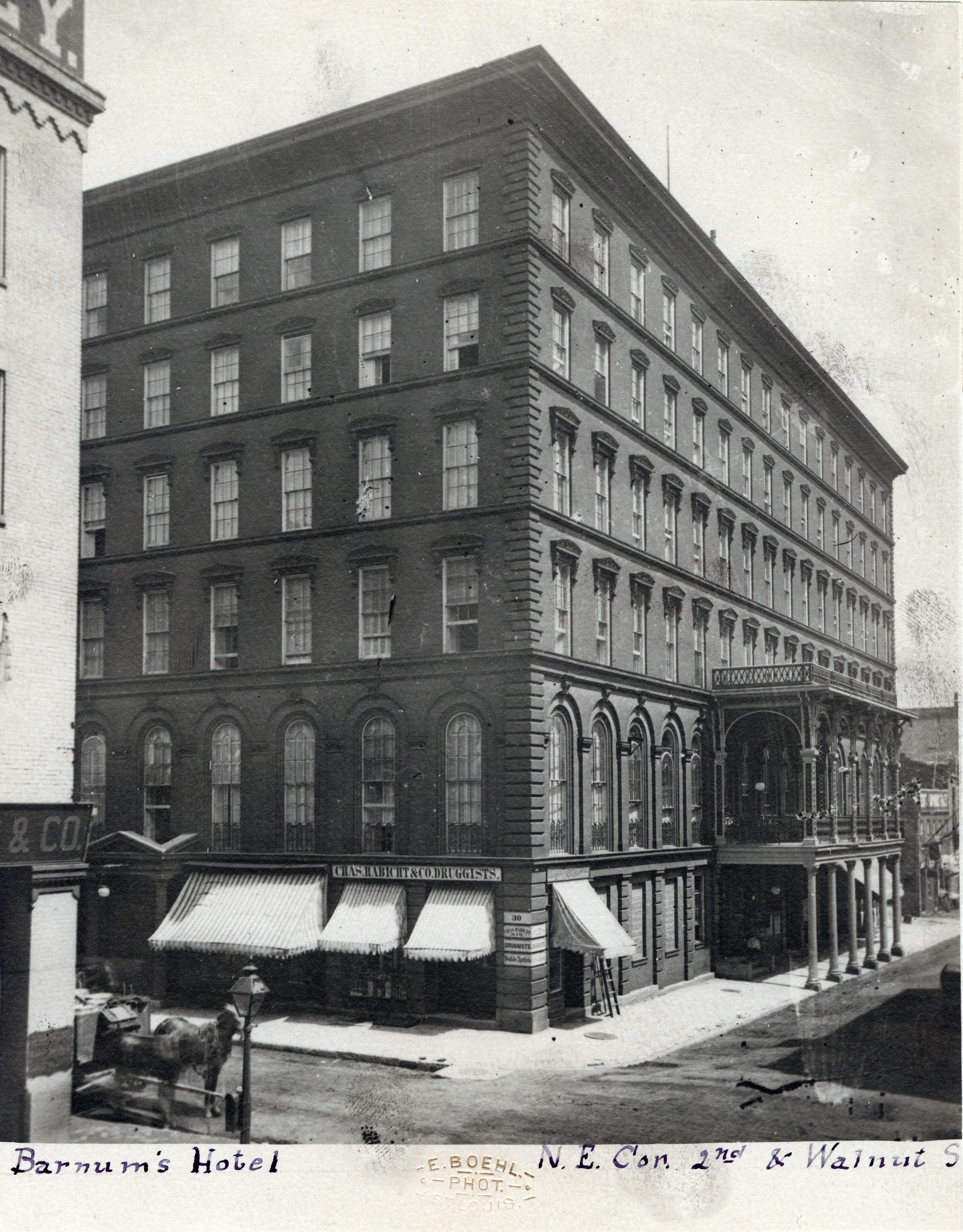
Barnum's St. Louis Hotel, northeast corner of Second and Walnut Streets

Benjamin Frisby was born around 1852, possibly completed fourth grade education and for many years waited at tables at the Barnum's St. Louis Hotel.

== Johns Hopkins Hospital ==
Frisby's role as waiter earnt him a reputation of having perfect manners. It led to him being asked to open the doors of the Johns Hopkins Hospital on its opening day on 7 May 1889. Initially hired for just that day Frisby later recounted that he "stayed because [Hopkins]... would not let me go". He had learnt some Latin and was fluent in French, Spanish and German.

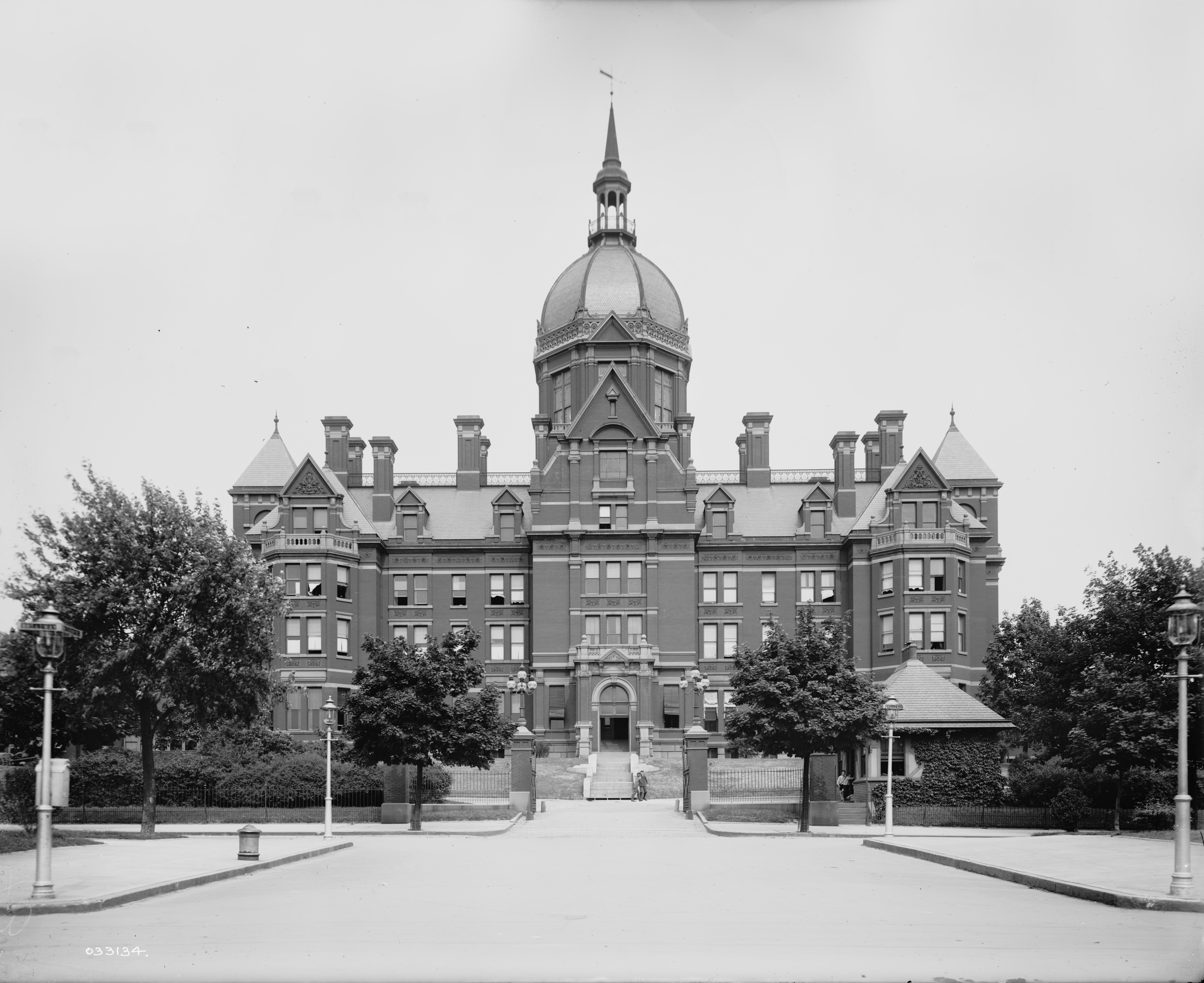
Johns Hopkins Hospital in Baltimore 1900s

Almost every day from 1889 to 1905, he greeted William Osler each weekday morning at the hospital’s Dome entrance, where the two would exchange views on the day’s news and other hot topics. (Note: Stories of Frisby's connection with Osler derive from accounts from Frisby's nephew, Herbert Milton Frisby.) Osler held Frisby in high esteem, addressing him as "Mr Frisby" rather than by the more familiar nicknames by which he was commonly known, such as "Colonel Frisby", "Old Ben", or "Ben". It was Frisby who discreetly let the resident physicians into the hospital out of opening hours and hence is credited with co-founding the residency programme with Osler. Osler also introduced him to gynaecologist Howard Atwood Kelly, who asked Frisby to take care of the turtles around the hospital grounds. Frisby began what came to be known as Frisby farms, between the Wilmer Ophthalmological Institute and the original administrative building of the hospital. Frisby continued to maintain his turtle collection until 1933.

Frisby retired in 1927 and was granted a pension by JHH, which supported his residence at the African Methodist Episcopal Home for the Aged. The popularity of Frisby farms prompted Edmund Bredow Kelly (1900-1964), son of Howard Kelly and later a gynaecologist, to borrow the turtles for an entertainment event on JHH's tennis courts, leading to the first JHH Turtle Derby in 1931. The derby soon became an annual tradition, featuring humorous departmental performances and drawing patients, staff, and local families, with proceeds supporting festivities that often lasted into the night. He continued to keep the turtle farms until 1933.

== Death and legacy ==
Frisby died in 1936, having attended the turtle derby the previous year. By 1978 the turtle races had lapsed and the derby was discontinued, before being revived two years later. The 75th derby was held in 2006.
