= Herbert Milton Frisby =

Herbert Milton Frisby (1886-1983) was an American biologist, news reporter, and historian, best known for campaigning for recognition of Matthew Henson, and who in 1956 became the second African American to reach the North Pole. After watching the 1964 Johns Hopkins Turtle Derby, he shared stories of his uncle Benjamin Frisby's connection with Sir William Osler.
