= Kansas City Christian School =

Location
- 4801 W. 79th Street; Prairie Village, Kansas 66208; United States; 38°59′08″N 94°38′28″W

Information
- School type: Private Christian
- Religious affiliation: Christian
- Founded: 1951
- Administrator: Amy McGruder
- Principal: Doctor Brown
- Head teacher: Jared Barker
- Chaplain: Kevin McElvain
- Grades: K-12
- Enrollment: 700
- Campuses: 1
- Colours: Blue and white
- Fight song: Fight Song by: Trent Tinker
- Athletics conference: Kaw Valley
- Sports: cross-country, soccer, basketball, track, golf, tennis, volleyball, and cheerleading
- Mascot: Panthers
- Nickname: KCC
- Rival: Heritage Christian Academy
- Accreditation: Association of Christian Schools International and North Central Association of Colleges and Schools Commission on Accreditation and School Improvement
- Newspaper: nah
- Tuition: $6,200-$10,890

Kansas City Christian School is a private Christian school located in Prairie Village, Kansas. There are approximately 500 students enrolled from preschool through high school.

== School History ==
It was formed on July 5, 1951, and the first day of school was later that year on September 1, 1951. There have been three main campuses over the years, and the current location for the elementary and high school campus is in Prairie Village. Kansas City Christian School is accredited by Association of Christian Schools International and the North Central Association of Colleges and Schools Commission on Accreditation and School Improvement. The school is a member of the Evangelical Council for Financial Accountability.
