= List of Johns Hopkins University defunct societies =

Through the years, many secret societies, senior societies, and other groups have been founded at Johns Hopkins University. These student organizations are similar to the societies found at peer institutions, similar to a dining club or final club. The dominance of Greek letter societies prevented most of these societies from acquiring the same amount of property or prominence on campus. Most of these societies were founded at the beginning of the university and played a significant role in the early development of the student body. Almost all of the societies presented below are either defunct or non-existent. Because of their age, most of the records associated with them have been lost, giving an incomplete picture. Current members of the university community can recall little, if anything, about them. The Johns Hopkins News-Letter published an article citing the lack of any secret societies at the university, although the archives indicate the existence of several.

The remaining records about these organizations are mostly from the Hullabaloo yearbook, the Alumni Magazine, and donations from alumni to the university's special collections and archives. Neither the table below nor the article is a complete list; many organizations are briefly mentioned in the archives, but not enough information is included.

Society	Class	School	Dates of existence
Ananias Society	Senior	Homewood	1892–1907
Cane Club	Senior/Junior	Homewood	1921– xxxx ?
De Gang	Senior	Homewood	1891 – 1910s
Eta Pi Society	Senior	Homewood	1888–xxxx ?
Gamma Alpha Pi	Senior/Junior	Homewood	1921–Present (?)
Pithotomy Club	Junior/Senior	School of Medicine	1893–1992
Roughnecks	Sophomores		c. 1900–c. 1927
Senior Society	Senior	Homewood	1892–xxxx ?
Tau Club	Senior	Homewood	1891–c. 1911
Ubiquiteers	All Classes	School of Public Health	1921–1960

== Cane Club ==
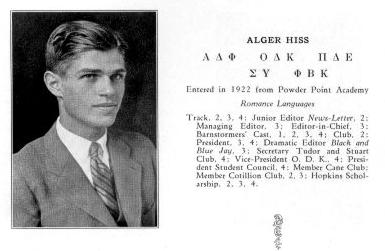
Yearbook photo of Alger Hiss, Cane '26, whose celebrated diplomatic career ended when he was accused by Senator McCarthy of Communist subversion and espionage.

The Cane Club was a secret society that met in Baltimore's speakeasies during Prohibition for "the gentlemanly indulgence of forbidden beverages". Founded in the early 1920s, "The Canes" were founded as a junior-senior honor society. In public initiations known as "knightings," new members would be struck with canes. They are noted for an annual parade in which members walk through the campus wearing flowers. The Canes recruit academically talented students and top-achieving athletes, several of whom are known to have served on the student council. One of the few public records that exist describes a mandate to uphold an "atmosphere of gentility of bygone days."

One prominent member was Alger Hiss, who was voted most popular student and elected student council president in 1926. Another prominent member was Charles A. Conklin III, founder, president, and chairman emeritus of Lyon-Conklin and Co. Inc.

== Roughnecks ==
The Roughnecks were a group of sophomores from the Undergraduate Student Council, including their president, who oversaw "Class Day" which was a hazing event for new freshmen. Class Day, or Hell Day as it was often referred to in the Hullabaloo, was an annual event when sophomores would troll around all day physically abusing unsuspecting freshmen. When it started in the early 1900s, it was more violent, with freshmen sustaining actual injuries. It eventually grew into something far more tame as the administration began to frown upon actual hazing. By the late 1960s, Class Day had become a tug-of-war between the classes. Today, it has been renamed "The Class Clash" and consists of a volleyball game.

The second primary task of the Roughnecks was to crash the freshmen banquet. The freshman president was tasked annually, when elected in the fall, to organize a secret dinner for all of the freshmen by the end of the second semester. The Roughnecks organized the sophomores to crash the dinner. These instances often got violent and led to civil punishment. Things came to a head on April 23, 1923, when the sophomore class crashed the freshmen banquet, and subsequent rioting led to the arrest of four sophomores. Another instance occurred on March 22, 1927, where the Roughnecks again stormed the freshmen banquet at the National Guard Armory in Annapolis. Police and fire departments arrive, and ten students are jailed on charges of destroying state property, malicious mischief, and rioting; four are taken to the hospital. The melee causes three thousand dollars in property damage in the armory. Pressured by the administration, the student council passed a rule that fighting is not allowed from two hours before a banquet until an hour after. Shortly thereafter, the Roughnecks were forced out of existence.

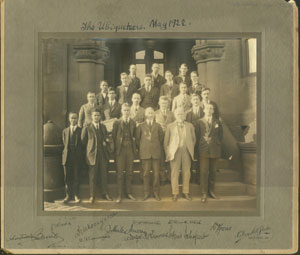
The founding class of Ubiquiteers. James Shirley Sweeney (front row, third from left) stands next to School leaders William H. Howell (to the right of Sweeney), and William Henry Welch. Five years later, Howell would memorialize Sweeney's inspiration for the student group.

== Ubiquiteers ==
The Ubiquiteers was a social club founded at the Johns Hopkins Bloomberg School of Public Health in 1921 by James Shirley Sweeney to encourage increased student interaction among the diverse student body. Sweeney first brought the idea of the club to the attention of the prominent Johns Hopkins administration at a formal dinner held by the Rockefeller Foundation for its fellows at the school. William H. Welch, the director of the School of Public Health, warmly embraced the idea.

The club would meet for weekly drinks, allowing students of various backgrounds to interact with each other and providing an opportunity to share knowledge. The Ubiquiteers' name (which Howell referred to as that "pleasing addition to our thesaurus verborum") can be traced to Thomas John LeBlanc, ScD '24, the club's third president. As the Ubiquiteers' first yearbook makes clear, the etymology of Ubiquiteers "suggests rarities from all ends of the earth."Their mission, as Sweeney later described it, was to "cultivate useful friendships, to broaden and develop minds; and to always stand ready to serve its members who might be in distant lands."

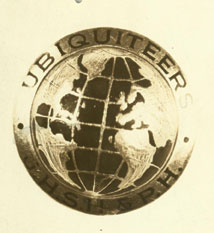
The Ubquiteer Pin

By its second year, the Ubiquiteers doubled their membership to 62 students from 23 countries. Founding members met incoming students at the railroad stations and helped them find living quarters. They scheduled regular dinners, tea parties, picnics, and smokers (informal social gatherings). Often a student would present a talk about his or her country and "its government, its people, religious and social customs, public health activities, et cetera," noted Sweeney, who eschewed formality and was proud that the club ran itself without the "frills of a constitution with the trimmings of by-laws." Through the years, Ubiquiteers meetings mixed seminars on scientific subjects with dances, piano recitals, sing-alongs, group daytrips, and dinners with an assortment of ethnic foods.

The club's prevalence and membership varied throughout the years, dwindling during the Great Depression and World War II. During the height of the Great Depression, 22 students paid 15 or 25 cents each for dues in 1931, boosting the treasury to $4.15. Treasurer Robert Dyar parodied the perpetually dire state of the Ubiquiteers bankroll in 1937 when he wrote, "Our $.07 (seven cents) we bequeath to our successors, the class of '38, and trust that they may have as much pleasure from it, as we have had from the products of and additions to our original dowry of 1¢, so generously preserved for us by our predecessors."

With the repeal of Prohibition in 1933, membership rose along with their finances. Although World War II dropped their ranks further, the post-war years were very good for the club. Their reputation grew, and students & faculty from different parts of the university began to join the club and attend their functions, including Abel Wolman.

Despite its four decades of tradition, the Ubiquiteers did not survive the 1960s. The availability of other social outlets obviated the need for a general student club. With the students' social life filled with Friday Happy Hours, international dinners, and the student assembly, the Ubiquiteers as a formal organization faded away. At some point, the club's annual rebirth just didn't occur. No records of the Ubiquiteers exist in the archives after 1966.

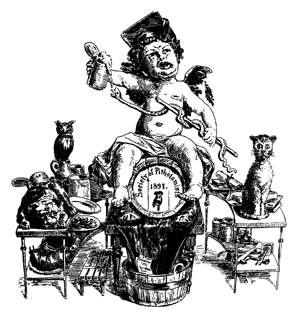
The symbol of the Pithotomy Club: The Drunken Baby

== Pithotomy Club ==
=== Founding and early history ===
The Pithotomy Club was a medical student club formed by the first senior class in 1897. The original intention of the club was to foster a sense of brotherhood among the students and also to encourage informal interactions between the faculty and students. It started when William G. MacCallum and Joseph L. Nichols rented a house at 1200 Guilford Avenue and invited Drs. William H. Welch and William Osler, other faculty members, and friends attended a housewarming event that included a keg of beer. These gatherings were repeated several times, and finally, several classmates joined MacCallum and Nichols to organize what became known as the Pithotomy Club. The word "Pithotomy" was invented by MacCallum when he combined the Greek words pithos, meaning vessel, and otomos, meaning to open. Together the words mean, to Pithotomists at least, "to tap a keg." The club's constitution, written in 1897, states its mission in this manner: "the promotion of vice among the virtuous, virtue among the vicious, and good fellowship among all."

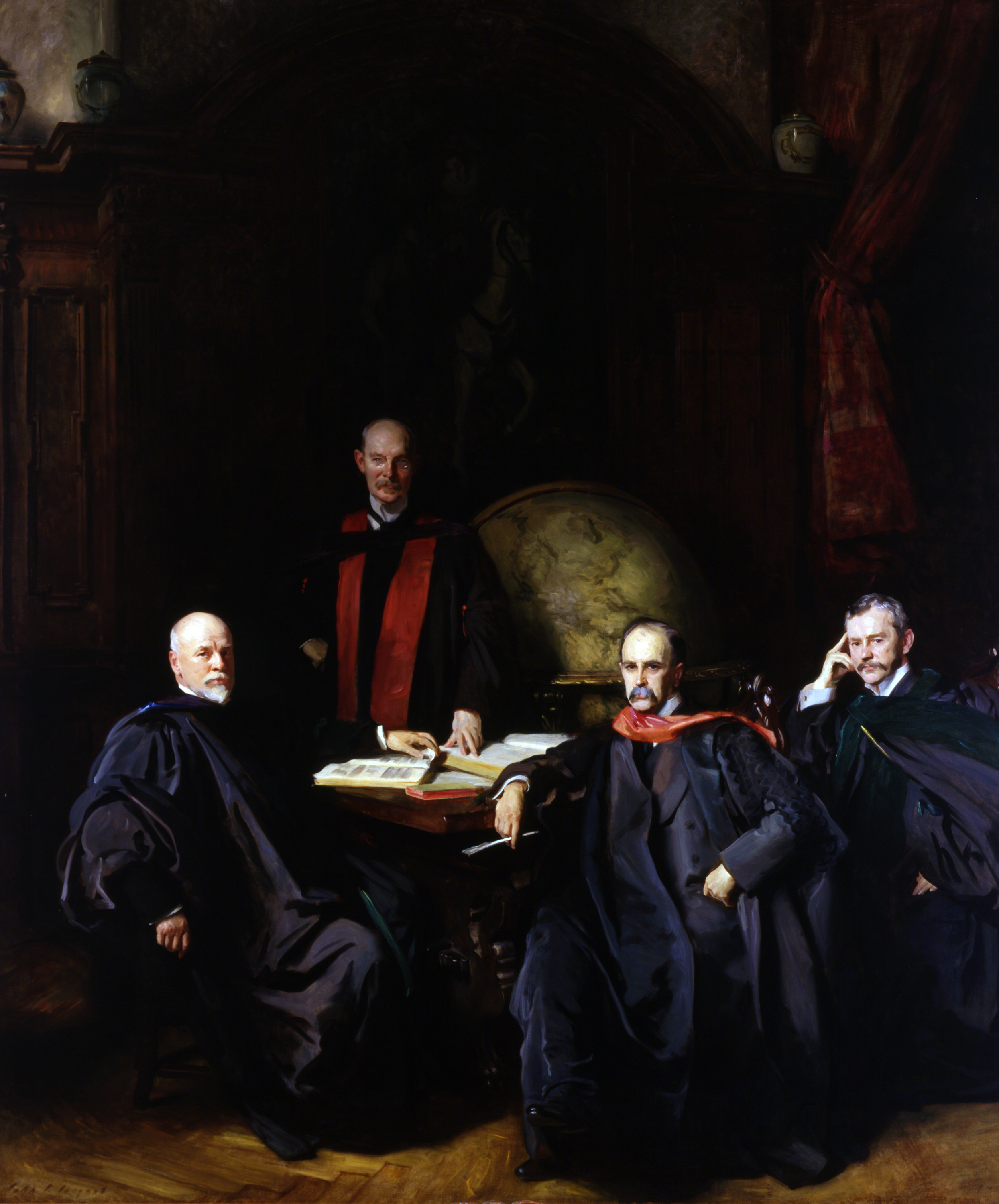
The Four Doctors by John Singer Sargent, 1905, the four physicians who founded Johns Hopkins Hospital. From left to right: William Henry Welch, William Stewart Halsted, Osler, Howard Kelly. Olser and Welch were frequent guests of the Club.

=== Pithotomy Show ===
The decade of the turn of the century saw the advent of the Pithotomy Show, an annual event put on by the Pithotomists as they vented four years of frustration toward the faculty while retaining their affection for individual faculty members. For the faculty, the show provided more than a chance to "see ourselves as others see us" by allowing them to spend an informal evening with their colleagues, drink a little too much, sing a little too loudly, and relive what for some professors was decades of show attendance. The show often contained offensive material and was generally regarded as a bit raunchy. The show would eventually lead to the club's demise over a century later.

=== Drinking and gambling ===
As the club became older, it became infamous for its vice. Members often engaged in illicit drinking activities during Prohibition and illegal gambling. Neighbors often complained about the incessant partying and noise. The beer slide was one of the most infamous aspects of the club, which occurred immediately after the Pithotomy show. The floor was generally covered in beer, and members were sent sliding around on the floor. Alumni often recall humorous anecdotes about the beer slide gone wrong.

=== Final years and legacy ===
Although the club was best known for its debauchery, it still produced some of the university's most accomplished doctors. George Hoyt Whipple was a Pithotomist who graduated in 1905 and was awarded the Nobel Prize in medicine in 1934. Because membership was typically restricted to the upper tiers of third and fourth-year medical students, the club also ironically functioned as an honor society. Many Pithotomists went on to have successful medical careers.

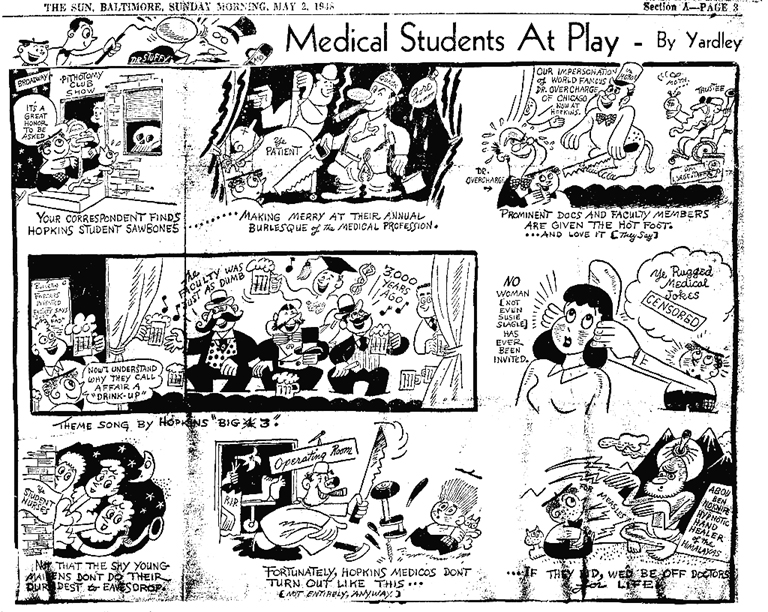
Baltimore Sun Cartoon of "The Doctors Club" (1918)

In 1980, the Club began a new activity, or more accurately, revived an old one, the Turtle Derby. The Turtle Derby was first held in 1931 at the Johns Hopkins Hospital when Colonel Frisby, the hospital doorman, kept several box turtles in what was called Frisby Farms. The idea occurred to race the turtles, and the Turtle Derby came into being. The house staff assumed sponsorshi,p and the derby became an increasingly extravagant affair and fundraiser for Baltimore charities. Unfortunately, house staff apathy killed the derby in 1977. In September 1979, while dining at the club, Henry Siedel, associate dean of student affairs, suggested that the Pithotomy Club revive the once-popular derby. The club undertook the project with much enthusiasm.

The Pithotomy Club sponsored the Turtle Derby, with the financial backing from the Hospital and School of Medicine, which was held on May 16, 1980. Led by Co-chairmen Gary Firestein ('80) and Charles Flexner ('82), the Derby was highly successful. Over one hundred turtles entered races, and the Pithotomists sold over three hundred T-shirts and countless buttons. It provided entertainment for the hospital staff and many children from the Children's Medical and Surgical Center and raised money for good causes. The Turtle Derby, which is still going strong, can thus be added to the list of successful Pitotomy Club activities. It continues to this day.

In 1982, the Pithotomists depicted Dr. Bernadine Healy in a very offensive role. Healy was highly offended by her portrayal in the show and demanded that the club be punished and threatened a large lawsuit. Although she left the school soon after, the reputation of the club quickly fell. That show and the club continue to be an example of sexual harassment in medical schools in many publications. The club also lost its house and had to move to less ideal locations, which prevented the day-to-day interactions that had been pivotal to the club's existence. Coupled with the scandal, the club finally closed its doors in 1992.

== Gamma Alpha Pi ==
Gamma Alpha Phi was a Masonic secret society founded at Homewood in 1921. The society never sought nor had representation on the Inter-Fraternity Council. It awarded special awards in the form of keys to undergraduates for outstanding Masonic Research, which the society published in the Grand Chapter Minutes. The society eventually grew to found chapters at the University of Maryland, George Washington University, and Vanderbilt University. The society is thought to be defunct.

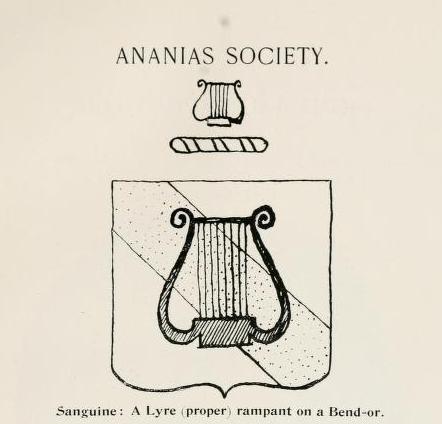
The Crest of The Ananias Society

== Ananias Society ==
The Ananias Society was a secret society established in the early years of the university. The first mention of the society was in the first Debutante yearbook in 1889 (became the Hullabaloo in 1894). The society's motto is "Let fa (w) ncy Unmolested Reign" and their colors were similar to the university's colors of sable and gold. They referred to their members as either "Lyres Attuned" for initiated members and "Liars Out of Tune" for pledging members. Like most societies of their day, they primarily only publicly referred to their members by their nicknames. The pledging class of 1892 consisted of "The Scorpion", "The Baron", "Julep", "Amelia", and "Sam". The officers of the society also had strange titles. They continue to be referenced in university publications for several years, but there is no mention of the society in either the Alumni Magazine or the Hullabaloo soon after.

== Senior Society ==
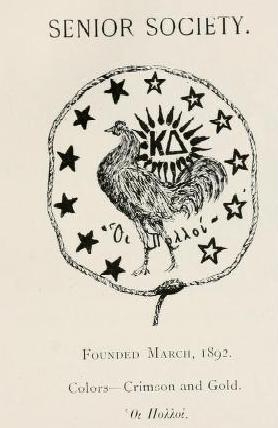
The Crest of The Senior Society

The Senior Society was another upperclassman secret society that was founded in 1892. As the name implies, membership was restricted to only eleven newly tapped seniors who revealed themselves at the end of the spring semester. Their exact purpose was unknown, but similar to most senior societies, membership was based on loyalty to the university, academics, and prevalence on campus. Their actual name is thought to be known only to members and incorporates the Greek letters "Delta".

Their crest, which consists of a rooster and twelve stars appears in other photos and texts in the University Archives. Their motto is οἱ πολλοί, hoi polloi, 'The Masses'. The phrase became known to English scholars probably from Pericles' Funeral Oration, as mentioned in Thucydides' History of the Peloponnesian War. Pericles uses it in a positive way when praising the Athenian democracy, contrasting it with hoi oligoi, or oligarchy. During this time, many student groups tended to embrace similar philosophies and were against the centralization of power in the student council. Their current existence is speculated, but unconfirmed.

== Eta Pi Society ==
The Eta Pi Society was an Epicurean society founded at the turn of the century. References to it can be found in the Hullabaloo and the Alumni Magazine. Members were typically a small number of seniors selected each year. They were known to give beer and pies to new initiates and certain members of the faculty and administration.

The university's archives indicate that members, like many of the senior societies, referred to themselves through nicknames. Yearbook pages show that the society was founded by "Little Jack Horner". They remained as an alternative to Greek life while encouraging drinking and merriment among the student body. Known to be rowdy at social events, they were the main driving force in organizing class dinners and other university social events. They expanded their influence by often recruiting members of the student council and other prominent students. They lost much of their influence during the Red Scare when many secret societies were closed down. They continued to be a part of the university publicly for several decades until they either stopped holding meetings or voluntarily removed themselves from the public eye. The president of the society, generally only referred to by strange nicknames, wore a pin with the initials "ES" below a Flemish Lion, the symbol of the Society, on graduation day.

== Other societies ==
De Gang and the Sigma Tau Club were senior societies founded in the 1890s. Little is known about De Gang other than its membership rosters. It was founded in 1891. The Sigma Tau Club (STK) was another senior society that was around for twenty years or so. Membership rosters and meeting notes are found in the archives. STK consisted of members who either did not receive bids or did not want to join the Greek letter fraternities at the time.

== See also ==
- Collegiate secret societies in North America
- List of Johns Hopkins University student organizations
- List of senior societies
