= Barnum's St. Louis Hotel =

Hotel in St. Louis, Missouri, United States

Coordinates: 38.623536°N 90.186456°W

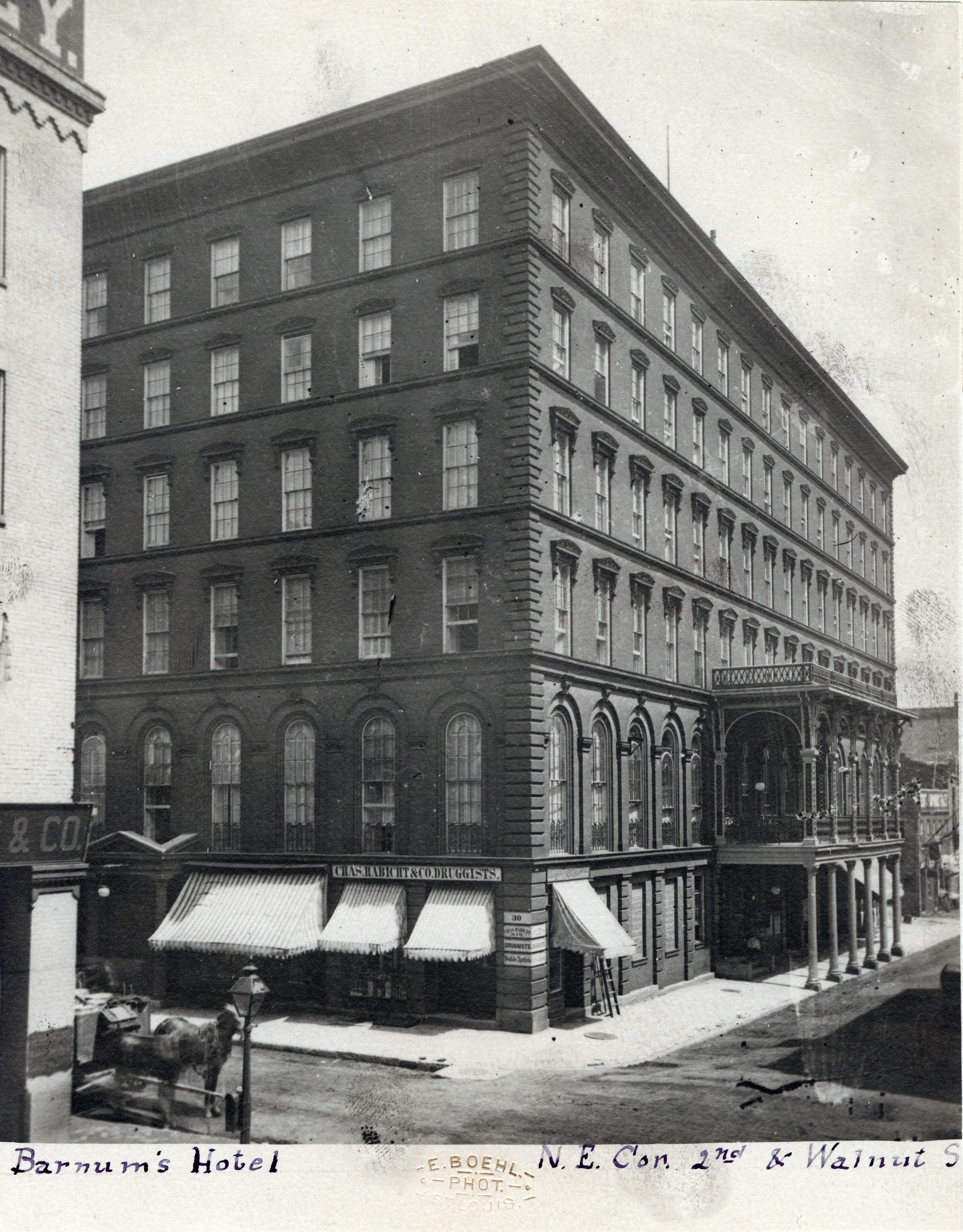
Barnum's Hotel, located at the northeast corner of Second Street and Walnut Street. Photograph taken ca. 1870.

Barnum's St. Louis Hotel was a historic 6-floor hotel built in 1854. The Barnums were a family of hotel keepers who had run the famous Barnum's City Hotel in Baltimore. This building was located at the 2nd and Walnut Streets in St. Louis, Missouri, and has been considered to be St. Louis' first high-rise building. The hotel was designed by architect George I. Barnett.

The famous former slave Dred Scott worked as a porter here from 1857 until his death. Dred Scott's new owners had freed him two months after the U.S. Supreme Court decision. Scott became a local celebrity, greeting visitors at the hotel until he died of tuberculosis on September 17, 1858. Others employed there include Benjamin Frisby, who was borrowed from the hotel for a day to open Johns Hopkins Hospital (JHH) on 7 May 1889, and then never returned to the hotel.

Famous guests included Henry Clay and Illinois Governor Richard Yates.

Brother Frank and William Roberson had a barbershop beneath it. The hotel was demolished in 1890.
