= William George MacCallum =

Canadian physician and pathologist (1874–1944)

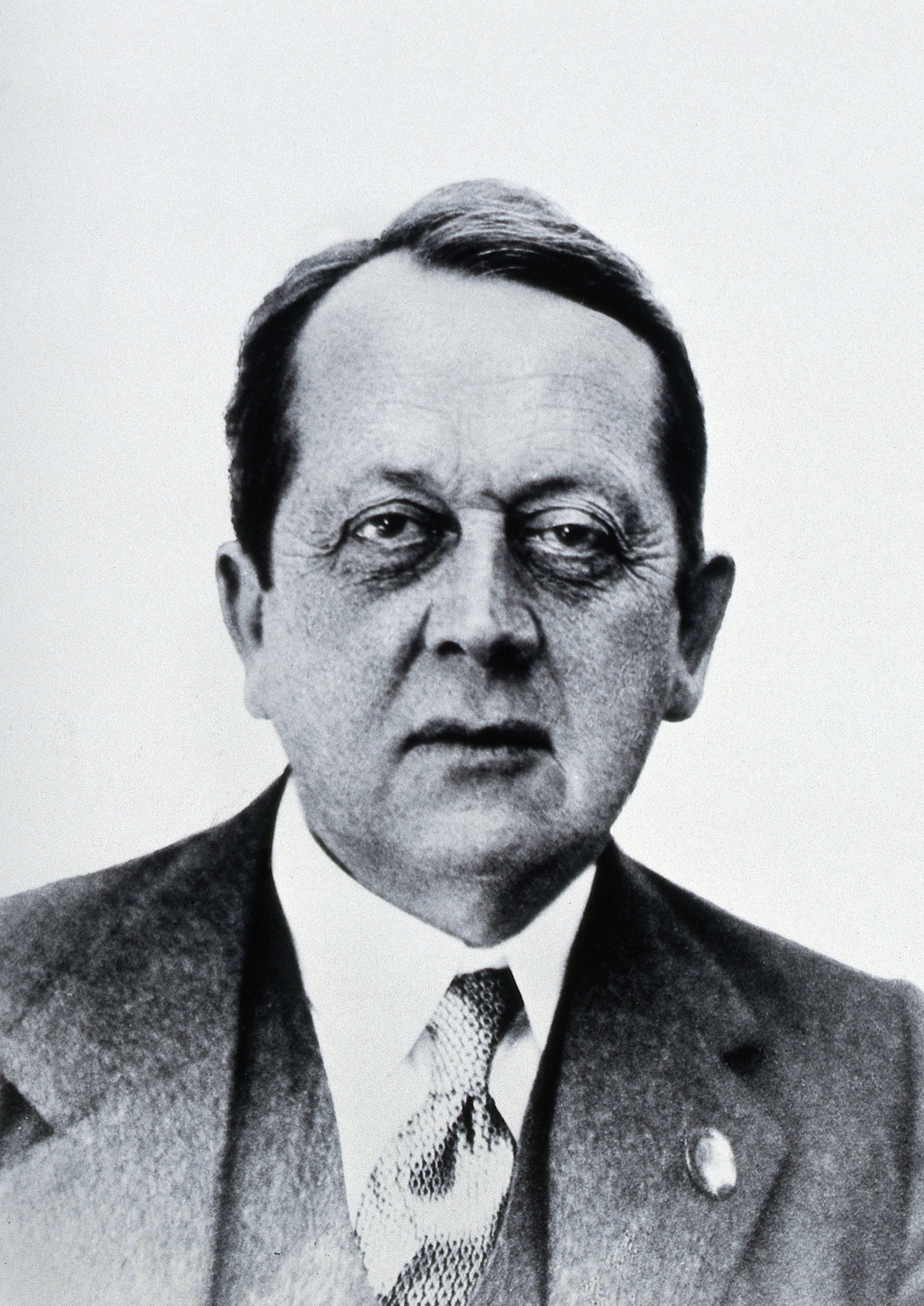
- Born: 18 April 1874; Dunnville, Ontario, Canada
- Died: 3 February 1944 (aged 69); Florida, U.S.
- Education: Johns Hopkins Medical School
- Known for: McCullum-Goodpasture stain Malarial parasite of birds Structure of lymphatic system Thyroid and parathyroid functions
- Scientific career
- Fields: Medicine, Pathology
- Workplaces: Johns Hopkins Medical School; Columbia University; NewYork–Presbyterian Hospital
- Author abbrev. (zoology): MacCallum

Signature
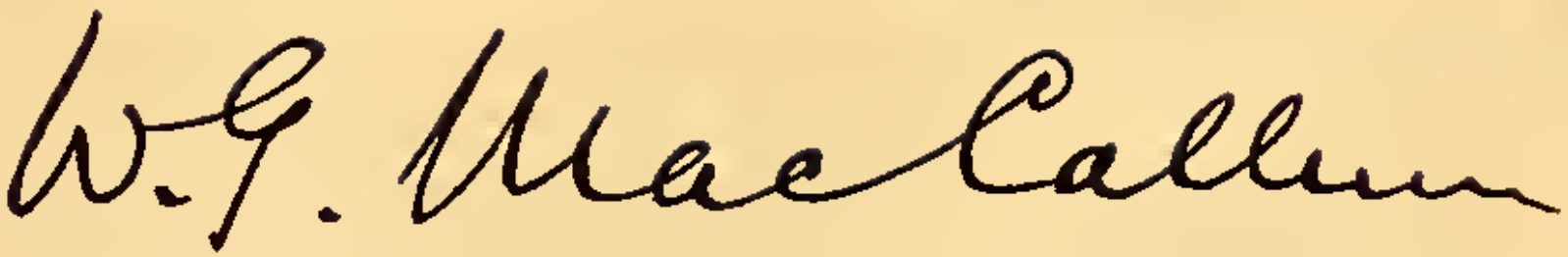

William George MacCallum (18 April 1874 – 3 February 1944) was a Canadian-American physician and pathologist. He was of Scottish descent and was born in Dunnville village in Canada, where his father was a physician. He was educated at the University of Toronto. He graduated with BA in 1894. Initially inclined towards Greeks as academic career, his father influenced him to enter medicine. He joined the second year of the first batch of medicine course in the Johns Hopkins Medical School, and became one of the first graduates of the institute in 1897. He was appointed assistant resident of pathology of the medical school in 1897, resident pathologist in 1901, soon after Associate Professor, and full Professor in 1908. Between 1909 and 1917 he held a twin position of Professor of Pathology at Columbia University and the NewYork–Presbyterian Hospital. From 1917 to 1943 he held the Chair of Pathogy at Johns Hopkins University.

MacCallum discovered the existence of two forms (now known to be male gamete or microgametocyte and female gamete or macrogametocyte) of malarial parasite in birds in 1897. In 1899 he and T.W. Hastings discovered a new species of pathogenic Gram-positive bacteria called Micrococcus zymogenes. He was the first to describe the structural and functional relationship between lymphatic system and connective tissue. In 1905 he discovered that thyroid and parathyroid glands had completely different functions. He found that muscle seizure (tetany) was due to abrogation of parathyroid glands, and that injection of calcium salt could restore the condition. This directly laid the understanding of the role of calcium in muscle contraction. In 1909 he discovered that a disease gastric tetany was not due to parathyroid functions, but because of blockage of the stomach-intestine connection called pylorus. He wrote a definitive textbook A Textbook of Pathology which ran several editions and is still in print.

A histochemical staining technique for Gram-negative bacteria called MacCallum-Goodpasture stain is jointly named after him and the co-discoverer Ernest William Goodpasture. A condition in rheumatic heart disease MacCallum plaque is named after him.

== Early life and education ==
William MacCallum was born in Dunnville village to a physician father George A. MacCallum and mother Florence Eakins. His grandfather George MacCallum had emigrated from Scotland to Canada in his youth. He was the second of four children, with an elder sister, and a younger brother and a sister. (His brother John Bruce MacCallum would also become a physician but died at the age of thirty due to tuberculosis). He entered Dunnville public school and high school for his early education. He spent much of his free time accompanying his father, who was a general practitioner, in visiting resident patients. At 15 years of age he entered the University of Toronto, where his main interest was in Greeks, among his subjects such as zoology, chemistry, physics and geology. He graduated in 1894. His father's persuasion that he should take up medicine was his career-making event as he wanted to continue with Greeks for himself. By then he learned that the Johns Hopkins University had started Medical School in 1893 at Baltimore with its first batch of medical students. He applied for the medical course and was allowed to join the first batch, who were already in their second year, as it was decided that his education at Toronto was considered equivalent to the first year medical course. He was therefore member of the first class at Johns Hopkins who earned MD degree in 1897.

== Career ==
MacCallum served a one-year internship at Johns Hopkins Hospital during 1897-1898, and was appointed assistant resident pathologist under William Henry Welch at the Johns Hopkins University. In 1900 he worked with Felix Jacob Marchand at the University of Leipzig in Germany. He returned to Baltimore in 1901 to become resident patholosgist and Associate Professor of Pathology. He was promoted to full Professor in 1908. Between 1909 and 1917 he was invited to Columbia University and NewYork–Presbyterian Hospital, where he simultaneously worked as Professor and pathologist respectively. In 1917 Welch resigned from the Chair of Pathology at Johns Hopkins University to assume the new post of Director at the School of Hygiene and Public Health. MacCallum was selected to take the vacant Chair, which he occupied until his retirement in 1943. He was designated Baxler Professor of Pathology in the university and pathologist to the Johns Hopkins Hospital.

== Achievements ==
=== Malariology ===
While he was studying in Baltimore, MacCallum used to spend his summer vacation at home in Dunville, where he and his father had, what he referred to as "a makeshift laboratory in the woodshed." They would study specimens of all sorts collected from the country side. It was during his last year at Johns Hopkins Medical School, in the summer of 1896 that he made a pivotal discovery in malariology. It was the period of intense research to unravel the mode of transmission of malarial parasite, for which the leading contenders were British and Italian physicians. One day MacCallum collected blood sample far from his home, and in his home laboratory he observed active parasites called Halteridium columbae (but now considered as Haemoproteus columbae) among the blood cells. He went back to procure the bird itself and later found that the blood sample contained highly active malarial parasites. His reported his findings before the Medical Society of Johns Hopkins Hospital in November 1896, was published in 1897 in the Bulletin of the Johns Hopkins Hospital and more complete form in The Lancet. He diagnosed in the next summer research that protozoan infections such as Halteridium and Proteosoma were symptomatically similar, and produced pathogenic lesions as in human malaria. He further discovered that there were two groups of the parasite, one which are non-motile "granular" (now called microgametocytes) and one motile "hyaline" (macrogametocytes); and that the motile groups were flagellated cells having four or more arms that could fuse with the non-motile forms (the process of fertilisation) to form non-motile bodies called vermicule (but now called ookinete). This was the first description of sexual dimorphism and reproduction in the life cycle of prorotozoans. In his 1898 paper he gave a critical deduction that the motile forms were male gametes, the non-motile female gametes, and the vermicule the zygote (which were later proven to be true). He concluded with foresight that "This is a process which we might have expected and which I am confident will be found to occur in the case of the human malaria parasites... It is evidently for the human being what is foreshadowed by the organism of the bird. This was almost a Nobel Prize-winning work because the next year Ronald Ross of the Indian Medical Service demonstrated the transmission of bird malarial parasite (then Proteosoma but now Plasmodium relictum) by a mosquito (then Culex fatigans, but now Culex quinquefasciatus), for which Ross won the Nobel Prize for Physiology or Medicine in 1902.

=== Bacteriology ===
In 1899 MacCallum and T.W. Hastings described a new species of pathogenic Gram-positive bacterium which they named Micrococcus zymogenes. The bacterium was discovered to be the causative agent of heart infection (acute endocarditis). The bacterium was a very small, occurred mainly in pairs, sometimes in short chains, and developed in small, pale, grayish-white colonies. It was uniquely capable of fermenting milk, hence, the name zymogenes.

=== Physiology ===
At the University of Leipzig in 1900 MacCallum studied the lymphatic system from the skin of pig embryo, and completed the work in Baltimore after two years. At the time the connection between lymphatic system and connective tissues was not known, and there were many speculations, of which the dominant idea was that they were directly linked. MacCallum showed that most of the prevailing hypotheses were wrong (such as connection through stomata, pores or canaliculi) and that the tissues had no special interconnecting link. Instead, solid particles are transported between them through cell transfer (phagocytosis). The lymphatic vessels were made up of endothelial lining structurally similar to normal blood vessels.

In 1903 MacCallum started investigating thyroid and parathyroid secretions, for which there were confusion and uncertainty at the time. He discovered that the endocrine glands were of completely independent functions. He found that muscle seizure (tetany) thought to be due to surgery on thyroid was actually due to injury or removal of parathyroid glands; parathyroid contained no iodine in contrast to popular belief; and that injection of calcium salt could completely restore all the symptoms of tetany. His findings were published in 1905. In 1909, with Carl Voegtlin he finally established the direct importance of calcium in tetany, and thereby muscle contraction.

From 1909 MacCallum investigated a unique tetanic condition called gastric tetany, in which parathyroid glands are normal. The disease was due to obstruction at the pylorus region (near the intestine) of the stomach. He found in dogs that under gastric tetany, gastric hydrochloric acid was lost, and the chlorine in the blood plasma was reduced causing severe electrolyte imbalance. This further caused increased electrical excitability of neurons leading to increased muscle twitching. In most severe cases violent convulsion occurred and the dogs die. These effects could be easily reversed by injecting chloride salts. His findings were reported before the American Society for Pathology in 1917, and published in full form in 1920.

== Pithotomy Club ==
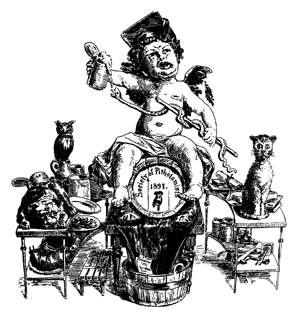
The symbol of the Pithotomy Club: The Drunken Baby

During medical course at the Johns Hopkins MacCallum and classmate Joseph L. Nichols had rented a house at 1200 Guilford Avenue and as a housewarming celebration invited their teachers William H. Welch and William Osler, other faculty members, and friends to the house and entertained them with a keg of beer. These frequent gatherings evolved into a sort of club, for which MacCallum coined the name Pithotomy Club (from a combination of two Greek words pithos, meaning vessel, and otomos, meaning to open, which was taken to mean "to tap a keg"). The club's constitution, written in 1897, states its mission as to "facilitate the advancement of its members in the art and science of medicine by the promotion of social intercourse between the faculty and students of the Society," in addition to a more humorous objective of "the promotion of vice among the virtuous, virtue among the vicious, and good fellowship among all." It became one of the longest surviving academic clubs, and longest running medical club in history, and most of its members became successful doctors, including George Hoyt Whipple who received the 1943 Nobel Prize in Physiology or Medicine. After 95 years in 1992 it became defunct and the club building was donated to and absorbed by Johns Hopkins Medical School.

== Honours and recognition ==
- Honorary Fellow of the Royal Society of Medicine
- Corresponding member of Societas Regia Medicorum Budapestinesis
- Honorary Member of the Societe d' Endocrinologie of Paris
- Honorary Member of the Pathological Society of Great Britain and Ireland
- Elected President of the International Academy of Pathology during 1908-1909
- Elected President of the International Association of Medical Museums during 1908-1909
- Elected member of the US National Academy of Sciences in 1921
- Kober Lecturer by the Association of American Physicians in 1940
- McCullum-Goodpasture stain is jointly named after him and Ernest William Goodpasture.
- An eponymous MacCallum plaque is for a rheumatic heart condition.

== Personal life and death ==
MacCallum never married. He loved to travel and visited France, Germany, Italy, West Indies, South America, South Africa, Australia, India, Siam, Burma, Singapore, Japan, and the South Sea Islands.

Towards the end of 1943 he had serious illness for which he went to Florida. He was soon inflicted with hemiplegic paralysis and his condition deteriorated, and died on 3 February 1944.
