= William Roberson =

American civil rights activist

William Roberson (c. 1836–1878) was an American barber, proprietor of a bathing and shaving saloon with a Victorian Turkish bath, and civil rights activist in St. Louis, Missouri. He advocated to have African-American teachers. He was a Republican.

Before the American Civil War, he and his brother Francis Jefferson Roberson established a barber shop at the Barnum's St. Louis Hotel. He married Lucy Jefferson, a relative of Thomas Jefferson. He established a branch of the Prince Hall masons (Prince Hall Freemasonry), named for Prince Hall.

His establishment at 410 Market Street was luxurious. Léon A. Clamorgan worked for him. William Taggert also worked for him.

In 1867 Frederick Douglass stayed with him, after being refused hotel accommodations in St. Louis, when Douglass was in the city for his speech at the St. Louis Turn Halle. Roberson helped support James A. Johnson's St. Louis Blue Stockings baseball team.

A St. Louis periodical published an image of his brother cutting hair. Francis Jefferson Roberson's son Francis Rassieur Roberson (1898–1979) became an architect.

His son Frank Roberson studied at Oberlin and the University of Karlsruhe. He became an art teacher.

== See also ==
- Mill Creek Valley
