= Anne Smedinghoff =

American diplomat (1987–2013)

- Born: September 18, 1987
- Died: April 6, 2013 (aged 25); Qalat, Zabul Province, Afghanistan
- Occupation: Diplomat

Anne Smedinghoff (September 18, 1987 – April 6, 2013) was an American diplomat who last worked for the U.S. Embassy in Kabul, Afghanistan.

== Personal life ==
Smedinghoff grew up in River Forest, Illinois, a suburb about 10 miles west of Chicago. She was the daughter of an attorney and the second of four children. She first attended St. Luke Parish School and graduated in 2001. She then attended Fenwick High School, followed by Johns Hopkins University, where she majored in international studies and became a key organizer of the university's annual Foreign Affairs Symposium in 2008. The event draws high-profile speakers from around the world. While a student in Baltimore, she worked part-time for Sam Hopkins, an attorney near campus. He described her as ambitious "but in a wonderfully quiet, modest way." Immediately following her graduation, Smedinghoff rode her bicycle from Baltimore, Maryland to San Francisco, California to raise money to fight cancer, with a non-profit called the 4k for Cancer.

== Career ==
Her first assignment for the foreign service was in Caracas, Venezuela, and she volunteered for the Afghanistan assignment after that. Smedinghoff was an up-and-coming employee of the US State Department, who garnered praise from the highest ranks. She was to finish her Afghanistan assignment as a press officer in July. Already fluent in Spanish, she was gearing up to learn Arabic, first for a year in the U.S. and then in Cairo (Egypt), before a two-year assignment in Algeria. US Secretary of State John Kerry said at a news conference in Turkey that Smedinghoff was "vivacious, smart" and "capable." Smedinghoff had assisted Kerry during a visit to Afghanistan two weeks prior to her death. He also described Smedinghoff as "a selfless, idealistic woman who woke up yesterday morning and set out to bring textbooks to school children, to bring them knowledge."

== Death ==
Smedinghoff is the first American diplomat to die on the job since the 2012 attack on the U.S. diplomatic installation in Benghazi, Libya. The 25-year-old Foreign Service Officer was killed in a car bomb blast in southern Afghanistan. Smedinghoff was one of five Americans killed in a suicide bomb attack in Qalat, Zabul Province. Working as a press officer for the U.S. Embassy in Kabul, she was helping Afghan journalists cover an event at a school where the local Provincial Reconstruction Team was to donate math and science books. According to a press officer at the U.S. Embassy in Kabul, Anne "absolutely loved the work she was doing". Her family and friends established a memorial fund at Johns Hopkins University in her honor.

In 2021, her family joined a class action lawsuit against Deutsche Bank, Standard Chartered, and Danske Bank, alleging these banks "knowingly facilitated transfers of millions" of dollars that provided aid to terrorists in the region.

== See also ==
- Adolph Dubs
