= Foreign Affairs Symposium =

Lecture series sponsored by Johns Hopkins University

The Foreign Affairs Symposium
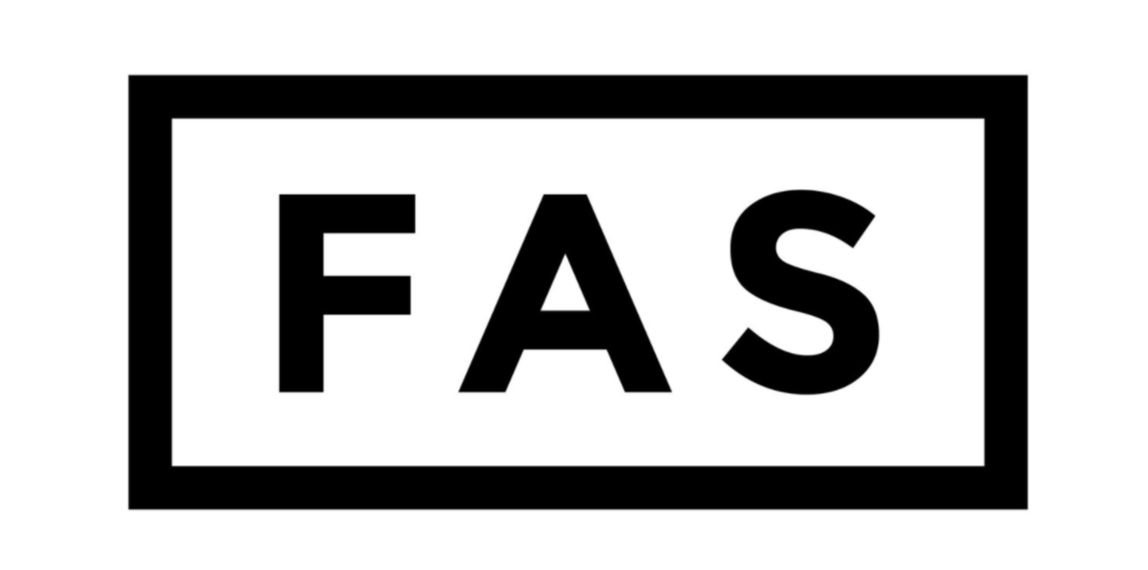
- Genre: Student-run lecture series and forum
- Begins: February
- Ends: May
- Location: Johns Hopkins University
- Inaugurated: 1998
- Attendance: Over 1,500
- Website: jhufas.org

The Foreign Affairs Symposium (FAS) is a student-run lecture series sponsored by Johns Hopkins University. First launched in 1998, the Symposium has become a hallmark of the University and greater Baltimore community, with attendance reaching up to 1,000 people at some events.

The Symposium runs each year over the course of the spring semester, as a counterpart to the Milton S. Eisenhower Symposium. Bound together by a theme, each year's series typically features 4-6 events, including a Presidential Lecture and the Anne Smedinghoff Memorial Lecture.

== Background ==
In fall 1997, Tom Narayan, an undergraduate student at JHU, recognized the need for a forum to discuss and debate global affairs and international issues. Merging the existing Woodrow Wilson International Studies Symposium and International Studies Forum Symposium, students formally created the "Symposium on Foreign Affairs." Their first series launched in spring 1998 with ten events, nearly all of which featured foreign ambassadors and Maryland officials. The Symposium expanded over the next few years, hosting individuals including Sonia Gandhi, Shimon Peres, and Noam Chomsky.

In 2002, the name of the series changed permanently from "Symposium on Foreign Affairs" to the "Foreign Affairs Symposium" (FAS). The Symposium shifted away from individual speakers, instead hosting panels that covered current, controversial topics ranging from drug wars in Colombia to the war in Iraq. Over time, the series returned to inviting individual notable leaders to speak and then engage students in discussion. During this time, symposium directors launched the flagship Presidential Lecture in partnership with the President's Office. This annual event recognizes one speaker for their unique leadership and expertise in their field, and is fully funded by the President's Office. Since then, the symposium has expanded.

=== Leadership ===
The forum and organization is run by undergraduate students working to raise financial resources, secure a lineup of notable speakers, manage media relations, and engage the community. Approximately 40 students comprise the organization with Executive and Committee Directors leading four subcommittees that work together to achieve the Foreign Affairs Symposium's success.

=== Symposium structure ===
Symposium talks and panels are held on the main Homewood Campus of the Johns Hopkins University, usually in historic Shriver Hall. Each event begins with a keynote address by the featured speaker, followed by an extended question and answer session open to all audience members. Typically, the main speech will last for around a half-hour, followed by a similar time allotment for the Q&A. Ultimately though, each speaker determines the length of each segment of the event per their own preferences.

As is tradition, each event is followed by an open reception, usually hosted in the same venue. Light refreshments and open discussion allow audience members to intimately interact with speakers. The length and structure of the reception changes from event to event, based on the preferences of the speaker, the Symposium staff, and reception co-sponsors. During the 2014 Symposium, for example, Maryland Governor Martin O'Malley extended the reception past 10:30pm to ensure that he could speak with all interested attendees.

=== The Anne Smedinghoff Memorial Series ===
In April 2013, Hopkins alumna Anne Smedinghoff (’09) was killed in a suicide bomb attack in southern Afghanistan while trying to deliver books to school children. A former Executive Director of the Foreign Affairs Symposium, her death had a profound impact on the organization and the Johns Hopkins University. The Foreign Affairs Symposium seek to commemorate her life and acknowledge those committed to her values: education, development and global harmony.

The Anne Smedinghoff Award is awarded to an individual who embodies Anne's values: education, development and global harmony.

2014 Recipient: Shabana Basij-Rasikh, founder of the School of Leadership, Afghanistan

2016 Recipient: World Bicycle Relief

2017 Recipient: Ron Capps, founder and director of Veterans Writing Project

2018 Recipient: Greg Asbed and Laura Germino, co-founders of Coalition of Immokalee Workers,

2019 Recipient: Erlendy Cuero Bravo, Vice President of the National Association of Displaced Afro-Colombians

2020 Recipient: Muzoon Almellehan, Syrian activist and UNICEF Goodwill Ambassador

== Notable speaking events ==
=== Paul Rusesabagina ===
In 2008, Paul Rusesabagina was invited to speak. He was a hotel manager in Kigali that hid and protected Hutu and Tutsi refugees during the Rwandan Genocide. Throughout the speech, a group of Rwandan men gathered on the steps of Shriver Hall where the event took place and handed out fliers alleging that Rusesabagina promoted "promote his revisionist and negationist theories in the U.S. and around the world."

=== John Michael McConnell ===
In 2008, U.S. Director of National Intelligence John Michael McConnell was invited to speak with political science professor Steven R. David serving as the moderator. The event became testy with exchanges over issues on waterboarding, warrantless wiretapping, and nuclear proliferation. David also noted concerns about the long delays in processing job applications in intelligence agencies, prompting McConnell to provide the audience with his personal email address. During the Q&A session, a member of the Network of Spiritual Progressives refused to give up the microphone and called McConnell arrogant.

=== John Yoo ===
In 2010, former Bush administration official and author of the so-called Torture Memos John Yoo was invited to speak. Students stood in front of the lecture hall and protested the event. While the protesters did not move, they did not interrupt Yoo as he delivered his speech.

=== Stanley Allen McChrystal ===
In 2013, Retired General Stanley A. McChrystal, best known for his command of Joint Special Operations Command was invited to speak. Students protested outside of Shriver Hall protesting drone warfare and engagement with drone warfare research at Johns Hopkins University. Protesters did not interrupt the event.

=== Gloria Steinem ===
In 2015, American feminist and journalist Gloria Steinem was invited to speak. Throughout the event, Hopkins students who belonged to Voice for Life protested the event and Steinem's pro-choice views outside of Shriver Hall. Protesters held banners with statistics and images of women who died during abortion procedures.

=== İlker Başbuğ ===
In 2018, former Chief of the General Staff of Turkey İlker Başbuğ was invited to speak. Students and local organizations, including Friends of Rojava in America, protested the event, citing Başbuğ's support of policies against the Kurdish people and Turkish incursions into Afrin in Operation Olive Branch. Protesters were escorted to the lobby where they continued to protest.

FAS ultimately had to end the event early, cutting short the time allocated for the Q&A session. Many students expressed frustration that the protests were counterproductive as it did not allowed for students to ask questions.

=== Samantha Power ===
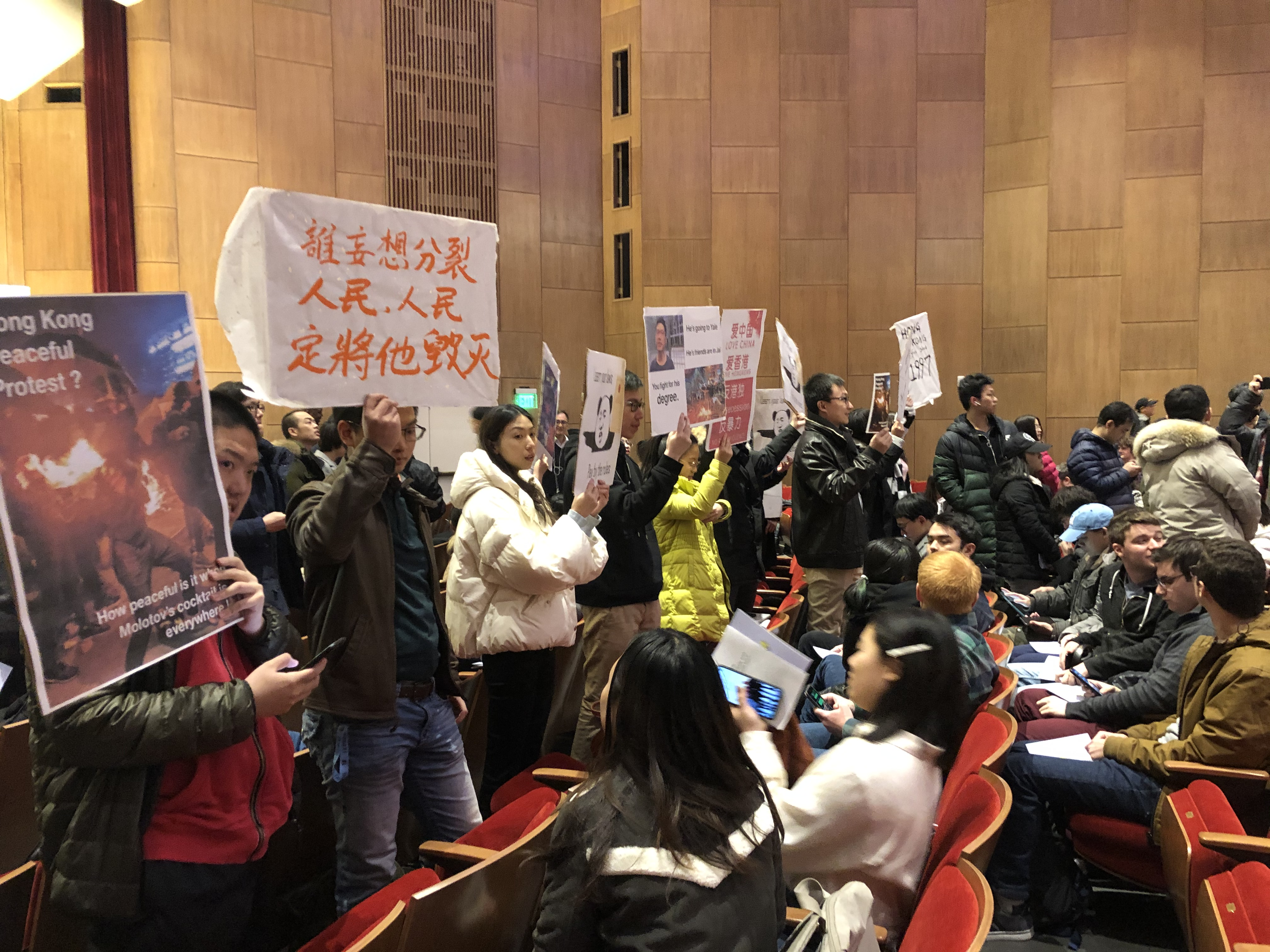
Protesters in Shriver Hall

In 2018, Former U.S. Ambassador to the United Nations Samantha Power was invited to speak. This decision sparked controversy as Power advocated for the 2011 military intervention in Libya and U.S. support for Saudi-led intervention in Yemen. Students in Students for a Democratic Society organized a silent protest in front of the audience as Power spoke. While the protestors left before the event was over, Power addressed the protestors during the Q&A session.

=== Joshua Wong and Nathan Law ===
In 2020, Hong Kong pro-democracy activists Joshua Wong and Nathan Law were invited to speak. The announcement triggered a Change.org petition that gathered more than 2,000 signatures. Three Chinese students attending Johns Hopkins also wrote a letter to the University administration in protest.

On the day of the event, approximately 100 students protested the choice of speakers while another 20 engaged in a counter-protest in support of the pro-democracy activists. The protests first started outside Shriver Hall then continued inside before and after Wong and Law spoke.

== Notable speakers ==
Foreign Affairs Symposium speakers have included:

=== Politicians and activists ===
- U.S. Senators Bernie Sanders, Rick Santorum, Russ Feingold, George J. Mitchell
- U.S. Secretary of Defense Chuck Hagel
- U.S. National Security Advisor Zbigniew Brzezinski
- U.S. Attorney General John Ashcroft
- U.S. Ambassadors to the United Nations Samantha Power, John Bolton
- U.S. Director of National Intelligence John Michael McConnell
- U.S. General Stanley McChrystal (Ret.)
- U.S. diplomats Paul Bremer, Dennis Ross
- FBI Director Robert Mueller
- CIA Director Michael Hayden
- White House Press Secretary Robert Gibbs
- Maryland Governor Martin O'Mally
- Baltimore Mayor Stephanie Rawlings-Blake
- President of the World Bank Group Paul Wolfowitz
- United Nations High Commissioner for Human Rights Zeid Raad Al Hussein
- Israeli President Shimon Peres
- South Korean Prime Minister Lee Hong-koo
- French Ambassador to the United Nations Jean David Levitte
- Pakistani Ambassador to the United Nations Maleeha Lodhi
- Turkish Chief of the General Staff İlker Başbuğ
- Ai Wei Wei
- John Yoo
- Edward Snowden
- Chelsea Manning
- Raul Rusesabagina
- Hong Kong pro-democracy activists Joshua Wong, Nathan Law
- Ralph Nader
- Nick J Mosby
- Nadya Tolokonikova
- David Frum
- David Plouffe
- Coalition of Immokalee Workers
- Cornel West
- Linda Sarsour

=== Journalists ===
- Bob Woodward
- Ezra Klein
- Chris Matthews
- Thomas Friedman
- Suroosh Alvi
- Adrian Wooldridge
- Gloria Steinem
- John Micklethwait
- Peter Bergen
- Andrew Ross Sorkin

=== Academia ===
- Francis Fukuyama
- Noam Chomsky
- Reza Aslan
- Joseph Stiglitz
- Aaron Friedberg
- G. John Ikenberry
- Robert Kagan
- Niall Ferguson

=== Business ===
- Ben & Jerry's founder Jerry Greenfield
- Kiva co-founder Jessica Jackley
- Christian Broadcasting Network founder Pat Robertson
- Aneesh Chopra

=== Literature, arts, and media ===
- Brandon Stanton
- Chimamanda Ngozi Adichie
- Jane Evelyn Atwood
- Ron Capps
- Boots Riley
- Xiuhtezcatl Martinez
- Steve McCurry

== See also ==
- Shaw Lectures
