= Heritage Christian Academy (Calgary) =

Christian K-12 school

Coordinates: 51.0921°N 114.0103°W

Heritage Christian Academy (HCA) is non-denominational evangelical Christian K-12 school located in Calgary, Alberta. The school opened as a private school in 1979 as Heritage Christian School and moved to its current location in 1998, changing its name to Heritage Christian Academy. Since 2006, it is publicly funded and operates as an "alternative school program based on Christian values" within the Palliser School District. The school's sports teams are known as the Hawks.

The school courted controversy in 2014 by requiring students and staff to sign agreements vowing to abstain from "sexual immorality" including homosexuality. In 2015, however, HCA announced it would welcome a Gay Straight Alliance in the school.

In 2020, it was given a score of 6.8/10 by the Fraser Institute and ranked 73rd out of 253 schools in the province.

== Notable alumni ==
- Andrew Unger, writer
