= Milton S. Eisenhower Symposium =

Lecture series at Johns Hopkins University

The Milton S. Eisenhower Symposium
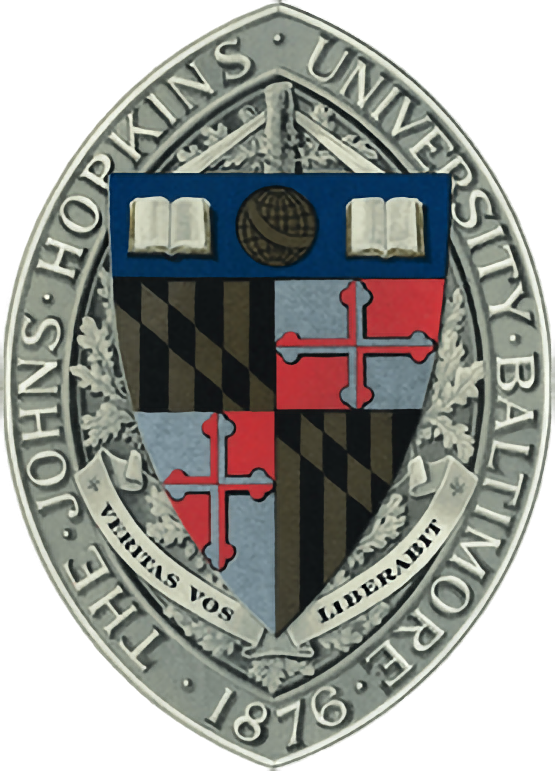
- Genre: Student-run lecture series
- Begins: September
- Ends: December
- Locations: Johns Hopkins University, Baltimore, Maryland
- Inaugurated: 1967
- Attendance: 900 per event
- Organizer: Siena DeMatteo, Taran Krishnan, Mickey Sloat, and Dave Taylor
- Website: www.jhumsesymposium.org

The Milton S. Eisenhower Symposium is a lecture series sponsored by Johns Hopkins University. The Symposium runs each year over the course of the fall semester, as a counterpart to the Foreign Affairs Symposium.

== History ==
Established in 1967, the MSE Symposium is designed to present an issue of national importance to the university in its entirety, as well as to the Baltimore and Washington D.C. communities. The series is named in honor of Milton S. Eisenhower, who served as University President from 1956-1967 and again from 1971-1972. He was the younger brother of U.S. President Dwight D. Eisenhower. The Symposium has established a reputation as a forum for the free exchange of ideas and the analysis of issues at the forefront of the nation’s conscience. All events are free and open to the public.

== Organization and themes ==
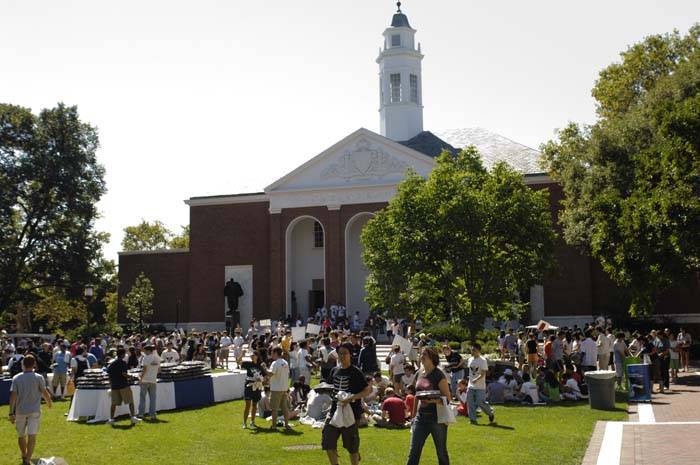
Most events take place in Shriver Hall on the Homewood Campus of the Johns Hopkins University

The Symposium is run entirely by undergraduate students at the University’s Homewood Campus. Symposium events are held on the Homewood Campus of the Johns Hopkins University. Past themes have included Generation Y, the role of the media. sexuality, and the history of cinema.

== See also ==
- Foreign Affairs Symposium
