= Gary Firestein =

American rheumatologist

Gary S. Firestein
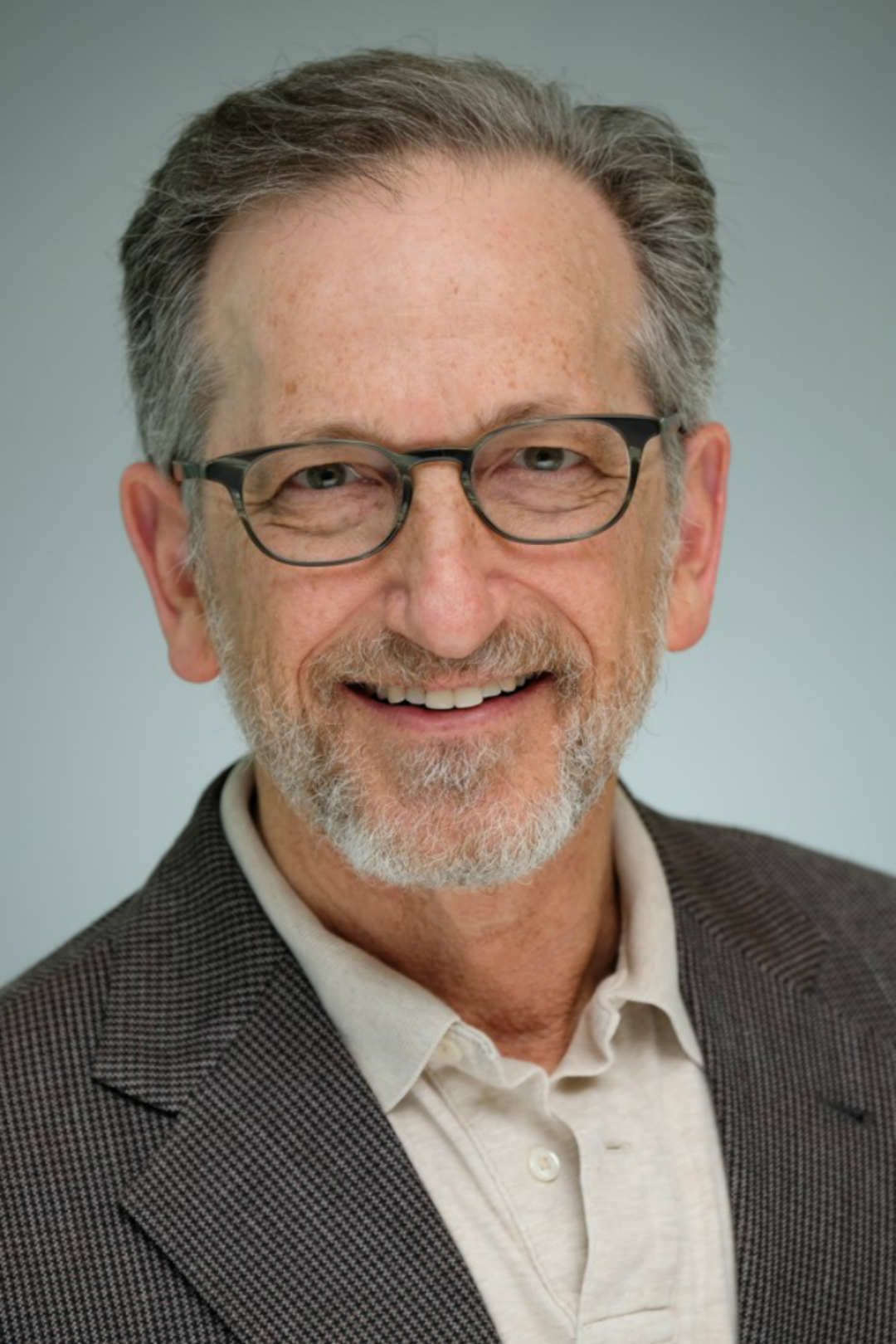
- Dr. Firestein in 2018
- Education: Johns Hopkins University School of Medicine (M.D.) Harvard College (A.B.)
- Awards: Carol-Nachman Prize for Rheumatology, Arthritis Foundation Lee C. Howley Sr. Prize for Arthritis Research, ACR Distinguished Investigator Award, Jane Wyman Humanitarian Award
- Honors: Doctor of Science (hc), University of Glasgow, Master of the American College of Rheumatology, Fellow of the American Association for the Advancement of Science (AAAS)
- Website: https://profiles.ucsd.edu/gary.firestein

Gary S. Firestein is an American rheumatologist, professor, and was founding director of the Altman Clinical and Translational Research Institute (ACTRI) at the University of California San Diego and Senior Associate Vice Chancellor for Health Sciences at University of California, San Diego.

His research focuses on developing novel therapeutic strategies for rheumatoid arthritis.

== Education and career ==
Firestein received his A.B. in chemistry from Harvard College in Cambridge, MA, in 1976 and his M.D. from Johns Hopkins University School of Medicine in Baltimore, MD, in 1980. He completed his residency at the UCLA School of Medicine, followed by two fellowships, one in molecular biology at the Sanford Burnham Prebys Medical Discovery Institute in La Jolla, CA, and one in rheumatology at the University of California San Diego. He is board-certified in internal medicine (1983) and rheumatology (1986).

Firestein joined the faculty at UC San Diego School of Medicine as Assistant Professor of Medicine in 1988. Four years later, he was recruited by Gensia, Inc. to be Director of Immunology where he supervised drug discovery efforts focusing on the potential role of purines in inflammation. In 1996 he was elected to the American Society for Clinical Investigation. That same year, he returned to UC San Diego where he served as Chief of the Division of Rheumatology, Allergy and Immunology from 1998 until 2010. In 2008, he became the Dean of Translational Medicine. In 2010, he became Associate Vice Chancellor of Translational Medicine and Director of the newly established ACTRI, which is funded in part through the NIH Clinical and Translational Science Awards (CTSA) Program. In 2020, the ACTRI was awarded its third consecutive successful NCATS CTSA U54 Award under Firestein's leadership, with an additional $55 M over the next 5 years dedicated to the advancement of clinical and translational science. Dr. Firestein was named Senior Associate Vice Chancellor for Health Sciences in 2020, and he stepped down as director of the ACTRI in 2024.

He is the co-founder of Ignyta, Inc., a biotech company that went public in 2015 and was acquired by Roche in 2018. Its lead drug entrectinib was approved by the US Food and Drug Administration for certain cancers. He is the co-creator of the University of California CTSA consortium called UC BRAID and served as its chairperson from 2013-2015. During his career, Firestein has served as the Principal Investigator on grants totaling more than $150 M in research funding, including numerous NIH and commercial-sponsored research grants and clinical trials.

Firestein has served as editor and then the Editor-in-Chief of Firestein and Kelley’s Textbook of Rheumatology from the 7th through 13th editions. He has written over 400 articles and book chapters, and is past Deputy Editor of Arthritis & Rheumatology.

== Service ==
Dr. Firestein is past chairperson of the FDA Arthritis Advisory Committee and has served on the board of directors of the American College of Rheumatology (ACR), ACR Research and Education Foundation, as chairperson of the ACR Committee on Journal Publications, on the ACR Committee on Research, on the Arthritis Foundation Research Committee, on the board of directors for the Veteran's Medical Research Foundation, and on the NIH National Institute of Arthritis and Musculoskeletal and Skin Diseases (NIAMS) Advisory Council.

== Research and honors ==
Dr. Firestein's research focuses on the pathogenesis of rheumatoid arthritis, and his work contributed to the development of anti-cytokine therapy and signal transduction inhibitors that are now approved for use in many countries. More recently, he mapped the epigenome landscape of rheumatoid arthritis and used novel informatics tools to identify pathogenic pathways and novel therapeutic targets. Dr. Firestein was also the first to use percutaneous synovial biopsies to evaluate drug mechanism of action in arthritis and demonstrated that somatic mutation could increase joint damage in rheumatoid arthritis. More recently, his research has included studies to evaluate immune dysfunction in individuals at risk for developing rheumatoid arthritis. His Google Scholar H index is 119 with over 64,000 citations. Firestein has received the Carol-Nachman Prize for Rheumatology, the Arthritis Foundation Lee C. Howley Sr. Prize for Arthritis Research, the ACR Distinguished Investigator Award, the Jane Wyman Humanitarian Award, and was named a Master of the American College of Rheumatology and a Fellow of the American Association for the Advancement of Science (AAAS). He has been elected to the American Society for Clinical Investigation and the Association of American Physicians. Dr. Firestein received a Doctor of Science (hc) from University of Glasgow in June 2019.

== Personal ==
He is married to Linda Lyons Firestein, M.D., and they have a son (David Jonathan Firestein) and a daughter (Catherine Elizabeth Firestein, M.D., M.P.H.). Dr. Firestein has enjoyed surfing around the world and plays bluegrass music on the banjo.
