= Ron Capps =

American writer

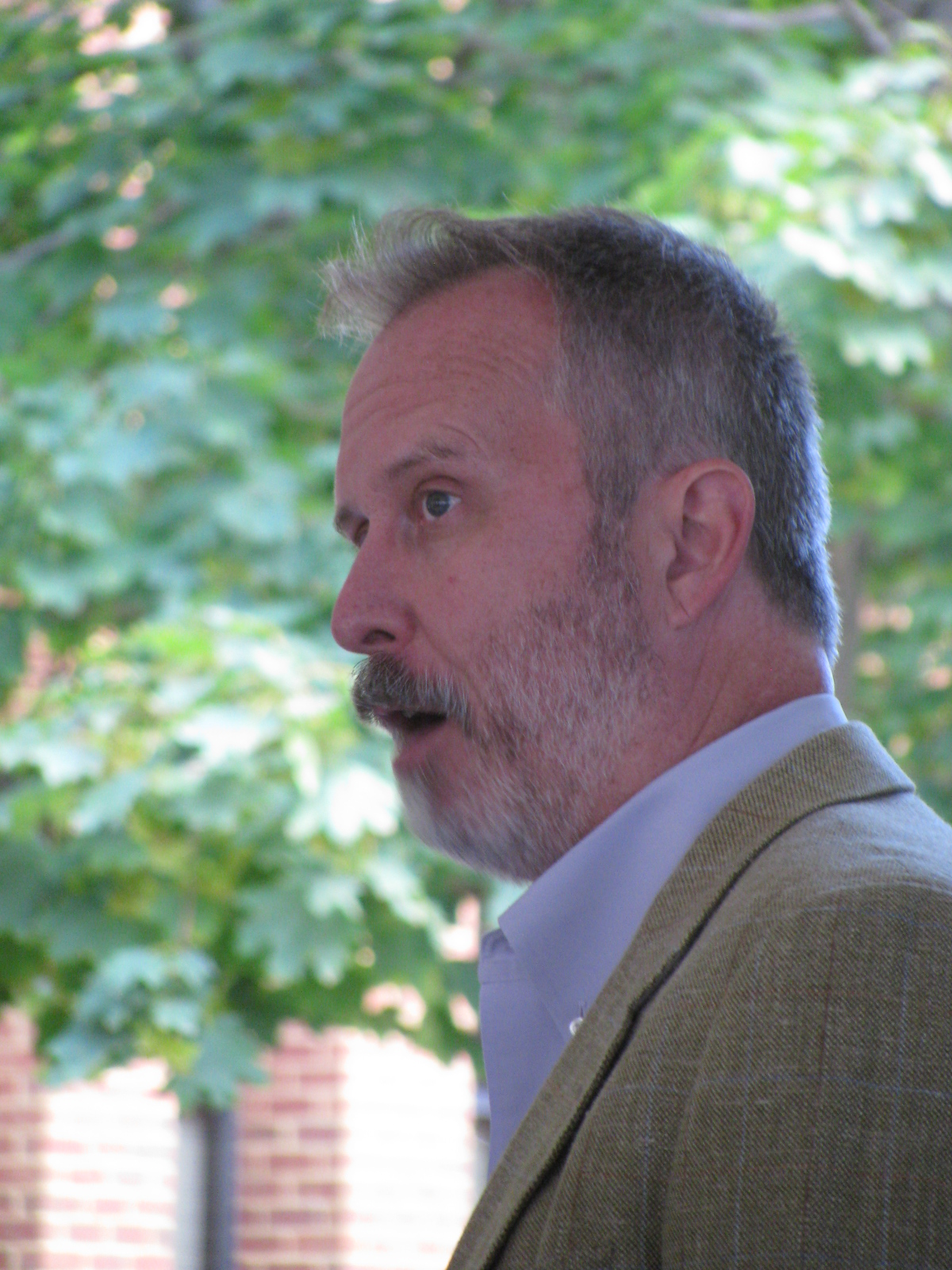
- at Fall for the Book, 2014
- Military career
- Allegiance: United States
- Branch: United States Army, State Department
- Service years: 1983–2008
- Rank: Army: Lieutenant Colonel; Foreign Service: FO-01
- Other work: Writer, Veterans Writing Project founder

Ron Capps is a writer, US Army and Foreign Service veteran, and founder of the Veterans Writing Project, a nonprofit organization that hosts free writing workshops for veterans and others. Capps also wrote the book Seriously Not All Right: Five Wars in Ten Years, a book that details his own experiences with PTSD (Posttraumatic stress disorder).

== Service career ==
Capps enrolled in ROTC and enlisted in the Virginia Army National Guard simultaneously while attending Old Dominion University in 1983. He graduated with a Bachelor of Arts in English in 1985. In 1986, he joined the 11th Armored Cavalry Regiment in Germany. After three years, Capps moved to military intelligence work in Korea, serving as a US liaison to the Korean Defense Intelligence Agency and later in the 5/17th Cavalry squadron of the Second Infantry Division.

Capps returned to the United States and trained at Camp Peary as an Army case officer, and earned a Master of Arts in Liberal Arts from Johns Hopkins University. In 1994, Capps transferred to the Army Reserve and joined the State Department as a Foreign Service Officer.

From 1996 to 2002, he served in Cameroon, the Central African Republic, Kosovo, and Rwanda as a Foreign Service officer. Additionally during those six years, Capps was deployed as an intelligence officer in Uganda and Zaire by the army. After the September 11 attacks, Capps served with XVIII Airborne Corps and the Defense intelligence Agency in Afghanistan as a soldier. Later, he was deployed to Darfur and Chad as a soldier, and Iraq and Darfur as a Foreign Service officer.

Throughout his career of service, Capps was often working in close proximity to murder, rape, and genocide. He suffered from regular and intense nightmares; he was diagnosed by an Army psychiatrist with PTSD and depression, and prescribed Prozac. In 2006, he nearly committed suicide. He was medically evacuated from service by the Regional Medical Officer of the State Department.

== After deployment ==
After his medevac, Capps returned to the State Department as an expert on Darfur and Chad. He retired from government work and began pursuing a Master of Arts in Writing from Johns Hopkins University in 2009.

Three years later, he founded the Veterans Writing Project. The non-profit organization hosts free writing workshops and seminars for veterans and service members, as well as their adult family members.

Capps often writes freelance articles about PTSD. His work has been published in Time Magazine, NPR, and the New York Times, among others. He published his first book, Seriously Not All Right: Five Wars in Ten Years in 2014. It outlines his experiences with PTSD and his service during wars in Central Africa, Kosovo, Afghanistan, Iraq, and Darfur.

== Awards and recognition ==
Capps has had three essays listed as notable in Best American Essays: in 2012, 2014, and 2015. His essay Writing My Way Home received special recognition in the 2015 Pushcart Prizes. His essay The French Lieutenant's iPod, was selected (by Bill Rorbach) as first prize winner in Press 53's Annual Awards for 2011.

In April 2017, Capps and the non-profit he founded, the Veterans Writing Project, received the Anne Smedinghoff Award from the Johns Hopkins University Foreign Affairs Symposium.

In 2007, Capps received the American Foreign Service Association's William R. Rivkin award for "intellectual courage and the creative use of dissent in foreign policy.” The award was presented in recognition of a State Department cable Capps wrote while serving as a political officer at Embassy Khartoum that questioned U.S. government policy in Darfur. The cable, titled "Darfur: Who Will Apologize," was classified as confidential, but was nonetheless leaked to blogger Eric Reeves who included parts of it in a long blog post. Capps provided a copy of a draft version of the cable to researcher Rebecca Hamilton who mentioned it in her book, Fighting for Darfur: Public Action and the Struggle to Stop Genocide. A copy of Capps's notes are posted on the National Security Archive's website.

According to the website for his book, Seriously Not All Right: Five Wars in Ten Years, Capps is "a recipient of the Bronze Star Medal with oak leaf cluster, and was twice presented Department of State Superior Honor Awards. He was named an Exceptional Collector of Human Intelligence by the Director of Central Intelligence in 1997, and a Distinguished Analyst by the Director of National Intelligence in 2008."

== Publications ==
- Capps, Ron (2014). Seriously Not All Right: Five Wars in Ten Years. Schaffner Press, Inc. ISBN 9781936182589. OCLC 862098859.
- Capps, Ron (2013). Writing War: a Guide to Telling Your Own Story. Veterans Writing Project. ISBN 9781466435025. OCLC 825050133.
