= Heritage Christian Academy (New Jersey) =

Coordinates: 39.95470°N 74.89733°W

- 530 Union Mill Road; Mount Laurel, NJ 08054

Information
- Type: Private school
- Motto: Distinctly Different by Design
- Established: 1988
- NCES School ID: 00868597
- Administrator: Ronald Hamilton
- Faculty: 9.0 FTEs
- Grades: K–12
- Enrollment: 43 (as of 2013-14, plus 3 in PreK)
- Student to teacher ratio: 4.8:1
- Colors: Blue and white
- Website: hca.heritageministries.com

Heritage Christian Academy (HCA) is a private Christian school located in Mount Laurel, New Jersey, United States. Heritage Christian Academy opened in 1988 as a ministry of Heritage Baptist Church under the leadership of its founder, Darrell W. Smith. Heritage Christian Academy is a member of the Garden State Association of Christian Schools (GSACS) and the American Association of Christian Schools (AACS). The goal of Heritage Christian Academy is to train students in truth and righteousness leading the students toward Christ-likeness and to uphold the Christian family.

As of the 2013-14 school year, the school had an enrollment of 43 students (plus 3 in PreK) and 9.0 classroom teachers (on an FTE basis), for a student–teacher ratio of 4.8:1. The school's enrollment was 41.9% White, 30.2% Black, 4.7% Hispanic, 16.3% Asian and 7.0% two or more races.

== Athletics ==
Students in grades seven through twelve have the opportunity to participate in the sports program at Heritage Christian Academy. Heritage Christian Academy offers soccer and basketball for boys and volleyball for girls. Basketball for girls will be included in the future.

== Academics ==
Heritage Christian Academy uses the curriculum developed by Bob Jones University Press. The kindergarten students take Bible, math, phonics, and music. The first through sixth grade students take classes in Bible, science, heritage studies, math, and phonics (for first grade only), English, reading, handwriting, spelling, and music. The seventh through twelfth grade students take Bible, science, heritage studies, mathematics, writing, grammar, literature, vocabulary, and foreign language. Each class has its own webpage.
