= Hopkins Consulting Agency =

Student-run company at Johns Hopkins University

- Company type: Private
- Industry: Consulting, Technology Commercialization, Business Plan Preparation
- Founded: 2006
- Founder: Alex Nisichenko
- Headquarters: Baltimore, MD, USA
- Area served: Nationwide
- Key people: Josiah Tsui (Enterprise Manager); Saumya Gurbani (Assistant Manager); Pam Arrington (Chair, Board of Directors)
- Revenue: Private
- Number of employees: < 20
- Parent: Hopkins Student Enterprises, The Johns Hopkins University
- Website: www.jhu.edu/hca

Hopkins Consulting Agency (HCA), formerly known as "Hopkins Technology Commercialization Agency" (HTCA), is an entirely student-run non-profit business and technology consulting company based at the Johns Hopkins University Homewood Campus. HCA was founded in 2006 and provides technology commercialization services and business plan preparation services to universities, federal research labs, engineering firms, and independent entrepreneurs and inventors.

== History ==
HCA was founded in 2006 by Alex Nisichenko, Johns Hopkins University 2007. The company was founded as Hopkins Technology Commercialization Agency (HTCA) and focused on preparing technology commercialization assessment reports for universities, federal research labs, and small engineering firms. At the time, the company was the nation's first entirely student-run technology commercialization agency.

In 2008, under the leadership of former Enterprise Manager Riaz Virani the company began broadening its services to include business consulting and business plan preparation. In 2009, former Enterprise Manager Kieran Gupta continued to diversify the company's services and successfully re-branded the company as Hopkins Consulting Agency (HCA) to better represent the broad set of services now offered by the company. As a result of this diversification, by the middle of 2010 approximately half of HCA's business was in the form of business consulting and business plan preparation.

== Company Structure ==
Hopkins Consulting Agency is directly affiliated with and owned by Johns Hopkins University. The parent company is Hopkins Student Enterprises (HSE), a student group that resides within the Center for Leadership Education (CLE), a department under the Whiting School of Engineering at Johns Hopkins University.

== Services ==
Hopkins Consulting Agency has two primary service offerings:

1. Technology Commercialization Assessment Reports

- Comprehensive research and consulting reports designed to assist research labs, engineering firms, and private inventors make informed decisions about their intellectual property.

2. Business Plans

- Complete reports for small businesses and entrepreneurs that can be used to support an existing company or assist in the acquisition of startup funding and grants.

HCA differentiates itself by providing a high-level of personalization and customization in its reports through constant communication with the client throughout the report-writing process. In addition, because the company maintains very low overhead costs and a full team of student employees, HCA has significantly lower expenses than other consulting firms and can thus charge clients at a steep discount rate.

== Board of directors ==
Although Hopkins Consulting Agency is autonomously managed and operated by students, the company has a Board of Directors composed of full-time faculty and staff of The Johns Hopkins University. The primary function of the Board of Directors is to oversee operations of the company and provide advice on company direction and development.

- Pam Arrington - Academic Program Coordinator, Center for Leadership Education. Pam coordinates payroll for all company employees.
- James Wells - Budget Analyst, Center for Leadership Education. James oversees the company budget and provides annual analysis reports detailing the current state of finances for the company.
- Prof. Lawrence Aronhime - Senior Lecturer, Center for Leadership Education. Prof. Aronhime leverages his years of experience in the management industry to advise on company direction, business practices, and marketing.
- Dr. Andrew Douglas - Vice Dean for Faculty, Whiting School of Engineering. Dr. Douglas helps to facilitate communications between the company and the Whiting School of Engineering.

== Notable clients ==
- The Johns Hopkins Medical Institutions (JHMI)
- The Whiting School of Engineering (WSE)
- The Applied Physics Laboratory (APL)
- The United States Army Medical Research and Materiel Command (USAMRMC)
- Himalayan Children's Charities (HCC)
- Center for Educational Resources (CER) at Johns Hopkins

== Past enterprise managers ==
The following students of the Johns Hopkins University have served as Enterprise Manager of Hopkins Consulting Agency.

Term	Enterprise Manager	Significant Contributions	Future Career
2006–2007	Alex Nisichenko	Founded original Hopkins Technology Commercialization Agency	Research Assistant at the MIT Abdul Latif Jameel Poverty Action Lab
2006–2007	Sudhir Khetan	Co-Founder	Researcher in bioengineering at the University of Pennsylvania
2007–2008	Andrew Boudreau	Member of founding team	Consultant at Invotex Group, Maryland First Financial Services Corp.
2008–2009	Riaz Virani	Diversified company's services	Analyst at Deloitte Consulting Firm
2009–2010	Kieran Gupta	Rebranded company as Hopkins Consulting Agency	Program Manager at Microsoft Business Division
2010–2011	Saumya Gurbani	Established relations with the Carey Business School and created the Consulting Seminar Series; expanded HCA's services to include business plan preparation for startup ventures.	MSE candidate in biomedical engineering at Whiting School of Engineering and an ORISE Fellow at the Food and Drug Administration
2011–2012	Josiah Tsui		--
