= Heritage Christian Academy (Colorado) =

Private school in Colorado, United States

Location
- 2506 Zurich Drive; Fort Collins, Colorado 80524; United States
- 40°35′24″N 105°2′0″W

Information
- Type: Private
- Motto: Academic Excellence. Nurturing environment. Authentic faith.
- Established: 1970 (56 years ago)
- CEEB code: 060585
- Head of school: Michael Cuckler
- Grades: PreK–12
- Colors: Forest green, black, white
- Athletics conference: Mile High League
- Mascot: Eagle
- Website: www.heritagechristian.info

Heritage Christian Academy is an independent, private, non-denominational Christian K–12 school in Fort Collins, Colorado, United States, with grades pre-kindergarten (four years old) through twelfth grade. It was formed by families and educators committed to making available a nonsectarian, Christian education in the Northern Colorado region.

Heritage Christian Academy is accredited by and a member of the Association of Christian Schools International (ACSI).

== History ==
Heritage Christian Academy is an independent, non-denominational Christian school, serving grades Pre-K through 12. The school is incorporated in the state of Colorado as a non-profit organization, under the direction of a nine-member board of directors. Founded in 1970 by three local churches, HCA opened its doors to fifty-six students, four teachers, and one administrator under the name Heritage Christian School. Today, Heritage is supported by the Heritage Christian Foundation, is fully accredited, and has over two hundred students.

== Curriculum ==
HCA uses a curriculum that emphasizes a Christian world and life view. The school employs the Principle Approach teaching method, which places principles found in the Bible, such as the principle of self government, at the center of each subject.

=== Athletic achievements ===
The HCA boys' basketball team won the Mile High League regular season title in 2009 and advanced to the state tournament, where they captured the consolation trophy.

The HCA track and field boys and girls' teams were both represented at State in their very first year (spring 2013), with the boys' team winning first place and the girls' team placing fourth. In the next season (spring 2014) both teams placed high again with the boys' team taking their second championship in a row, and the girls' team taking second. In the spring 2015 season the men's team took a step back, finishing fourth, but the women's team was able to secure their first championship. At the next State meet (spring 2016) both the men's and women's teams were able to win championships. This past season, at the State Meet, the men finished first with the women's team taking third.
