= Heritage Christian Academy (Minnesota) =

Coordinates: 45°04′54.3″N 93°28′45.8″W

- Maple Grove, Minnesota; United States

Information
- Type: Private
- Established: 1981
- Founder: Beverly Enderlein
- CEEB code: 242-202
- President: Tonya Scott
- Athletics conference: Christian Athletic Association
- Mascot: Eagles
- Website: www.heritageweb.org

Heritage Christian Academy is a private Christian school which educates children from Kindergarten Development class for three-year-olds through the high school grades. It is an outreach ministry of Grace Free Lutheran Church, formerly Medicine Lake Lutheran Church, to the Christian community (students from 80 different area churches attend this school).

Heritage Christian Academy was founded in 1981 by members of Medicine Lake Lutheran Church as Medicine Lake Lutheran Academy. The school's first president was Mrs. Beverly Enderlein. She retired in 2006, after 25 years as president. The current president is Mrs. Tonya Scott. In 2002, the name Medicine Lake Lutheran Academy was changed to Heritage Christian Academy.

In January 2003, Heritage Christian Academy opened the doors of its new facility in Maple Grove, where it now houses Kindergarten Development through 12th grades.

Heritage Christian Academy is a member of the Association of Christian Schools International, the same organization through which accreditation is being pursued.

The Heritage girls' volleyball team made history in 2015 when they won the section 4A tournament and advanced to the Class A state tournament, where they got third place.

The volleyball team won the section 4A tournament and proceeded to state again in 2016, where they placed fourth.

== Notable alumni ==
- Seth Halvorsen, MLB baseball player
