= Heritage Christian Academy (Kansas) =

Private Christian School in Overland Park and Olathe, Kansas

Coordinates: 38°50′18″N 94°41′36″W

- 16000 S Black Bob Rd, Olathe, KS 66062

Information
- School type: Private Christian
- Religious affiliation: Christian / PCA
- Established: 2010
- Oversight: Redeemer Presbyterian Church
- Head of school: Ben Hummel
- Grades: Pre-K - 12
- Athletics conference: Kaw Valley Conference
- Sports: Fall: Cross Country, Girls Volleyball, Boys Soccer Winter: Basketball, Cheerleading Spring: Track and Field, Baseball, Girls Soccer, Boys Golf
- Mascot: Chargers
- Rival: Kansas City Christian School
- Accreditation: Association of Christian Schools International (ACSI)
- Tuition: $6,200-$10,890
- Website: https://hcakc.org/

Heritage Christian Academy is a private Christian school with campuses in Overland Park, Kansas and Olathe, Kansas. It serves pre-kindergarten through grade 12.

== History ==
=== History of Berean Christian School ===
Berean Christian Academy was formed in the year 1974 by Berean Christian Church members Glen and Norma Adams. In 2003, Berean Christian School acquired 20 acres of land on the southwest corner of 159th and Black Bob Road that would be the future site of the new campus for the school. The building was completed in the year 2004 and housed the school, pre-kindergarten through grade 12.

=== History of Westminster Christian Academy ===
Westminster Christian Academy was formed as Westminster Academy in the year 1996 by Redeemer Presbyterian Church in a farmhouse at the back of Redeemer's property near the intersection of 159th and Antioch. In 2005, Westminster changed its name to Westminster Christian Academy. When the opportunity arose to merge with Berean in 2009, Westminster had grades pre-kindergarten through grade 10.

=== Merger ===
In 2009, Berean and Westminster entered into talks to combine the two schools. The 2010 school year was the first year of Heritage Christian Academy.

== Campuses ==
=== West Campus ===
The West Campus is located at 16000 Black Bob Road in Olathe, Kansas. The West Campus houses 6th through 12th grade. Facilities include a gym, weight room, worship center, science lab, the school office, and 19 classrooms. In 2018, construction completed on a new addition to the west side of the building. The addition includes 6 new classrooms, a maker space, STEM lab, and a black box theater.

=== East Campus ===
The East Campus is located at 9333 W 159th St in Overland Park, Kansas. It houses pre-kindergarten through 5th grade.

=== Baseball Field ===
The Heritage Christian Academy Baseball Team practices and plays at the Virginia Sue Field of Dreams located on the southwest corner of 183rd St and Pflumm Rd. This field is not owned by the school, but is used almost exclusively by the HCA Baseball Program.

== Sports ==
In 2012, HCA gained accreditation through the Association of Christian Schools International (ACSI) and became a full member of Kansas State High School Activities Association (KSHSAA).

=== Junior High ===
Boys' sports include soccer, cross country, basketball, and track. Girls' sports include soccer, cross country, basketball, and track.

=== Senior High ===
Boys' sports include soccer, basketball, track, cross country, golf, and baseball. Girls' sports include soccer, basketball, track, cross country, volleyball, and cheerleading.
