= Heritage Christian Academy (Texas) =

Heritage Christian Academy†

Location
- 1408 S Goliad Street; Rockwall, Texas 75087; United States; 32.9147°N 96.4563°W

Information
- Type: Private
- Motto: Christ Centered, College Preparatory, Family Focused
- Established: 1995
- Head of school: Brad Helmer, Ed. D.
- Grades: PreK3 - 12
- Colors: Red and Black
- Athletics conference: TAPPS 3-A
- Mascot: Eagle
- Website: hcarockwall.org

Heritage Christian Academy is a private K-12 Christian school located in Rockwall, Texas. Founded in 1995, it offers grades Pre-K3-12th. The school is accredited by the Association of Christian Schools International (ACSI) and the Accreditation Commission of the Texas Association of Baptist Schools (ACTABS).
