= Richmond County Country Club =

Country club in New York City

Coordinates: 40.5885°N 74.1049°W

- Interactive map of Richmond County Country Club

Club information
- Location: Staten Island, New York, U.S.
- Established: 1888
- Type: private
- Total holes: 18
- Tournaments: Staten Island Amateur (annually)
- Website: www.richmondcountycc.org
- Designed by: Robert W. White
- Par: 71
- Length: 6,559 yards (Black)
- Course rating: 72.4
- Slope rating: 137

Richmond County Country Club (RCCC) is a private country club in Staten Island, New York. The club includes a golf course, tennis courts, an aquatic facility, and two clubhouses. The golf course and the main clubhouse have impressive views of New York Harbor, the Atlantic Ocean, and the New Jersey highlands. For more than a century Richmond County has been the only private county club in New York City and is one of the oldest in the United States.

== History ==
Richmond County Country Club was organized on April 18, 1888 by Clarence Whitman, W. Henry Motley, Adolph J. Outerbridge, Gugy M. Irving, Wethered B. Thomas, and Eugene H. Outerbridge. The club was officially incorporated in 1891. Richmond County Hunt Club had formed in 1887, and some of their members established RCCC to provide a place where people could socialize while participating in fox hunting and other sports that would eventually include golf and lawn tennis. For years Richmond County Hunt Club operated in close affiliation with RCCC sharing social activities and facilities.

RCCC was founded in the same year as The Saint Andrews Golf Club in Hastings-on-Hudson, New York. St. Andrew's is one of the founding members of the United States Golf Association (USGA) and is considered the oldest continuously operating golf club in the United States.

In 1901 RCCC had four classes of membership: Resident, Non-resident, Associate, and Summer. Summer members were permitted to join for 5 months only without an initiation fee. Resident and Non-resident membership had an initiation fee of $30, with the annual dues of $50 for Residents and $25 for Non-residents. Summer members paid dues of $35.

=== Original location ===
RCCC's original location was on the grounds of the former Vanderbilt estate, near Ocean Terrace and Little Clove Road on Staten Island, utilizing property that was owned by the Wittemann family. A two-story Victorian house was used as the clubhouse. When the club incorporated in 1891 it had over 60 members. In 1906, after the club moved, Charles Rudolph Wittemann established Wittemann Aeronautical Engineers and built the world's first commercial airplane manufacturing plant at the location.

=== Golf ===
Golf began at RCCC in 1894 led by club members George Hunter, George Armstrong, and James Park. The three members, who were all from England, had played golf at Harbor Hills Golf Course in New Brighton, which had opened in 1878, while visiting the island the previous year. At the time, Staten Island was a retreat for people living in the New York metropolitan area. Hunter and Armstrong were members at St. Andrew's, and had participated in one of the two "National Amateur Championship" that were conducted in 1894. Hunter, Armstrong, and Park designed a 9-hole course near the clubhouse, and Hunter donated a golf championship medal to the club. This medal has been awarded every year to the winner of the RCCC club championship qualifier since 1895, and remains one of the oldest commemoratives used continuously in American golf.

In 1897, RCCC moved to its present location in Dongan Hills (also known at the time as Garretson), near Todt Hill, to accommodate the rising interest in golf. Member and property owner George Cromwell allocated land that was north of Four Corners Road on which the club built a nine-hole golf course. A year later, nine more holes were added on land rented from Cromwell that was routed away from the original nine. The new nine became known as the Meadow Holes. It was noted in the New York Times in 1898 that Albert E. Paterson won the opening day tournament with a score of 83.

The early course totaled 5,175 yards, "with bogie figured at 77" and covered about 90 acres. The golf course's signature hole was the same hole as the current signature hole, the short par 3 third hole with a drop of over 100 feet from the tee to the green. In 1901, Paterson, who held the Hunter Medal at the time, was the owner of the amateur course record of 80 and Harry Vardon held the professional record of 71. At the time, the golf course scorecard looked as follows:

Richmond County Country Club (1901)
Tee	Rating/Slope	1	2	3	4	5	6	7	8	9	Out	10	11	12	13	14	15	16	17	18	In	Total
Par	Men/Women	5	4	3	4	4	4	4	6	5	38	4	5	4	4	4	5	6	4	3	39	77
Member	N/A	426	254	112	238	249	252	155	469	380	2535	219	290	318	308	229	385	480	267	144	2640	5175

Scorecard note: Bogey is considered PAR.

The New York Tribune published a description of each hole, highlights of which included:

- The 1st hole is known as "The Bay" on account of the fine view of the water. The ground slopes slightly to the right and the only notable hazard is a road 235 yards from the tee, which much be carried on the second shot. The green is terraced at the back and to the right, making judgment necessary in approaching it.
- The 3rd is one of the distinctive features of the course, and though jocosely dubbed "Wee Drop", is in reality a descent of 100 feet in 112 yards.
- On the 9th the bunker is only 85 yards out, but a road must be crossed on the second shot, and the bogie of 5 must be regarded as a fair one.
- 16th Now comes the longest hole on the course, "The Highlands", 480 yards from tee to green.
- 18th The home hole is only 144 yards long, but it requires the accurate play to cover it successfully in 3, the bogie figure. The first 50 yards is over an abandoned mine dump. A line of trees skirting the road will catch a slice, but a straight drive of 125 yards will lay the ball on the green, and will enable the player to equal bogie.

On October 13, 1901, the New York Tribune described RCCC's location as "a 10 minute ride on the Midland Railway from the St. George ferry. Three-quarters of a mile away is Midland Beach, in plain view from the clubhouse, and the trolley service has been thus proved excellent for members running down from Manhattan for an afternoon's outing on the links."

In 1908, the original nine holes north of Four Corners Road were abandoned and sold as home sites, and the club bought additional land from which an 18-hole golf course on Todt Hill Road would be completed. In 1916, the current course layout was designed by Robert White, the first President of the Professional Golfers' Association of America. In 1947, White was a founding member of the American Society of Golf Course Architects.

In 1956 the 1st and 18th holes were par threes. The holes were laid out in 1916 to replace the longer 1st and 9th holes of the 1898 course. The par threes were created to eliminate the need to hit shots over Todt Hill Road. But golfers were still required to walk across the road to play the 2nd hole (today's 4th hole) and at the completion of the 17th hole (today's 3rd hole). In the 1950s, increased traffic was becoming an issue and the land used for both holes on the clubhouse side of Todt Hill Road was sold. The par threes were replaced by the current 11th and 12th holes. The land sale created some distance between RCCC's clubhouse and the golf course so a modern facility was built at the course to support all golf activities.

The club's 124-acre golf course adjoins the domain of the Staten Island Greenbelt. The 10th and 11th holes skirt the mapped right-of-way, but never built, portion of the Willowbrook Parkway which was cancelled in the 1970s due to its impact on the Greenbelt. In 1989, the State of New York substantiated its commitment to the Greenbelt by purchasing the golf course, and then gave RCCC a 99-year lease for the land at a cost of $1 annually.

In 2006, RCCC began working with golf course architects Ron Prichard, and Tyler Rae. With their help RCCC created a master plan that included deepening bunkers, expanding greens, and adjusting mounding. In 2018, the 17th and 18th holes were redesigned to lengthen the course and to take advantage of the golf course's topography capturing views of earlier versions of the golf course.

==== Staten Island Amateur ====
The Staten Island Amateur was first played in 1899 and was conducted each year at either RCCC or Fox Hills Golf Club, which had opened in 1900. The tournament was played through 1926. Through those years almost all participants were from one of the two clubs, and those who had duel memberships declared which club they were representing when submitting their application. The tournament started again in 1950 and has been played each year at RCCC. Bill Britton a tournament winner on the PGA Tour played in the championship twice before turning pro and won each time, defeating his brother Bob both times.

=== Clubhouse ===
In 1897, George Cromwell, who would soon become Staten Island's first borough president, assisted with the club's purchase of an estate on Todt Hill that included a large stately home. RCCC's clubhouse, known as the Alexander House, is a rare surviving antebellum mansion on Staten Island. It was built on 36 rolling acres in the 1840s or 1850s and originally attributed to Agatha Mayer (or Meyer). When the club bought the house, one side featured large stone retaining walls while the other side of the house had extensive grass lawns. The residence was owned by Junius Alexander who named the house “Effingham” after his family origins in Virginia. Mr. Alexander, who made money on Wall Street and through his railroad connections, lived with his family in the home from 1878 until his death in 1893 enjoying the views his property gave him of New York Harbor.

=== Tennis ===
Lawn tennis was growing in popularity in the 1890s. Americans had been introduced to the sport on Staten Island in the 1870s by Mary Ewing Outerbridge, a woman from a well known family in Bermuda, who had two brothers who were RCCC founders. One of these brothers, Eugene Outerbridge, was part of a small group of men who came together to establish the United States Lawn Tennis Association in 1881. In September 1880, the first American national tennis championship had been organized and played at the Staten Island Cricket and Baseball Club (now known as the Staten Island Cricket Club). In 1899, RCCC members took advantage of the lawns that surrounded the clubhouse to create quality grass tennis courts. In the early part of the 20th century RCCC summer members included International Tennis Hall of Fame member Robert "Bob" Wrenn, a winner of four United States singles tennis championships and future president of the United States Tennis Association; his brother, George Wrenn; and Arthur E. Foote, a winner of the New England tennis championship.

Today, RCCC's Tennis Pavilion includes eight Har-Tru courts; a spa-like lounge, and a Pro Shop staffed with United States Professional Tennis Association (USPTA) professionals.

=== Fox hunting ===
RCCC was originally established to maintain a pack of hounds and to hunt fox, and quickly became one of the top hunt clubs in the area. But as the popularity of golf and tennis grew, and homes started to be built around Staten Island, fox hunting became impractical and was ceased in 1915. RCCC sent the club's English fox hounds to New Jersey where they were given to Monmouth County Hunt which had been operating since 1885.

== Club culture ==
=== Dress code ===
To maintain its standards as a privileged and exclusive establishment, the club, like many other older clubs, has a strict dress code with a detailed schedule of rules on what may be worn where and when.

== Course description ==
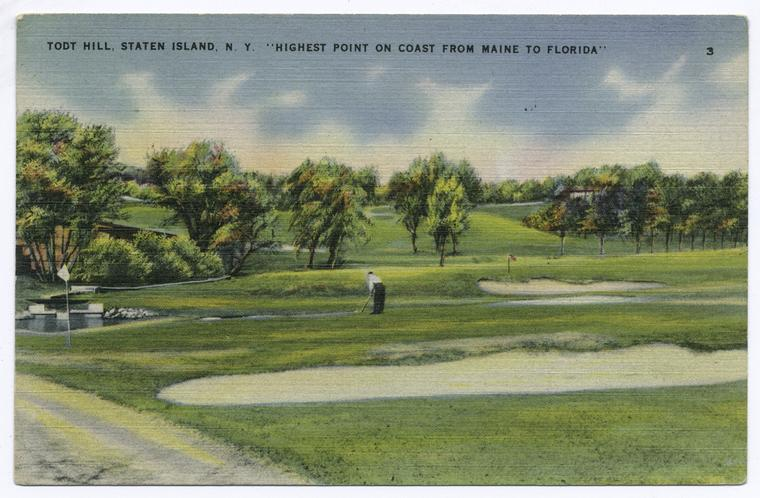
Todt Hill postcard with player on the 3rd green, in front of the 5th green and the 9th green at the "highest point" on top of the hill in the background.

RCCC's golf course routing is out and back, i.e. once you leave the 1st tee you will not return to the clubhouse until you reach the 18th green. There is a half-way house near the 10th green and the 13th tee. The course has a number of elevation changes with the front 9 eventually working its way close to the top of Todt Hill, the highest point along the American Atlantic seaboard south of the State of Maine. The 10th tee offers a view of the surrounding area.

The golf course has small to medium size greens, some of which have multiple plateaus. The rolling topography and the course's proximity to New York Harbor make for some interesting putting challenges.

Club member Ernest Flagg was considered one of the world's leading architects while he lived on Staten Island. He owned a large amount of land on Todt Hill, especially near the grounds of RCCC. Flagg was noted for his unique designs in which he used serpentine rock that was quarried from Todt Hill. The remains of one quarry can be seen below you as you move from the 2nd green to the 3rd tee. Many of the homes near RCCC, along Todt Hill Road and Flagg Place, were built using the quarried serpentine. St. Charles Seminary, a large mansion like structure near RCCC's main clubhouse, was Flagg's home.

== Course scorecard 2017 ==
Richmond County Country Club (2017)
Tee	Rating/Slope	1	2	3	4	5	6	7	8	9	Out	10	11	12	13	14	15	16	17	18	In	Total
Par	Men/Women	4	4	3	4	3	4/5	5	4	4	35/36	5	4	4	3	4	4	4	4	4	36	71/72
Black	M:72.6/138	318	350	165	322	240	407	498	304	368	2972	635	436	312	197	414	405	374	380	434	3587	6559
Maroon	M:70.9/134 W:77.2/142	300	337	133	310	223	400	484	296	352	2835	600	420	300	182	395	395	350	363	414	3419	6254
Gold	M:67.7/124 W:73.8/132	290	305	120	305	200	400	420	296	251	2587	468	373	275	140	355	376	335	353	381	3056	5643
Silver	M:66.3/123 W:71.2/127	272	275	84	245	180	390	420	251	251	2368	468	373	275	135	345	340	280	265	354	2862	5230
SI	Men/Women	16	4	14	12	10	2	8	18	6		3	7	15	17	1	9	13	5	11

== Notable members ==
- Howard Randolph Bayne
- George Cromwell
- John Eberhard Faber, Jr.
- Ernest Flagg
- Arthur E. Foote
- James Tayloe Gwathmey
- Eugenius Harvey Outerbridge
- Cornelius Vanderbilt IV
- Clarence Whitman
- Charles Rudolph Wittemann
- George Wrenn
- Robert Wrenn
