= Outerbridge =

Outerbridge is an English surname derived from the village of Oughtibridge in Bradfield, South Yorkshire. It is also used as a given name. Outerbridge is the surname of a family in Bermuda, present there since 1620, and described by Time magazine as "among the oldest and most eminent" on the island and "distinguished and numerous". The family later spread to the United States and Canada, with a branch returning to Great Britain.

== People with the surname ==
- Eugenius Harvey Outerbridge (1860–1932), American businessman, chairman of the Port of New York Authority and namesake of the Outerbridge Crossing
- Frances Olive Outerbridge (1846-1934), nurse and British suffragette
- Sir Joseph Outerbridge (1843-1933), prominent Bermudian business man and philanthropist in Newfoundland (brother of Eugenius Harvey Outerbridge)
- Sir Leonard Outerbridge (1888-1986), Lieutenant Governor of Newfoundland (son of Sir Joseph Outerbridge)
- Mary Ewing Outerbridge (1852–1886), American woman who imported the lawn game tennis to the US from Bermuda (sister of Sir Joseph Outerbridge and Eugenius Harvey Outerbridge)
- Paul Outerbridge (1896–1958), American photographer
- Peter Outerbridge (born 1966), Canadian actor
- Steven Outerbridge, Bermudian cricketer
- Thomas Leslie Outerbridge (died 1927), Bermudian sailor, participant in the American Civil War
- Willets Outerbridge, American sailor
- William W. Outerbridge (1906–1986), commanded USS Ward in the first U.S. naval action of the Attack on Pearl Harbor

== People with the given name ==
- Outerbridge Horsey (1777–1842), American lawyer and politician
- Outerbridge Horsey (diplomat) (1910–1983), American diplomat

== See also ==
- Outerbridge Peppers, a food company based in Bermuda
- Outerbridge Reach, a 1992 novel by American novelist Robert Stone
- John Outterbridge, American artist and community activist
