= Edward S. Harkness House =

House in Manhattan, New York

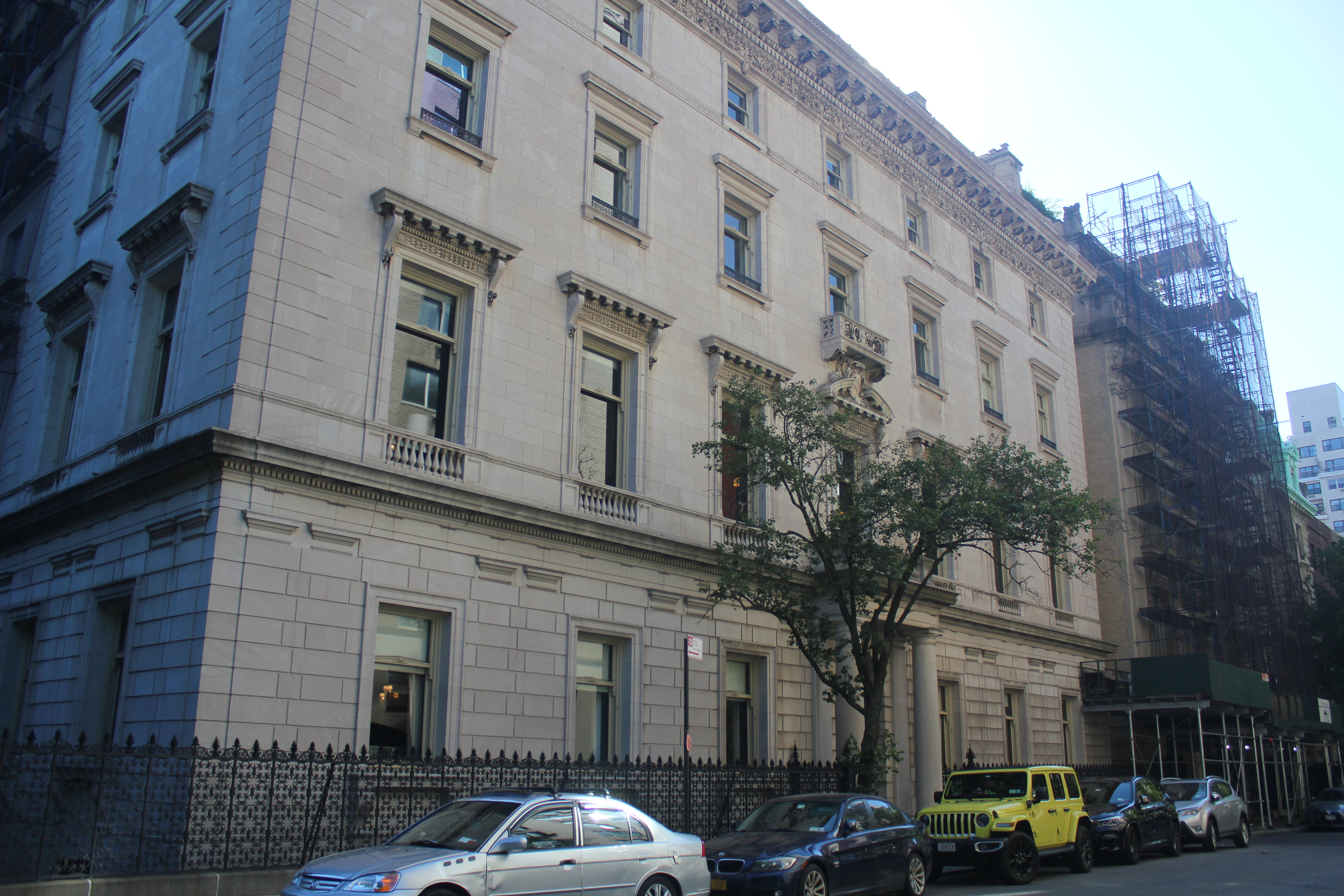
- The main elevation of the facade on 75th Street
- Interactive map of the Edward S. Harkness House area

General information
- Type: Mansion
- Architectural style: Modern Renaissance
- Location: 1 East 75th Street, Manhattan, New York 10021, United States
- Coordinates: 40°46′28″N 73°57′55″W
- Current tenants: Commonwealth Fund
- Construction started: 1907
- Completed: 1909
- Cost: $550,000
- Client: Edward Harkness
- Owner: Commonwealth Fund

Technical details
- Floor count: 5

Design and construction
- Architect: James Gamble Rogers

New York City Landmark
- Designated: January 24, 1967
- Reference no.: 0415

The Edward S. Harkness House (also 1 East 75th Street and the Harkness Mansion) is a Modern Renaissance–style mansion at the northeastern corner of Fifth Avenue and 75th Street on the Upper East Side of Manhattan in New York City, New York, United States. Built between 1907 and 1909, it was designed by James Gamble Rogers for the philanthropist and oil heir Edward Harkness and his wife Mary Harkness. The mansion, which has been the Commonwealth Fund's headquarters since 1952, is a New York City designated landmark.

The Harkness House is five stories tall and has a facade made of Tennessee marble, with few exterior decorations. Because the mansion has a longer frontage along 75th Street than on Fifth Avenue, the main entrance is through a portico on 75th Street. The rest of the facade has windows with carved sills and lintels. The house retains most of its original interiors, which were designed in a much more elaborate manner than the facade, though these spaces have been converted to offices. The ground floor contained a reception room and dining room, and the second floor had a salon, music room, and library. There were also servants' rooms in the basement and attic, as well as bedrooms for the Harkness family on the third and fourth floors.

Edward Harkness acquired the site at the northeast corner of 75th Street and Fifth Avenue in January 1907. When the house was completed, it was one of seven residences that the Harkness family owned. Edward lived there until his death in 1940. When Mary died ten years later, she bequeathed the house to the Commonwealth Fund, an organization founded by Edward's mother. After the Commonwealth Fund converted the house into offices, the organization used the building as its headquarters. By the late 20th century, the Harkness House was one of a relatively small number of pre–World War I mansions remaining in the area. Commentary of the house's design has been largely positive, focusing on the simplicity of the facade.

== Site ==
The Edward S. Harkness House is on the northeastern corner of 75th Street and Fifth Avenue, on the Upper East Side of Manhattan in New York City, New York, United States. The house has a primary address of 1 East 75th Street, with an alternate address of 940 Fifth Avenue. The house occupies a rectangular land lot of 4,025 square feet (373.9 m^{2}), with a frontage of 35 feet (11 m) on Fifth Avenue to the west and 115 feet (35 m) on 75th Street to the south. Immediately to the south are the apartment building at 930 Fifth Avenue and the Nathaniel L. McCready House at 4 East 75th Street. The Conservatory Water pond at Central Park is directly to the west, across Fifth Avenue, while the Clarence Whitman Mansion is at 7 East 76th Street on the block to the north.

At the time of the Harkness House's construction, it was one of several Renaissance–style mansions in New York City to be built upon a highly visible corner site. The house originally shared the block with Temple Beth-El, a synagogue directly to the north. It was one of several mansions on the block of 75th Street between Fifth and Madison avenues that replaced smaller row houses; the block's residents during the early 20th century included the magnates Edwin Gould and Barron Collier. By the late 20th century, the Harkness House was one of a relatively small number of remaining pre–World War I mansions in the southern portion of the Upper East Side; most of the surrounding mansions were replaced with apartment buildings after the war. Other surviving pre-war mansions nearby include the Henry Clay Frick House, Oliver Gould Jennings House, Henry T. Sloane House, Gertrude Rhinelander Waldo House, and Joseph Pulitzer House.

== Architecture ==
The building was designed by the firm of Hale and Rogers for the philanthropist and oil heir Edward Harkness and his wife Mary Harkness. James Gamble Rogers was the house's primary architect. After he designed the Harkness House, Rogers was hired to design several other structures for the Harkness family, such as Yale University's Memorial Quadrangle, Columbia University's Butler Library, and the Columbia-Presbyterian Medical Center.

The architectural writer Robert A. M. Stern describes the structure as an early Modern Renaissance–style building in New York City. The building has Italian Renaissance–style architectural elements as well. The house has a frontage of 104 feet (32 m) on 75th Street, while the Fifth Avenue frontage measures 35 feet (11 m) wide. The structure is five stories high, but the attic (which originally contained servants' quarters) is concealed from street level.

=== Facade ===
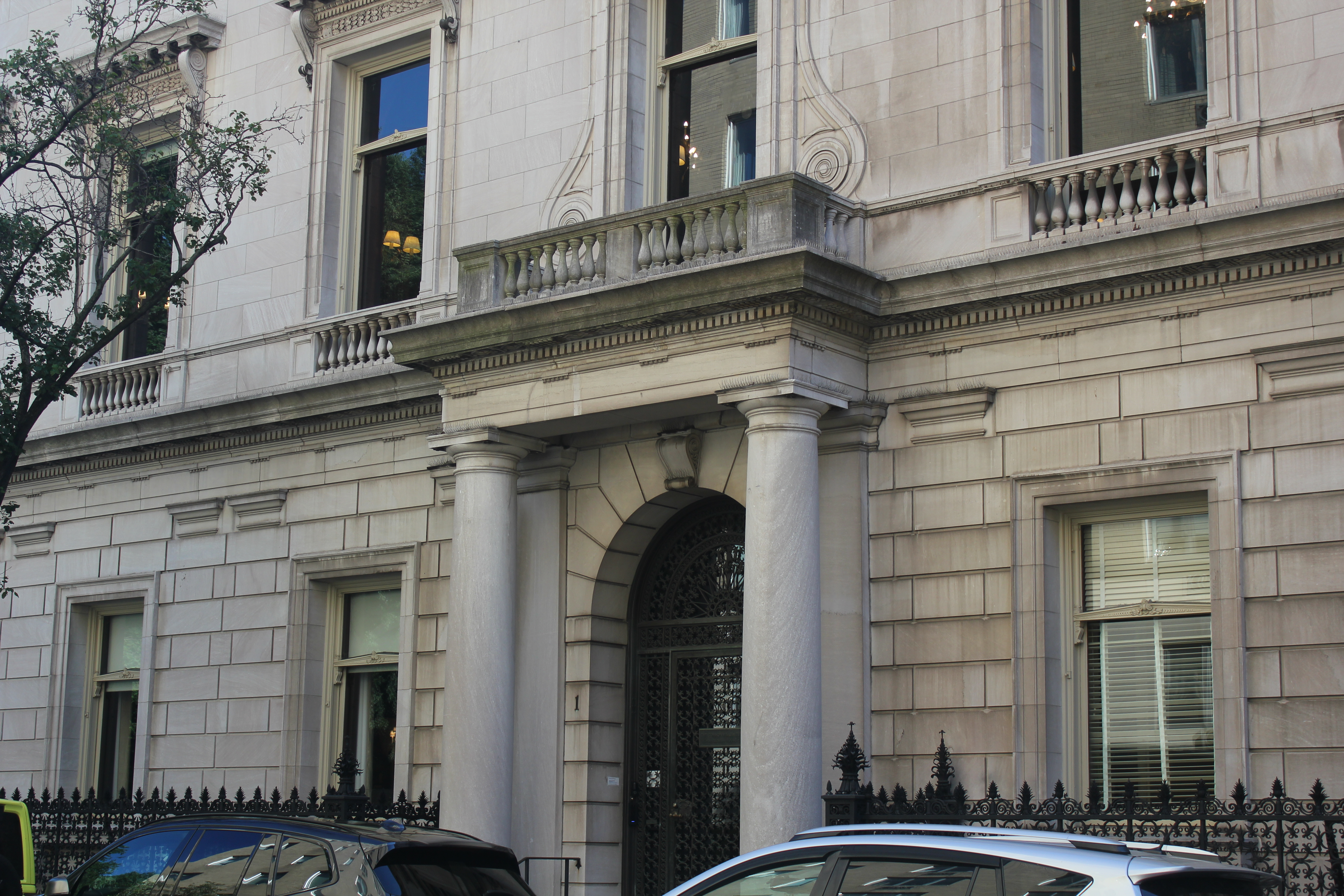
The ground-level facade on 75th Street

The Harkness House is five stories high and has relatively little architectural ornamentation compared with other mansions nearby. Harkness had wanted a "dignified house that would not in an ostentatious way indicate its costliness". Early plans called for the first story to be made of granite, while the upper stories would have been made of marble with terracotta trim. As built, the entire facade is clad in Tennessee marble, with trim made of granite and terracotta. The wider 75th Street elevation of the facade (which faces south) is divided vertically into seven bays, while the narrower Fifth Avenue elevation (which faces west) is divided into two bays. The design of the facade on 75th Street is continued along Fifth Avenue. Two leaded windows are installed on the eastern elevation, and an alleyway measuring 12 feet (3.7 m) wide was built to the east of the house as well.

An areaway separates the house from the sidewalk, and there is an iron fence in front of the areaway, inspired by a similar fence in the Italian city of Verona. Due to the narrow frontage on Fifth Avenue, the main entrance is through an archway at the center of the 75th Street elevation. There is a portico, supported by a pair of Tuscan columns, in front of the archway. The rest of the first story contains windows, which have raised window sills to prevent pedestrians from looking in. The first story is clad with rusticated marble blocks, with deep grooves running horizontally and vertically across the facade. The vertical grooves between the first-story windows are arranged in a pattern to give the illusion of vertical pilasters on the facade. Above the first story, there are two capitals between each bay, further contributing to the impression of pilasters. Unlike traditional pilasters, the grooved sections of the wall do not have vertical decorative elements that evoke column shafts.

The second through fourth stories have a smooth ashlar facade with quoins at each corner. The second-story windows, which illuminate the reception rooms inside, are taller than those on the upper stories. There are balustrades at the bottom of each second-story window, as well as console brackets with cornices above each window. In addition, the central second-story window on 75th Street has a small balcony directly above the entrance, and there are scrolls beside the window and a broken pediment above. The third-story windows are plain in design; these windows have sills supported by corbel blocks, as well as plain cornices above. The central third-story window on 75th Street has a balcony with tracery on its balustrade. The fourth-story windows are square, and the window sills are connected by a decorative frieze. The lintels above the fourth-story windows are connected by a frieze with foliate patterns in high relief. A cornice with dentils runs horizontally above the fourth floor. The attic level is concealed by the cornice and by a balustrade running above the fourth floor.

=== Features ===
According to the New York City Department of City Planning, the Harkness House has a gross floor area of 17,880 square feet (1,661 m^{2}). The building has five above-ground levels and two basements, with a steel frame that was built using the post and lintel system. In contrast to the facade, the interior was designed in a very elaborate style, using the highest-quality materials available at the time. The western and southeastern parts of the house were originally used as living quarters, while the northern part had service rooms. In designing the house, Rogers used a compact floor plan to give it a domestic ambiance. Harkness had specified that the house should contain at least 14 bedrooms for servants and 7 bedrooms for family members, as well as other mechanical and service rooms such as kitchens. There were originally marble and wrought iron decorations, in addition to a passenger elevator and a service elevator. Many of the original interior decorations remain intact, but the interiors have been converted to offices.

==== First floor ====
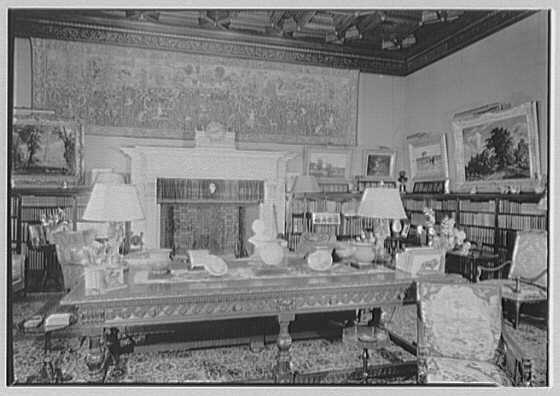
Interior of the house

The first floor has dining and reception rooms. The entrance on 75th Street leads to a plain vestibule with a ceiling vault, which was originally made of glass but was replaced with limestone after the 1920s. To the left of the vestibule is a square entrance hall, separated from the vestibule by a glass-and-bronze door. The entrance hall has a marble floor, Botticino limestone walls, and a leaded-glass ceiling dome, along with plaster reliefs. It was originally furnished with Italian chairs and tables. A Town and Country magazine article described the entrance hall as combining the more formal elements of the vestibule with the less formal design of the living quarters inside. There is a stair hall next to the entrance hall, which is not visible from the vestibule. The house's stair hall has marble newel posts designed by Henry Hering. The stair itself has brass railings, and the walls and steps of the staircase are made of marble. There is a leaded-glass dome above the stair hall on the second floor.

West of the entrance hall, on the western end of the first floor, is the reception room, which faces Central Park. The reception room has a ceiling mural and was originally decorated in a French style, specifically the Louis XVI style. The ceiling mural contains representations of various figures such as white women carrying umbrellas, along with monkeys and Chinese men. The fixtures, such as light switches, were designed so they blended in with the woodwork. There is a small fireplace in the reception room, which is flanked by wall sconces. The reception room also had a Persian-style leather screen. There was originally a pair of doors connecting the entrance hall to the reception room; when the Commonwealth Fund took over the building in 1952, the reception room became a conference space, and the door was removed. North of the entrance hall, another room connects with the dressing room and elevator. The dressing room has mirrors and a coved ceiling.

The eastern half of the ground floor is occupied by the dining room and butler's pantry, the former of which is raised slightly above the entrance hall. East of the entrance hall are two doorways, one of which has a small staircase to the dining room. The dining room has Caen stone walls, as well as a ceiling with deep beams and velvet draperies on the walls. When the building was used as a residence, the dining room had sconces and chandeliers inspired by old Italian designs. There were also carved furniture, walnut chairs, and a sideboard from Italy, in addition to an Oriental rug. Kenyon Cox designed the leaded-glass windows on the eastern wall of the dining room; the windows were meant to conceal the fact that the house to the east had a plain brick wall. According to Cox, the leaded-glass windows were inspired by Italian Renaissance book decorations. The dining room was converted to the Commonwealth Fund's boardroom after the organization took over the building.

==== Second floor ====
The second floor has three rooms: a music room, a salon, and a library. The stair hall connects with a gallery that extends west to east across the second floor; a double door separates the stair hall and the gallery. The central gallery has wood paneling, hanging tapestries, and a domed ceiling. Along the gallery's side walls are pilasters with carved Corinthian capitals, which separate the walls into five bays. The ceiling is painted tan and is decorated with colorful figures such as griffins, people with wings, and putti. The space originally had a fountain in one corner, which is made of Carrara marble and includes a bronze sculpture. When the Commonwealth Fund took over the building, the gallery became an office for assistants to the fund's president and vice president. Another stairway leads from the gallery to a mezzanine with storage rooms, as well as the third floor.

The music room, on the eastern side of the house, is illuminated by leaded windows and has pilasters on the walls, an ornate cornice, and a coffered ceiling. As originally designed, the music room had two imported Italian chandeliers; by the 21st century, there were four chandeliers. The music room originally also had tapestries, brocades, and Italian-style wall coverings. There was an ornate fireplace mantel, which was originally topped by either an ornate panel or a tapestry. Most of the original decorations have been removed, but the ceiling remains intact. In the 21st century, the music room functions as an office for Commonwealth Fund staff.

To the west is the library, which has a wooden coffered ceiling with Italian-style gold-leaf arabesques. The ceiling is made of Brazilian rosewood and is divided into a grid of octagons and gaps. Light bulb sockets were placed within the wooden beams, but they were later removed because they were hard to maintain. The library also has a large fireplace mantel made of stone.

==== Other floors ====
The upper stories were originally used as bedrooms and had carved doorways, sculpted ceilings, and decorative wall panels. There were seven bedrooms in total. On the third floor were some bathrooms, a maid's bedroom, a valet's bedroom, a dressing room, safes, a boudoir for Mary Harkness, and a chamber for Edward Harkness. The boudoir, facing Fifth Avenue, has rounded corners and a fireplace and is used by the Commonwealth Fund's vice president and treasurer. There were five more chambers on the fourth floor, as well as a sewing room and servants' quarters.

In contrast to similar houses that had laundry rooms in the basement, the Harkness House's laundry room was located in the attic. The laundry room was finished with rubber floors and ceramic-tile walls, and it had a gas stove and a washing machine. In the basement, there was a refrigeration room, which faced the areaway in front of the house. The refrigerators in that room were configured so that their doors could be opened to let in cold air whenever the areaway was cold enough. The basement also originally had a wine cellar, refrigerator, and more bedrooms. Beneath it is a sub-basement, which originally had storage space and boilers. All of the floors are connected by a stairway that was originally used by servants.

== History ==
=== Development ===
The Edward S. Harkness House was originally constructed for Edward Harkness, a philanthropist whose father Stephen had earned his fortune as a director of Standard Oil. Edward Harkness inherited a substantial fortune from his family members, including his father. He donated tens of millions of dollars to various causes over the years—including to Harvard University, Yale University, Columbia University, and the Metropolitan Museum of Art—though he kept a relatively low profile. After Edward married Mary Stillman Harkness in 1904, the couple lived at 16 East 79th Street four blocks north. Harkness's mother Anna M. Harkness decided to give the newlyweds land for the house. In January 1907, the Harkness family acquired a land lot at the northeast corner of 75th Street and Fifth Avenue, measuring 35 by 115 feet (11 by 35 m), from John R. Ford. The house was one of several large residences being constructed on Fifth Avenue at the time, along with structures like the William Starr Miller House and William A. Clark House.

Harkness hired James Gamble Rogers's firm to design a house on that site in February 1907. The two men knew each other; Harkness had been a trustee at Yale University, whose campus Rogers had designed, and Rogers and Harkness had been classmates. The plans were tentatively estimated to cost $500,000 (equivalent to $17,277,000 in 2025). The architects submitted plans for a five-story mansion to the New York City Department of Buildings that June, at which point the building was to cost $250,000 (equivalent to $8,638,000 in 2025). George B. Wilson was hired as the building's general contractor. While the new house was under construction, the Harkness family lived at their 79th Street house and their summer home in New London, Connecticut.

Work progressed rapidly through mid-1908. The address 1 East 75th Street originally belonged to Stuart Duncan's residence directly to the east, but when Harkness requested the address number, Duncan's address was changed to 3 East 75th Street. At the time, such address renumberings were commonplace on the Upper East Side, where house numbers "1" and "2" on east–west streets (facing Fifth Avenue) were considered more prestigious than house numbers on Fifth Avenue itself. The house was completed in 1909 at a cost of $550,000.

=== Usage ===
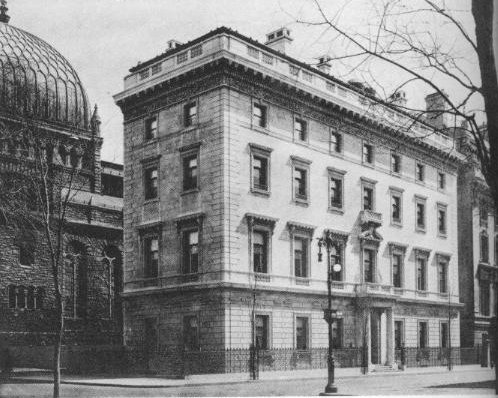
Edward S. Harkness House in 1908

The family generally shunned public functions. In the house's first few decades, it hosted some events, such as a debutante ball for a member of the Stillman family, a dance for the Harknesses' nephew Henry C. Taylor, a meeting for the Dutch consul general in New York City, and a lecture by the pianist Margaret Deneke. By the late 1910s, Edward Harkness's real estate holdings, including the 75th Street house, were estimated at $1,090,000 (equivalent to $20,241,000 in 2025). The music room was refurbished in 1920, but the reason for this has not been publicly disclosed. The house's basement was flooded in 1924 after a water main broke. By the late 1920s, many of Fifth Avenue's mansions were being demolished to make way for apartments, although the Harkness House remained standing.

The 75th Street mansion was one of seven Harkness family residences. In addition to the 75th Street mansion, the Harknesses had a carriage house nearby on 73rd Street. The family stayed at their Eolia estate in Connecticut from June to September, and they also vacationed in England during the summers. Edward Harkness continued to live at the house until he died there on January 29, 1940; his funeral was hosted there shortly afterward. Edward bequeathed the house and most of its furnishings to his wife, except for the books, art, and manuscripts, which were to be given away to the New York Public Library and Metropolitan Museum of Art after Mary's death. Mary Harkness continued to live in the mansion until her own death in June 1950. When Mary died, the house's paintings were valued at $325,000, while its collection of books and autographs was worth $33,000. The building itself was valued at $275,000.

The Harkness family had no children, so Mary Harkness bequeathed the building and $250,000 to the Commonwealth Fund, a charity that Anna Harkness had founded in 1918. The Commonwealth Fund formally obtained the house from Mary Harkness's estate in July 1951, and the organization renovated the building for use as its headquarters. The fund moved into the house in 1952, and the organization continued to use the house through the 20th century. The New York City Landmarks Preservation Commission designated the building as an official city landmark in 1967, and the New York City Board of Estimate approved the designation that March. The Commonwealth Fund was exempt from paying property taxes on the building, but it voluntarily made payments in lieu of taxes in the city. The Harkness House's facade was restored in the early 2000s, at which point the Commonwealth Fund still occupied the building.

== Reception ==
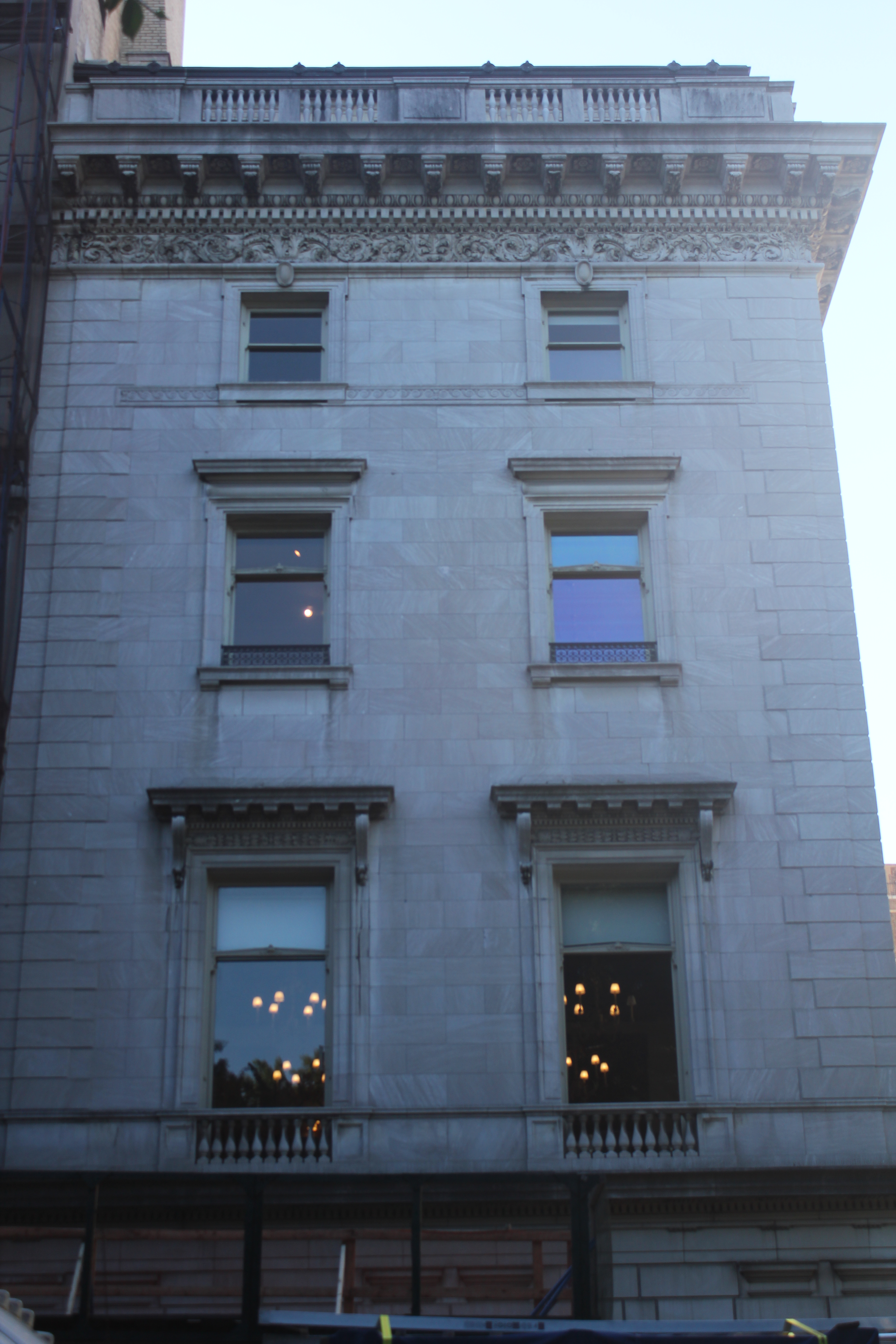
The facade as seen from Fifth Avenue

When the building was completed, Brooklyn Life described the building as a marble structure "in the chaste style of architecture that best becomes that beautiful material". In a 1912 article about the mansion, Town and Country magazine similarly described the house as having a modest design in spite of the expensive materials. A writer for The New York Architect said the house included all the standard features of an upscale urban dwelling, albeit in a way that was "entirely free from exaggeration", a sentiment echoed by the Architectural Record. According to the Record, the sparing use of ornamentation gave the facade an air of "quiet elegance", as contrasted with the interiors, which were clad with "the best [materials] which it was possible to buy". A writer for Vogue magazine, in 1915, credited the plain exterior with giving the mansion "the air of reserve with which it should face the world".

In a 1979 article comparing the Harkness House with the James B. Duke House at 1 East 78th Street, Paul Goldberger wrote for The New York Times that the Harkness House's small scale made it feel inviting, even though the Harkness and Duke houses were similar in size. The writer John Tauranac cites the architect Donn Barber as saying that the mansion was a "dignified house that would not in an ostentatious way indicate its costliness".

== See also ==
- List of New York City Designated Landmarks in Manhattan from 59th to 110th Streets
