= Commonwealth Fund =

American foundation

The Commonwealth Fund
- Founded: 1918; 108 years ago
- Founder: Anna Harkness
- Location: New York City, U.S.
- Key people: Joseph R. Betancourt, President
- Endowment: $700 million
- Website: www.commonwealthfund.org

The Commonwealth Fund is an American private foundation whose stated purpose is to "promote a high-performing health care system that achieves better access, improved quality, and greater efficiency, particularly for society's most vulnerable, including low-income people, the uninsured, and people of color." It is active in a number of areas related to health care and health policy. It is led by Joseph R. Betancourt, M.D., M.P.H.

== Healthcare rankings ==
Since 2004 it has produced reports comparing healthcare systems in high income countries using survey and administrative data from the OECD and the World Health Organization which is analyzed under five themes: access to care, the care process, administrative efficiency, equity and health-care outcomes. The United States has been assessed as worst health-care system overall among 11 high-income countries in every report, even though it spends the highest proportion of its gross domestic product on health care. In 2021 Norway, the Netherlands and Australia were the top-performing countries.

== History ==
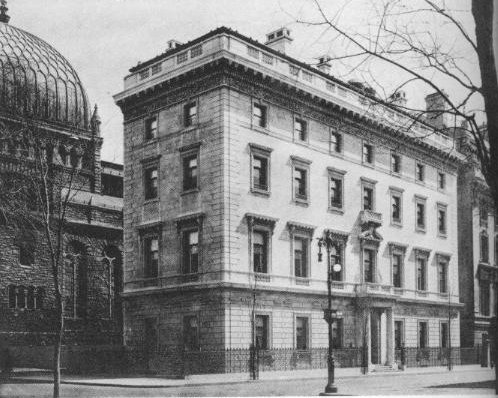
Harkness House in 1908

The Edward S. Harkness Eye Institute at NewYork-Presbyterian

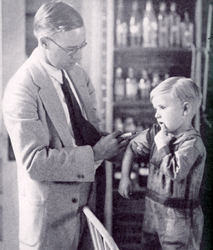
A child receiving rabies inoculation

The Commonwealth Fund, one of the first foundations to be established by a woman, was founded in 1918 with an endowment of almost $10 million by Anna M. Harkness. The widow of Stephen V. Harkness, a principal investor in Standard Oil, Harkness wanted to "do something for the welfare of mankind." Harkness's son, Edward Stephen Harkness, became the Commonwealth Fund's first president and hired a staff of people to help him build the foundation. Edward and his wife Mary Harkness possessed a "passionate commitment to social reform" and were "determined to improve health and health services for Americans." Through additional gifts and bequests between 1918 and 1959, the Harkness family's total contribution to the fund's endowment amounted to more than $53 million. By the end of 2021 the Commonwealth Fund's endowment stood at almost $840 million.

According to the Rockefeller Archive Center, the Commonwealth Fund's "early grants supported a variety of programs while generally promoting welfare, especially child welfare." Over the years, it has given support to medical schools and to the building of hospitals and clinics. In New York City, the Commonwealth Fund and Edward Harkness largely orchestrated the merger of Columbia Medical School and Presbyterian Hospital. The merger culminated in the establishment of the world's first academic medical center the then-called Columbia-Presbyterian Medical Center in 1922. The Hospital continues to operate today as NewYork-Presbyterian / Columbia University Irving Medical Center which contains the Harkness Pavilion and the Edward S. Harkness Eye Institute

In the mid-1920s, the chief interest of the foundation had become public health, including mental hygiene, community health, rural hospitals, medical research, and medical education. Other grant areas included war relief, educational and legal research, and international medical fellowships.

In 1925, the Commonwealth Fund launched its international program of fellowships called the Commonwealth Fund Fellowships (now the Harkness Fellowships). Until the 1990s, the fellowship was open to scholars of all academic disciplines, and included many who went on to excel in science, the arts and business.

From the late 1920s through the 1940s, the Commonwealth Fund supported the construction of rural hospitals, paving the way for the Hill-Burton Act in 1946. Following World War II, the foundation supported the development of new medical schools in the United States in an effort to address doctor shortages and meet the needs of communities lacking health care services. Other achievements include the Rochester Regional Hospital Council and the development of the Nurse Practitioner and Physician Assistant professions.

In the 1940s, the fund supported research by Dr. Georgios Papanikolaou that pioneered the Pap test as the basic technique for detecting cervical cancer. Refinement of cardiac catheterization into routine treatment resulted in a 1956 Nobel Prize for the Fund-supported researchers.

In the 1960s and early 1970s, the organization focused on developing urban health care systems, and in the late 1970s, worked to improve medical school curricula. In the 1980s, the Commonwealth Fund played a prominent role in the development of the patient-centered care movement and helped draw attention to the needs of older Americans.

While the Commonwealth Fund does not typically accept donations, several gifts to the foundation have increased the endowment and expanded the scope of the Commonwealth Fund's projects and programs:

- In 1986, Jean and Harvey Picker merged $15 million in assets of the James Picker Foundation with those of the Commonwealth Fund.
- In 1996, the Commonwealth Fund received $1.7 million from the Health Services Improvement Fund with a mandate to use the funds to improve health care coverage, access, and quality in the New York City greater metropolitan region.
- In 1999, Floriana Hogan left $100,000 to the fund, and Frances Cooke Macgregor contributed $3.1 million to the endowment in 2002.

Notable early grantees and years funded
- American Board of Pediatrics, 1972–1975
- American Red Cross (Emergency Relief) 1919–1920, 1922, 1928 1937, 1955, 1960
- American Museum of Natural History, 1969–1970, 1979–1983
- Boy Scouts of America, 1919, 1921, 1928
- Brigham and Women's Hospital, 1974–1987
- Columbia University, 1920–1982, 1979–1991
- Food Packages for Austria, 1946–1950
- Food Packages for England, 1947–1948
- Guttmacher Institute, 1977–1983
- Harkness Community and Medical Center, 1967–1975
- Harvard University, 1920–1987
- International Women's Health Coalition, 1984–1986
- Johns Hopkins University, 1919–1984, 1977–1981
- Juilliard School, 1972–1981
- Lincoln Center for the Performing Arts, 1957–1966
- Museum of the City of New York, 1971–1974
- New York Botanical Garden, 1946–1958, 1968–1969, 1975–1980
- Planned Parenthood of New York City, Inc., 1967–1980, 1982–1986
- Royal Society of Medicine, 1969–1981
- University of Saint Andrews, 1960–1961
- The Urban Institute, 1981–1986
- Vanderbilt University School of Medicine, 1981–1988
- War Relief and Related Purposes, 1939–1949
- Yale University, 1921–1982
