= This Is America (book) =

1942 book by Eleanor Roosevelt

- Author: Eleanor Roosevelt
- Illustrator: Frances Cooke Macgregor
- Publication date: 1942

This Is America is a 1942 book with text by First Lady Eleanor Roosevelt and photographs by Frances Cooke Macgregor published by G. P. Putnam's and Sons, New York. The title This Is America coincided with the 1942 series of wartime posters by the Sheldon-Claire company of Chicago, "This is America... Keep it Free".
