= Homasote =

Cellulose-based fiber wall board

Homasote Company
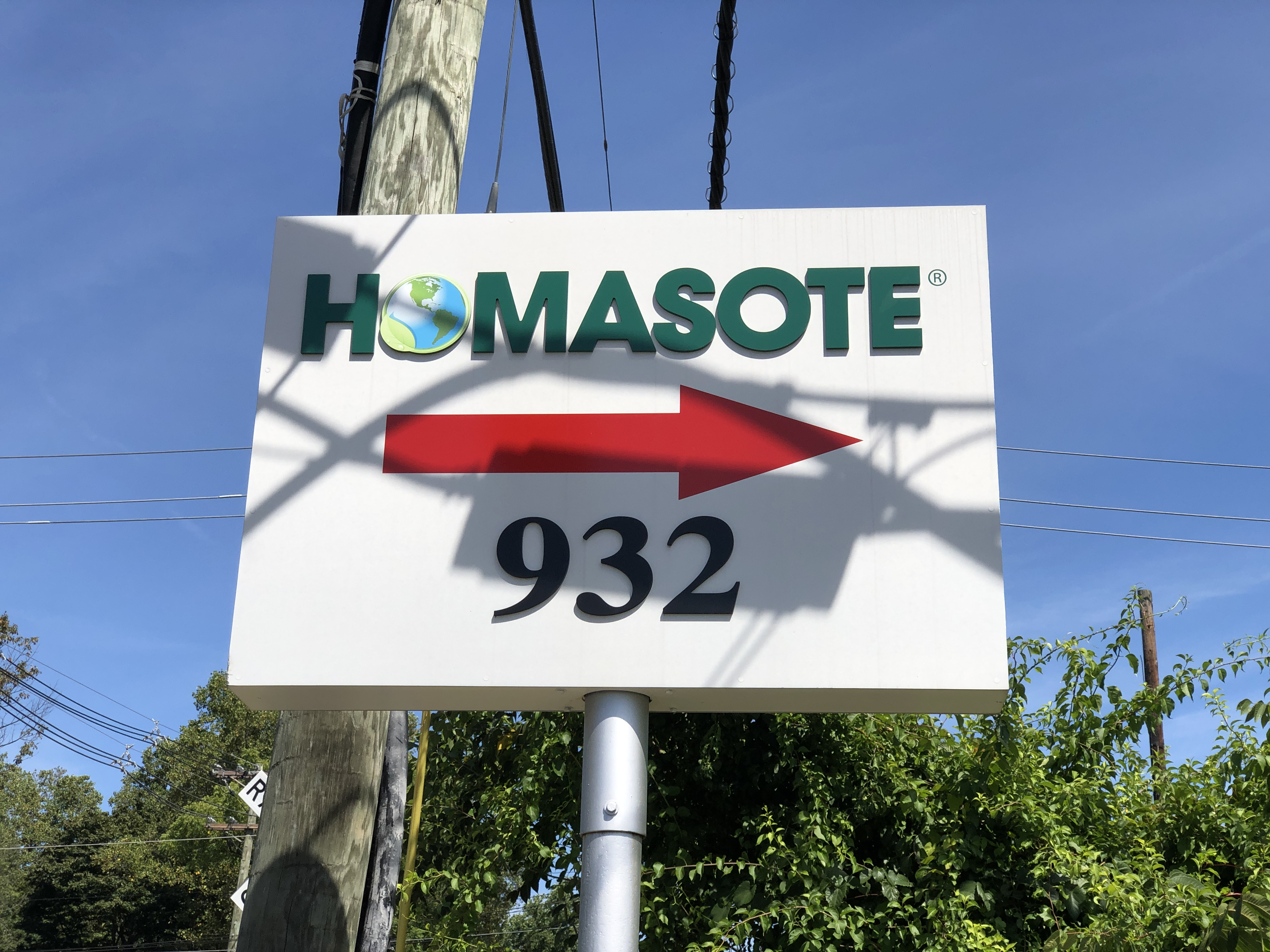
- Sign for Homasote
- Formerly: Agasote Millboard Company
- Type: Public
- Traded as: HMTC (OTC)
- Industry: Building products
- Founded: 1909; 117 years ago
- Founder: Eugenius Harvey Outerbridge
- Headquarters: West Trenton, New Jersey,
- Key people: Warren L. Flicker, CEO
- Products: Cellulose-based fiber wall board
- Revenue: $19 million (2021)
- Website: homasote.com
- Footnotes; 2021 Annual Report

Homasote is a brand name associated with the product generically known as cellulose-based fiber wall board, which is similar in composition to papier-mâché, made from recycled paper that is compressed under high temperature and pressure. Homasote contains no adhesives. It is held together by the surface tension between the paper fibers, a process that is augmented by hydrogen bonding and the presence of a wax binder (2% volume). It is available in multiple thicknesses and comes in sheets 4 by 8 feet (1.2 by 2.4 m). The Homasote Company operates a 750,000-square-foot (70,000 m^{2}) factory in the West Trenton section of Ewing Township, New Jersey.

== History ==
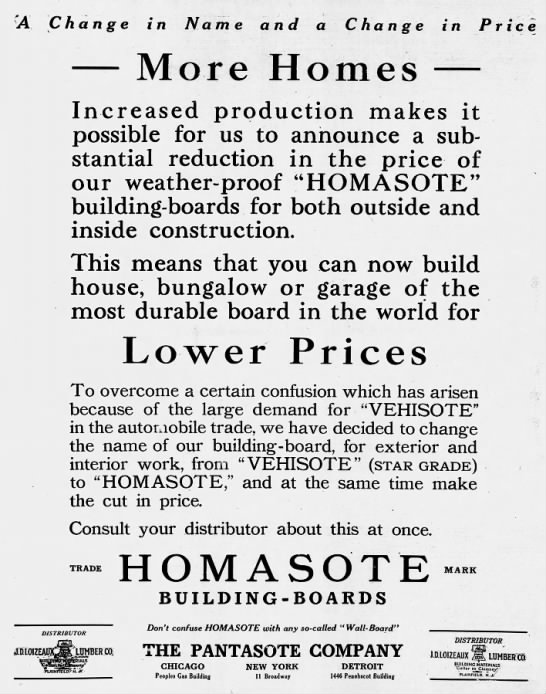
A notice from June 1922 about Vehisote being renamed as Homasote

The Agasote Millboard Company was founded as a division of the Bermuda Trading Company in 1909 by Eugenius Harvey Outerbridge. Outerbridge brought the process to the United States from England.

The first commercial use of the panels were for lining railroad cars. In 1915, the company won a contract to use the panels as automobile tops. From 1915 to 1925, they supplied board for the tops of Ford Motor Company, Buick, Nash Motors, Studebaker, and Dodge. They also manufactured a larger panel, sold as "Vehisote" for truck panels. The panels were used for the exterior of field hospitals and military housing in France during World War I. By 1925, car manufacturers switched to canvas tops and Agasote lost sales, so the company heavily promoted Homasote for its versatility and insulation properties. The company then changed its name to Homasote after its now-largest product.

Contemporarily, the company produces several variants of the product, including 440 SoundBarrier, Firestall Roof Deck, and Ice Deck.

== Uses ==
Homasote was widely used as wall sheeting from the 1940s into the 1970s. Due to the development of more fire-resistant gypsum board, it has decreased in popularity as a wall sheeting.

Homasote is found in studio spaces and featured in many art institutions as a wall covering and doubling as a type of cork board. It often receives hundreds of coats of paint over the years due to the product's strength.

Homasote is frequently used by model railroading for the sub-roadbed or roadbed, because of its noise-deadening qualities, ease of forming into shapes used as roadbed for tracks, ease of driving nails to hold track sections to the bed, light weight and retention of form under plaster scenery. Cork, plywood, hardboard, drywall, and foam insulation are common alternatives to Homasote.

Homasote is used for blocking knit or crochet pieces. "Homosote (sic) is sturdy, and incredibly absorbent. It will wick water away from your garment so it dries more quickly. And it's like a bulletin board—you can stick pins in it easily."

At Northwest Folklife, the dance floor in the Fisher Pavilion is built each year from two layers of Homasote overlaid with a layer of painted Masonite. The Homasote base reduces the incidence of impact injuries such as shin splints caused by dancing on the concrete floor.

Homasote is used in theatrical sets as a noise deadening layer for stage platforms consisting of a 3/4-inch (19 mm) plywood sublayer, a 1/2-inch (13 mm) Homasote layer, and a 1/4-inch (6 mm) Masonite top layer.
