= Mary Stillman Harkness =

American philanthropist (1874–1950)

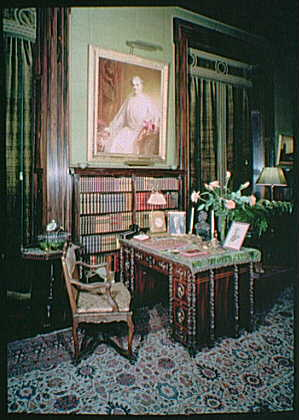
- Portrait of Mrs. Edward Harkness by Frank O. Salisbury, in Harkness House
- Born: Mary Emma Stillman; July 4, 1874; Brooklyn, New York
- Died: June 6, 1950 (aged 75); New York City
- Other name: Mrs. Edward S. Harkness
- Known for: philanthropy
- Spouse: Edward Harkness
- Children: none
- Parents: Thomas Edgar Stillman (father); Elizabeth Greenman Stillman (mother)

Mary Emma Stillman Harkness (July 4, 1874 – June 6, 1950) was an American philanthropist. The wife of Edward Harkness, she participated in his philanthropy and also gave independently to various institutions, particularly for women's education, continuing to do so after his death in 1940.

== Early life and marriage ==
Harkness was born in the then–independent city of Brooklyn, New York, the third of four daughters of Thomas Edgar Stillman, a wealthy New York lawyer. Her mother, Elizabeth, was the only surviving child of Thomas Stillman Greenman, a shipbuilder in Mystic, Connecticut. In 1904, she married Edward Harkness, the wealthy heir of an early investor in Standard Oil.

== Philanthropy ==
The couple did not have children. Edward had begun philanthropic work before their marriage, which the couple continued both together and separately. After his death in 1940, she spent the rest of her life making donations to various institutions. She died in 1950, leaving an $18 million estate, including public bequests of more than $4 million.

Women's education was a focus of her giving. She supported the founding of Connecticut College as a women's college in 1911, after Wesleyan University decided it would admit only men, and in the 1930s gave the college a total of almost $540,000, including a dormitory, Harkness House, and the chapel. She also donated in 1930 to the then women-only Lady Margaret Hall, Oxford; her gift, made through the auspices of the musician Margaret Deneke when she was touring the United States, was used to build the Deneke Building, designed by Giles Gilbert Scott and completed in 1932.

In 1907, the Harknesses bought the estate of Eolia, on Long Island Sound in Waterford, Connecticut, from Mary Harkness' sister Jessie and brother-in-law William Ambrose Taylor, for whom it was built; it was their primary summer home. In 1920, she created Camp Harkness, for children with polio, on part of the estate.

In 1929, Mary Harkness helped found the Marine Historical Association—now Mystic Seaport Museum—on land that had belonged to her shipbuilding grandfather; in 1945, she would donate his house to the museum as well.

She also funded two farms for research and treatment of rheumatic fever and donated funds to World War II relief in Europe and Asia. In 1941 she gave a farm in Nyack, New York to the Tolstoy Foundation for a resettlement center.

Harkness was a member of the American Museum of Natural History, the New York Botanical Garden, the Garden Club of America, the English-speaking Union, and the New York Philharmonic Society.

Harkness bequeathed the estate of Eolia to the State of Connecticut, where it is now Harkness Memorial State Park; the house is preserved as a memorial to her and her husband. Their mansion on the Upper East Side of Manhattan, Harkness House, is now the headquarters of the Commonwealth Fund, a Harkness foundation for healthcare philanthropy; after her husband's death, she succeeded him as its president in an honorary capacity. She is buried with her husband in a private mausoleum in Woodlawn Cemetery in The Bronx.
