= Edward Harkness =

American philanthropist

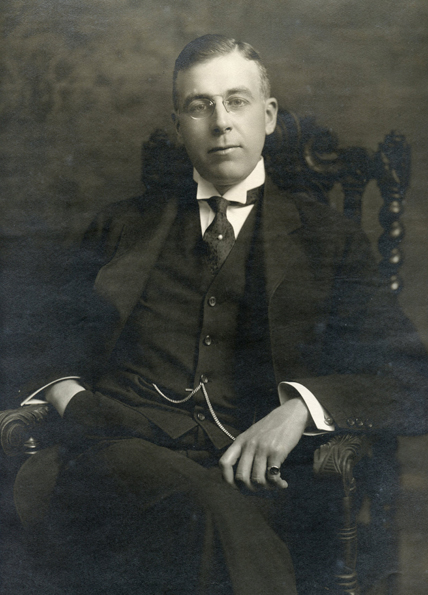
- Harkness circa 1912
- Born: Edward Stephen Harkness; January 22, 1874; Cleveland, Ohio, U.S.
- Died: January 29, 1940 (aged 66)
- Resting place: Woodlawn Cemetery
- Education: St. Paul's School; Yale College; Columbia Law School
- Political party: Republican
- Spouse: Mary Stillman
- Parent(s): Stephen V. Harkness; Anna M. Richardson (Harkness)
- Relatives: Charles W. Harkness, brother Florence, sister Lamon V. Harkness half brother

Edward Stephen Harkness (January 22, 1874 – January 29, 1940) was an American philanthropist. Given privately and through his family's Commonwealth Fund, Harkness' gifts to private hospitals, art museums, and educational institutions in the Northeastern United States were among the largest of the early twentieth century. He was a major benefactor to Columbia University, Yale University, Harvard University, Phillips Exeter Academy, St. Paul's School, the Metropolitan Museum of Art, and the University of St Andrews in Scotland. He was elected a member of the American Philosophical Society in 1934.

Harkness inherited his fortune from his father, Stephen V. Harkness – whose wealth was established by an early investment in Standard Oil – and from his brother, Charles W. Harkness. In 1918, he was ranked the 6th-richest person in the United States by Forbes magazine's first "Rich List", behind John D. Rockefeller, Henry Clay Frick, Andrew Carnegie, George Fisher Baker, and William Rockefeller.

== Biography ==
Edward ("Ned") Harkness was born in Cleveland, Ohio, one of four sons of Anna M. Harkness and Stephen V. Harkness, a harness-maker who invested in and was one of the five founding partners in the forerunner of Standard Oil, John D. Rockefeller's oil company. Stephen Harkness died when Edward was fourteen, leaving his wife and his oldest son, Charles, to manage the estate. Harkness attended St. Paul's School and Yale College, Class of 1897 and Columbia Law School. Harkness, his brother Charles, and cousin William were members of Wolf's Head Society at Yale. While at Yale, Ned enlisted the assistance of Henry Sloane Coffin as a tutor. Ned and Henry became friends and roomed together. Henry was later the pastor of Madison Avenue Presbyterian Church, a few blocks away from Harkness and his wife's mansion in New York. Henry's brother William Sloane Coffin Sr. was the president of the Metropolitan Museum of Art from 1931 to 1933. Ned had already been heavily involved with the museum as a trustee and major donor.

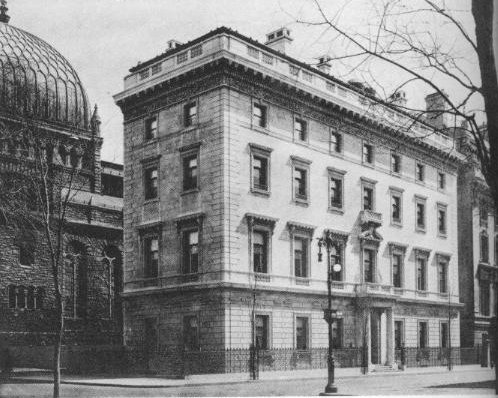
Harkness House in New York, now the home of the Commonwealth Fund

After graduating, Edward Harkness married Mary Stillman, daughter of wealthy New York attorney Thomas E. Stillman, in 1904. Her maternal grandfather, Thomas S. Greenman, was a shipbuilder in Mystic, Connecticut and the co-founder George Greenman & Co shipyard, now part of the Mystic Seaport Museum. Harkness' mother gave the couple a new Italian Renaissance mansion on Manhattan's Upper East Side as a wedding present. As the building's architect, Harkness chose Yale College classmate James Gamble Rogers, who would later design many of his philanthropic building projects. The home, at 75th Street and 5th Avenue and now known as the Edward S. Harkness House, became the headquarters of Harkness' Commonwealth Fund after Mary's death in 1950.

Harkness briefly served as a railroad director for the Southern Pacific Railroad, but within several years decided to become a full-time philanthropist. He began making gifts to the Egyptian collection at the Metropolitan Museum of Art in New York in 1912, and that same year was appointed to the museum's board of trustees.

Harkness' older brother Charles died in 1916 at age 55, leaving Edward more than US$80 million, $2.37 billion in 2025, much of it in Standard Oil stock. Charles had continued to invest substantially in Standard Oil as manager of the family fortune, and his brother's estate made Harkness the third-largest stakeholder in Standard Oil.

== Philanthropy ==
Harkness made charitable gifts totaling more than $129 million, the equivalent of $2.48 billion in 2025. His philanthropic peers John D. Rockefeller and Andrew Carnegie gave respectively $550 million and $350 million.

=== Medical philanthropy ===
Edward S. Harkness Eye Institute at NewYork-Presbyterian/Columbia

Harkness encouraged and orchestrated the merger of Presbyterian Hospital and Columbia University's College of Physicians and Surgeons, creating Columbia-Presbyterian Medical Center (CPMC), the world's first academic medical center.

CPMC was built in the 1920s on the site of Hilltop Park, the one-time home stadium of the New York Yankees, which Harkness purchased and donated. Despite his aversion to have anything named for himself, The Edward Harkness Eye Institute was named by relatives.

In 1997, Columbia-Presbyterian merged with the New York Hospital. New York Hospital had affiliated with Cornell University's Weill Cornell Medical College in the 1930s, following their lead. Now known as NewYork-Presbyterian Hospital / Columbia University Medical Center, the Harkness Pavilion, named for father Stephen, is a central part of the campus.

=== Arts philanthropy ===
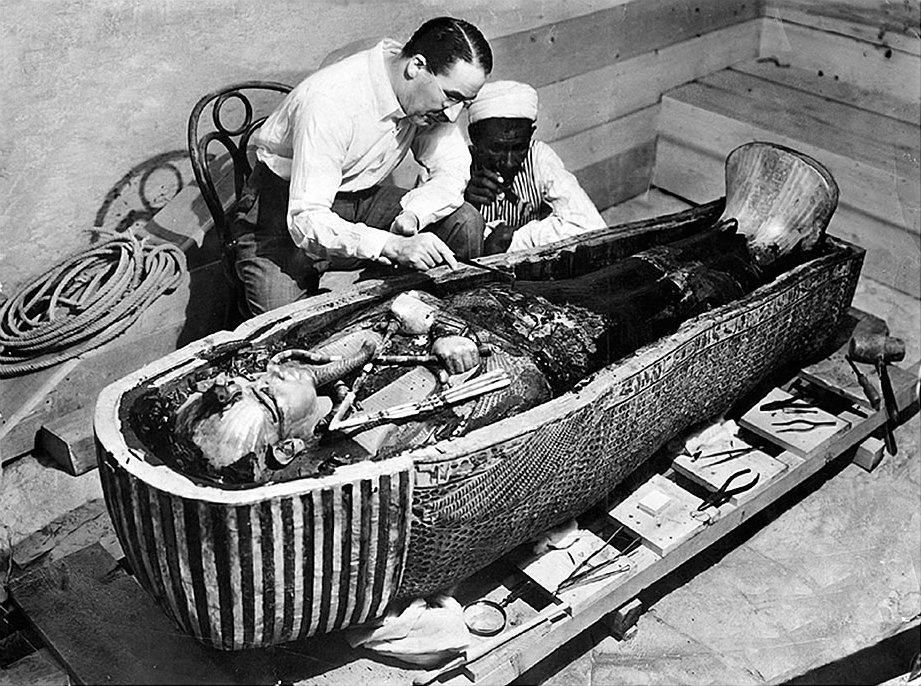
Howard Carter and the newly opened sarcophagus of Tutankhamun, 1924

Harkness was a major benefactor of the New York Public Library and the Metropolitan Museum of Art. In addition to donations to the Decorative Arts Department, he gifted the Metropolitan Museum its initial ancient Egyptian art collection. He purchased the complete Tomb of Perneb for the museum and helped purchase the Carnarvon Collection of Egyptian artifacts. He also donated the Met's unofficial mascot, a blue decorative hippo from the Egyptian Middle Kingdom's Twelfth Dynasty that is known as "William".

He was actively involved with the discovery and excavation of King Tutankhamun's tomb. The Harknesses and Albert Lythgoe visited Howard Carter at the site multiple times and Carter invited Harkness to witness the opening of King Tutankhamun's sarcophagus on February 12, 1924.

=== Educational philanthropy ===
In 1917, a year after Charles' death, Anna Harkness donated $3 million to Yale University to build the Memorial Quadrangle student dormitory in Charles' memory. In 1918, Anna Harkness established the Commonwealth Fund with an initial gift of $10 million, and Ned Harkness was made its president.

Ned Harkness and his wife made many contributions to educational buildings, including St Salvator's Hall at the University of St. Andrews; Harkness Chapel and Harkness Dormitory at Connecticut College; Butler Library at Columbia University as well as the original portions of the Columbia University Medical Center and the undergraduate dormitories at Brown University and Connecticut College—all of these were built through his philanthropy or that of his wife, Mary.

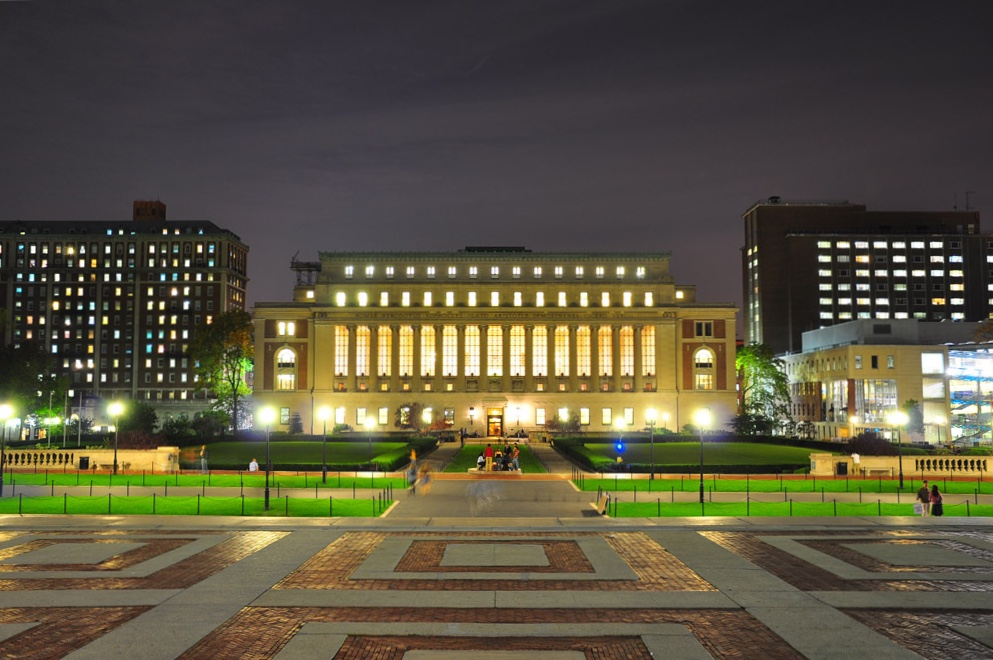
Butler Library at Columbia University

Between 1926 and 1930, Harkness made major donations to his alma mater, Yale, and Harvard to establish residential college systems at each school. Harkness admired the colleges of Oxford and Cambridge in England and proposed to Yale President James Rowland Angell that he would fund a similar system for Yale's undergraduate college to relieve overcrowding and improve social intimacy. When the Yale Corporation failed to accept Harkness' offer by 1928, he went to Harvard with a similar offer. Harvard's president, Abbott Lawrence Lowell, quickly accepted, and with a $10 million gift from Harkness in hand, eight houses for Harvard College were completed by 1931. Dismayed, Yale administrators appealed to Harkness to reconsider his offer. In 1930 he agreed to give Yale $11 million for nine residential colleges of its own. Harkness persuaded Yale to retain his friend James Gamble Rogers as the colleges' architect. He also made gifts that established the Yale School of Drama, the first independent drama faculty in the country, and erected its theater.

Around the same time as his Yale-Harvard philanthropy, Harkness sought to reform the pedagogical techniques of the country's elite boarding schools. At Phillips Exeter Academy, he sought to innovate beyond rote learning by introducing the Harkness table method of instruction. Through further gifts, the method spread to St. Paul's, The Lawrenceville School, and Kingswood-Oxford School. Harkness also made gifts to Taft School, The Hill School, and Phillips Academy.

He established the Harkness Fellowships and founded the Pilgrim Trust in the UK in 1930 with an endowment of just over two million pounds, "prompted by his admiration for what Great Britain had done in the 1914–18 war and, by his ties of affection for the land from which he drew his descent." The current priorities of the trust are preservation, places of worship, and social welfare.

== Residences ==
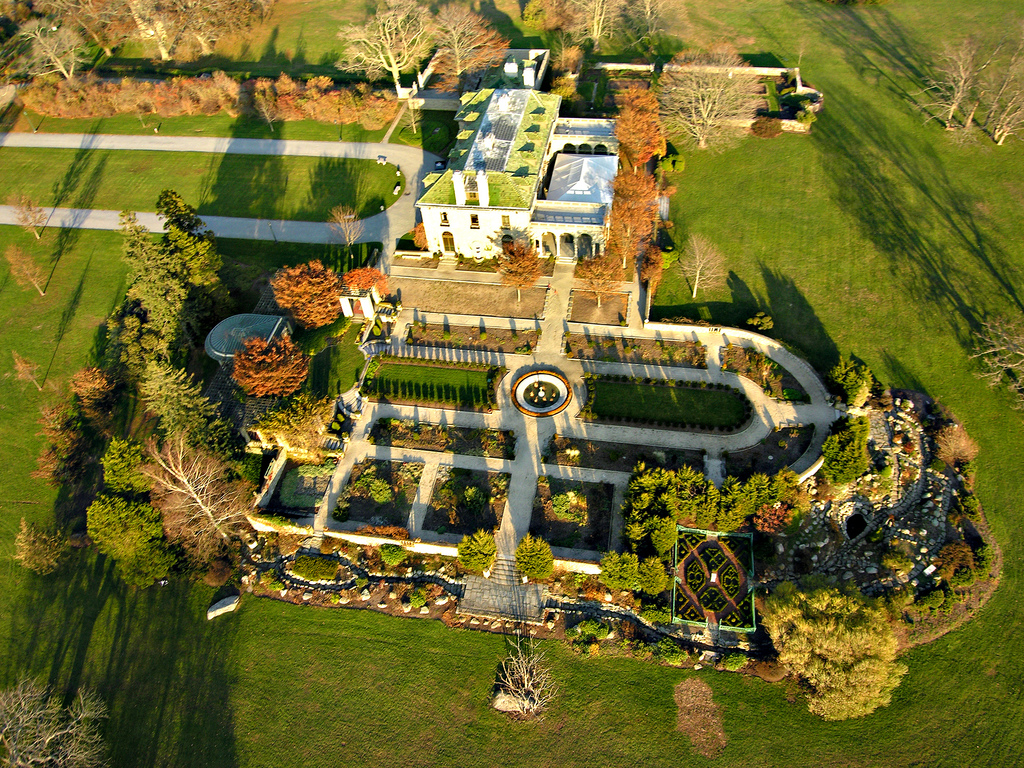
Eolia in Waterford, Connecticut

Edward and Mary Harkness had a number of homes in addition to Harkness House in New York. They spent summers at their Eolia mansion on Long Island Sound in Waterford, Connecticut, near where Mary had visited her grandparents in the summers. The home and 230 acres (93 ha) of ornamental gardens and grounds are now maintained by the State of Connecticut as Harkness Memorial State Park. They also owned another house on Long Island in Manhasset, New York, on 186 acres, called Weekend, like their New York City mansion designed by James Gamble Rogers. They had additional houses in North Carolina and in San Diego, California, and a camp at the Ausable Club in the Adirondacks. The Harknesses used their steam yacht Steveana (named after his parents) to commute between Long Island and the city. For longer trips they used their Pullman car Pelham, named after Pelham, Massachusetts, where the Harkness family started in America.

Harkness was an avid golfer and was a member of the Jekyll Island Club in Georgia, Cypress Point Club, The Creek Club in Locust Valley, the Valley Club of Monteceito in Santa Barbara and Yeamans Hall Club outside Charleston, South Carolina, another James Gamble Rogers golf and winter community. He was also a member of the Racquet and Tennis Club in New York City.

== Burial ==
Edward and Mary Harkness are buried in Woodlawn Cemetery in The Bronx, New York City, which is today a National Historic Landmark. The Harkness family mausoleum is stately, designed to resemble a small medieval church, and includes a walled and locked private garden. It is not marked with the family name.

== Legacy ==
In addition to the family-funded foundations, Harkness, along with another wealthy neighbor, Edward Crowninshield Hammond, was the inspiration for Eugene O'Neill's off-stage character "Harker", the "Standard Oil millionaire", in Long Day's Journey into Night, and on-stage figure "T. Stedman Harder" in A Moon for the Misbegotten.
