= Frances Macgregor =

American sociologist and photographer

- Born: Frances Cooke; April 21, 1906; Portland, Oregon
- Died: December 24, 2001 (aged 95); Carmel, California
- Spouse: Gordon Macgregor

Frances Cooke Macgregor (April 21, 1906 – December 24, 2001) was an American sociologist and photographer.

== Books ==
- This is America, a 1942 book with text by First Lady Eleanor Roosevelt and photographs by Frances Cooke Macgregor
