= Harkness Memorial State Park =

Historic preservation area in Connecticut

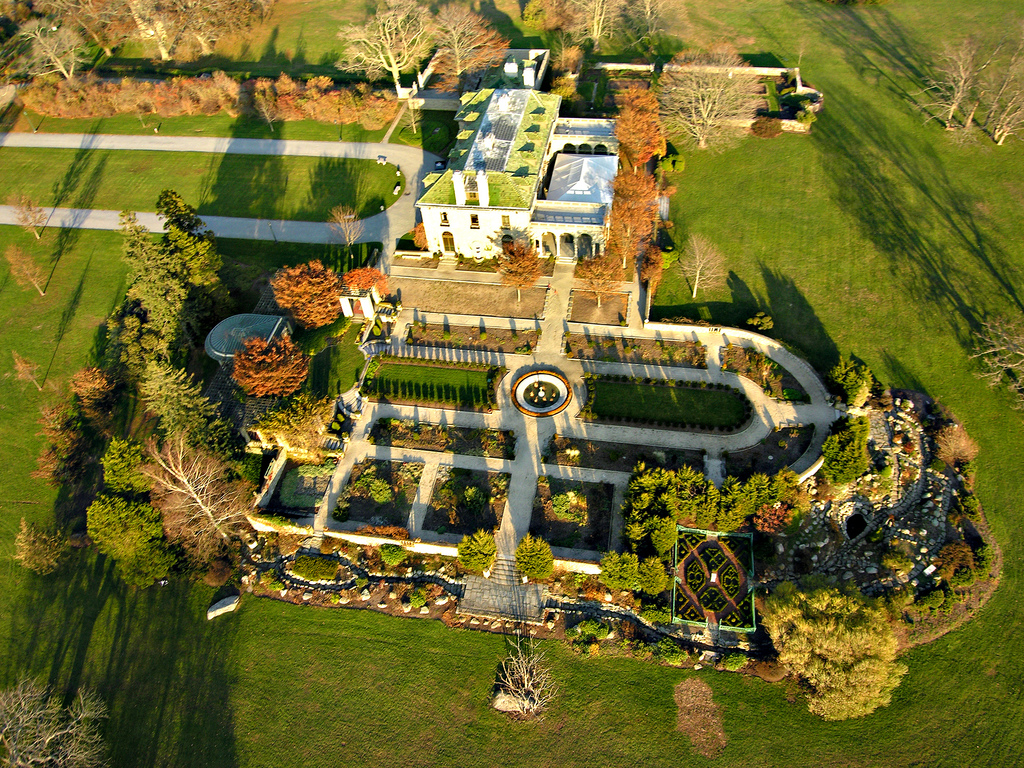
- The mansion and gardens from above

- Location within Connecticut Location within the United States
- Location: Waterford, Connecticut
- Coordinates: 41°18′18″N 72°06′48″W
- Area: 304 acres (123 ha)
- Elevation: 30 ft (9.1 m)
- Established: 1950
- Administrator: Connecticut Department of Energy and Environmental Protection
- Designation: Connecticut state park
- Website: Official website
- Eolia—The Harkness Estate
- U.S. National Register of Historic Places
- U.S. Historic district
- Location: Great Neck Road, Waterford, Connecticut
- Area: 220 acres (89 ha)
- Built: 1906-1907
- Architect: Lord & Hewlett; et al.
- Architectural style: Late 19th and 20th Century Revivals, Second Renaissance Revival
- NRHP reference No.: 86003331
- Added to NRHP: November 20, 1986

Harkness Memorial State Park is a historic preservation area located on Long Island Sound in Waterford, Connecticut. The state park's 304 acres (123 ha) center around Eolia, a 42-room Renaissance Revival mansion with formal gardens and greenhouses. The park is managed by the Connecticut Department of Energy and Environmental Protection.

== History ==
The park was the summer home of philanthropists Edward and Mary Harkness, who inherited the fortune created by Edward's father, Stephen V. Harkness, a substantial investor in John D. Rockefeller's Standard Oil. The mansion was designed by the New York architectural firm of Lord & Hewlett, constructed in 1906–07. Also on the grounds of the Harkness estate are a carriage house that was built in 1908 and a water tower built in 1910, which were both designed by architect James Gamble Rogers. From 1918 to 1929, landscape designer Beatrix Jones Farrand made extensive improvements to the grounds, adding numerous formal gardens.

Mrs. Harkness left the property to the State of Connecticut in 1950, and it became part of the state park system in 1952. Eolia—The Harkness Estate was listed on the National Register of Historic Places in 1986 as a 220-acre (89 ha) historic district with 15 contributing buildings and two other contributing structures.

== Activities and amenities ==
The park offers mansion tours, picnicking, and shoreline fishing as well as private event rentals.

== Gallery ==
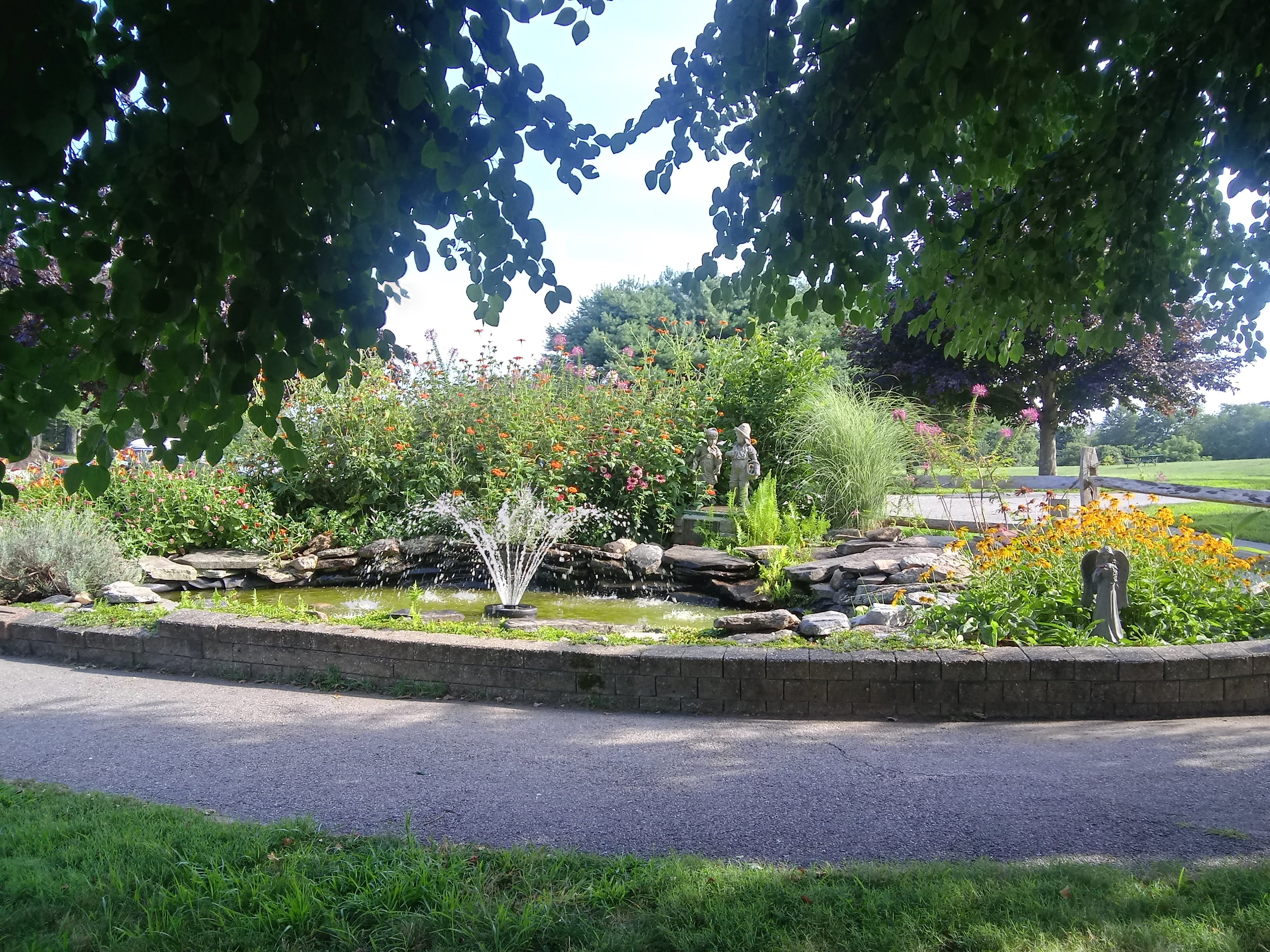

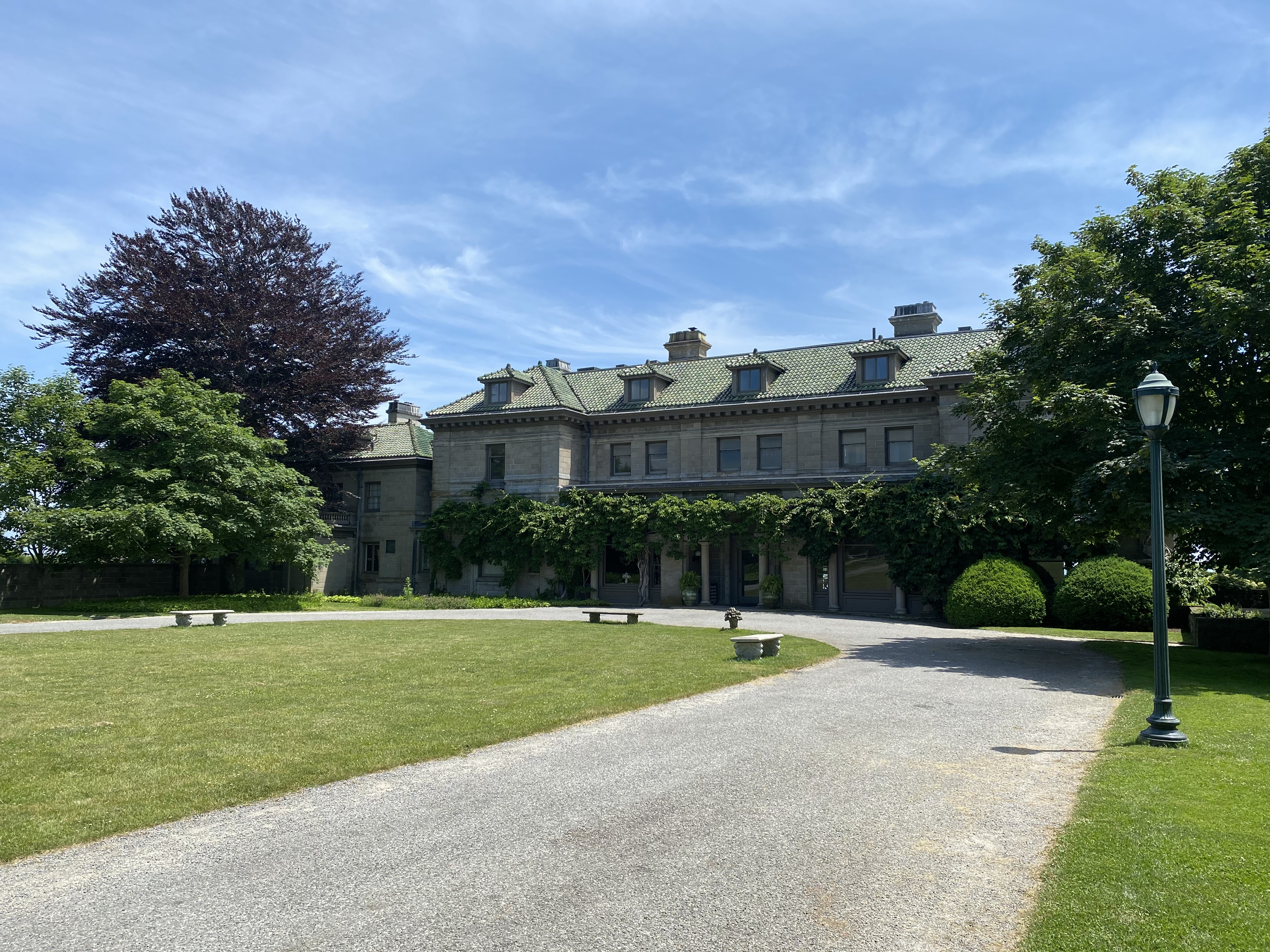

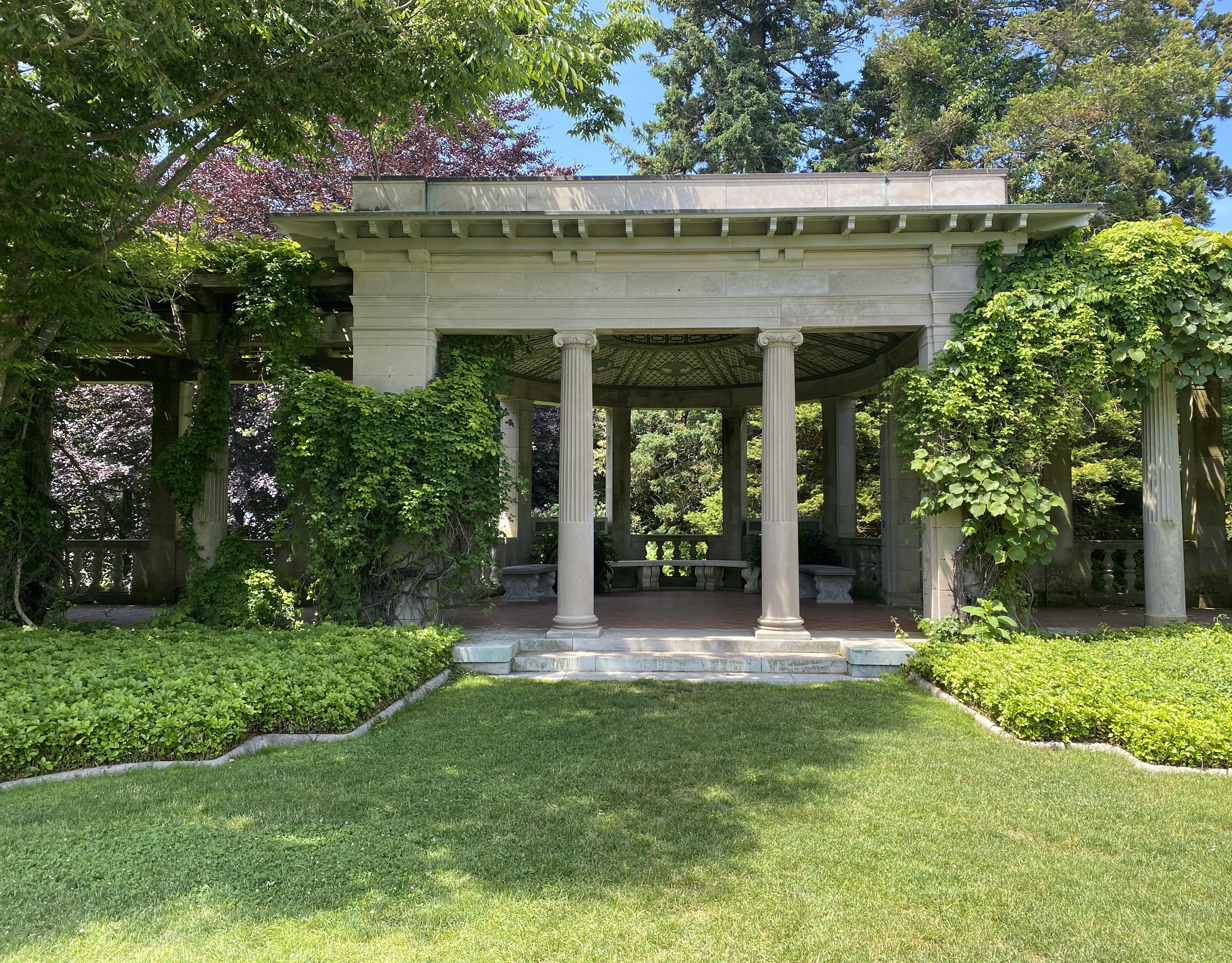

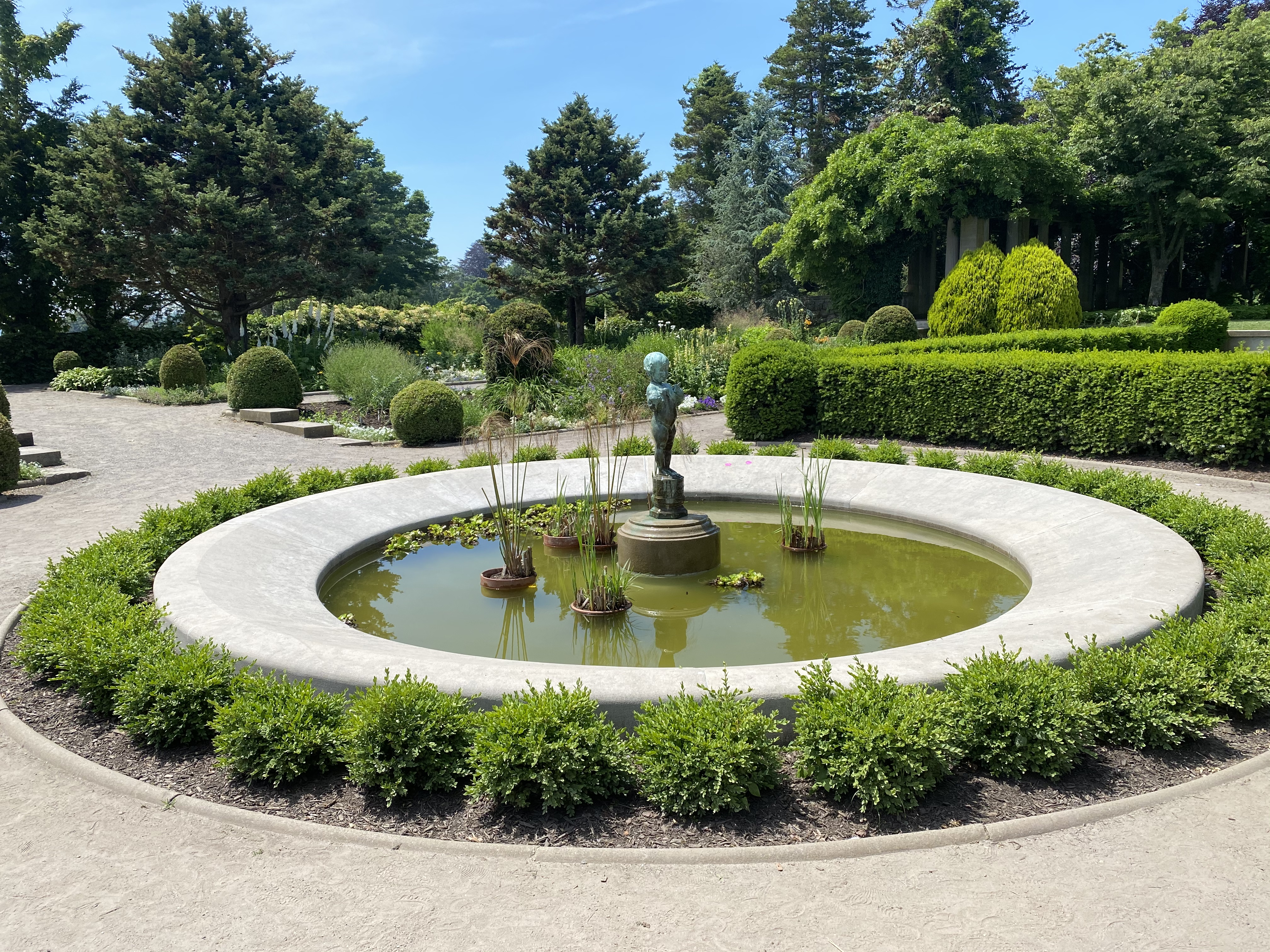

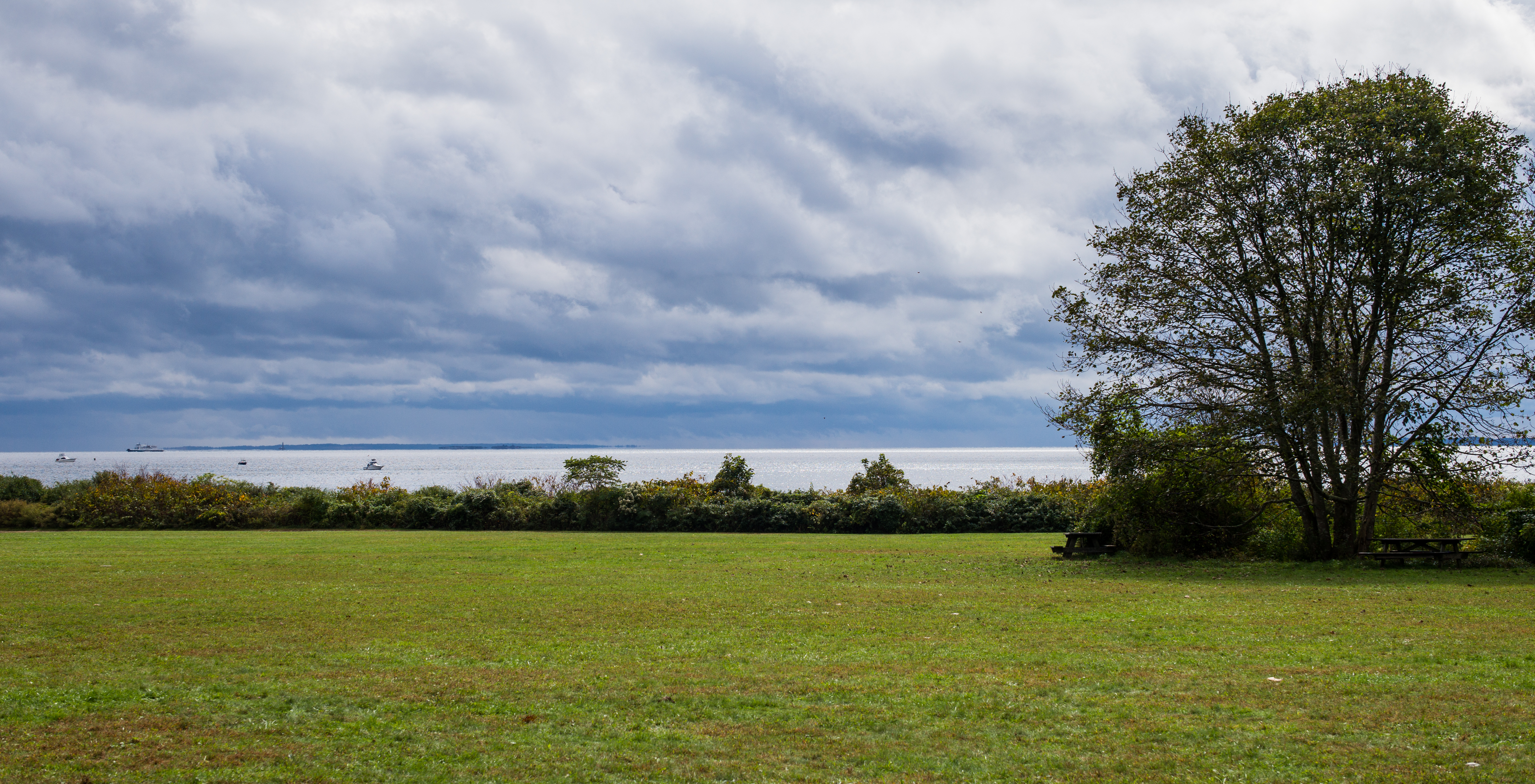

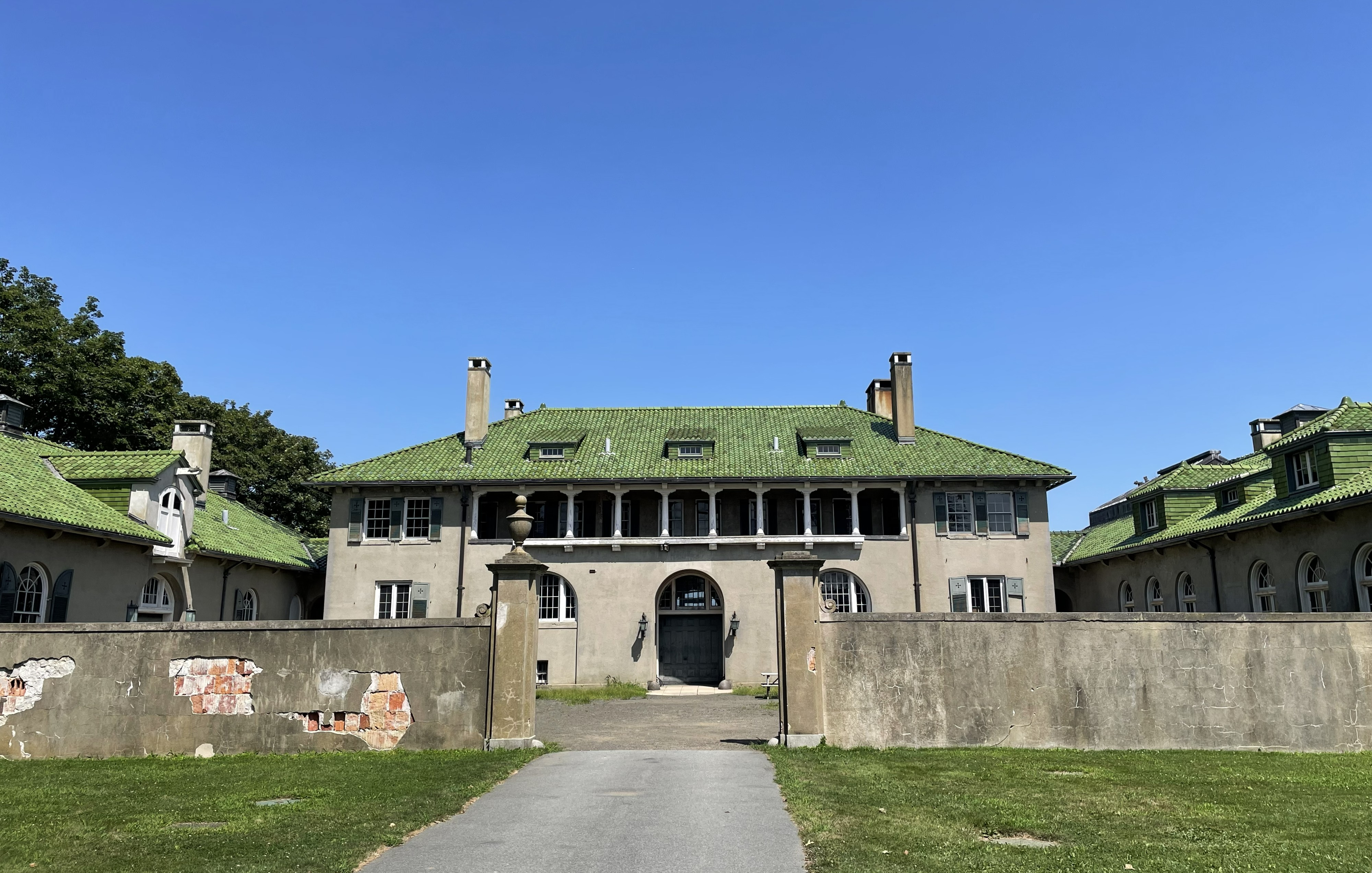

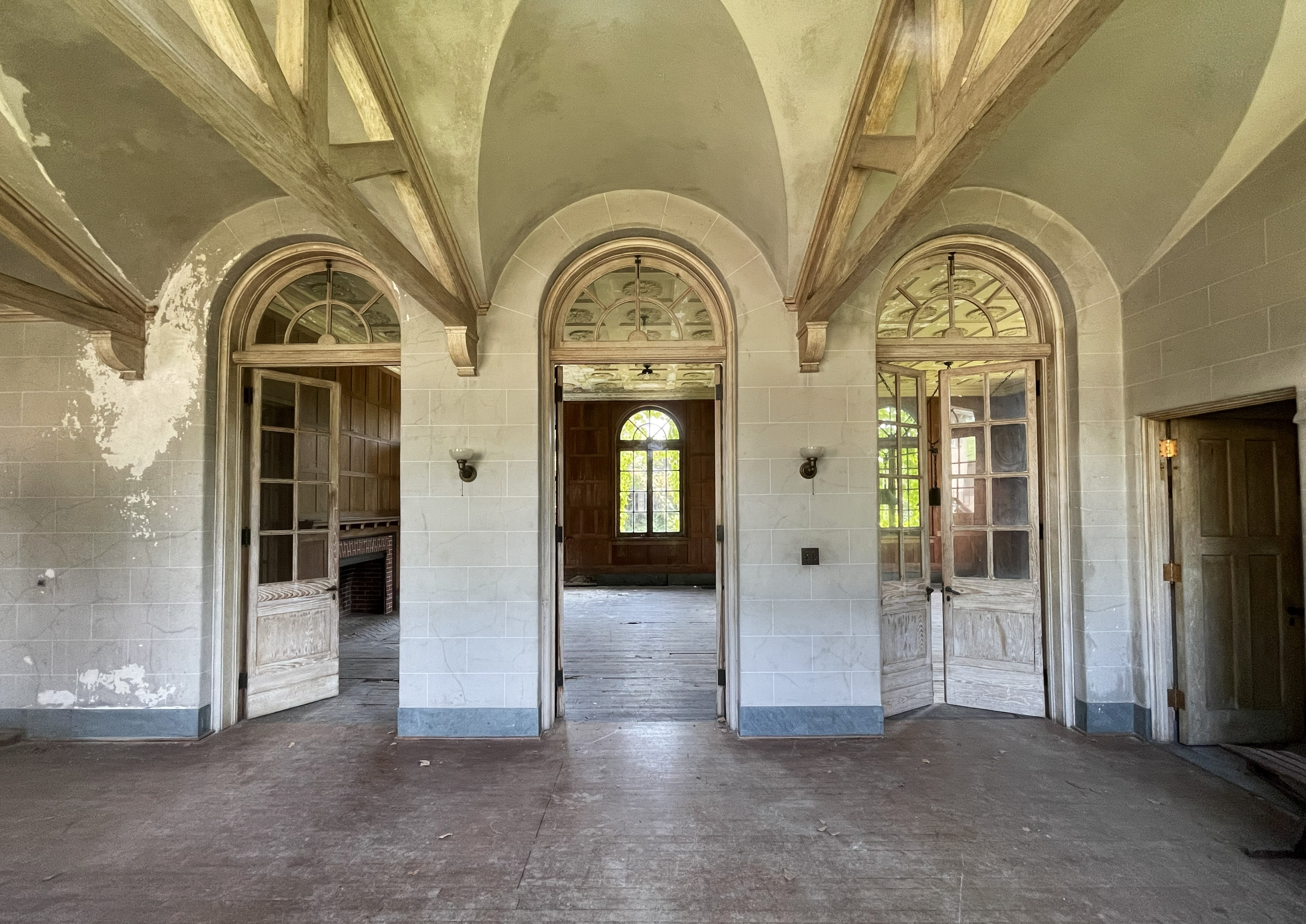

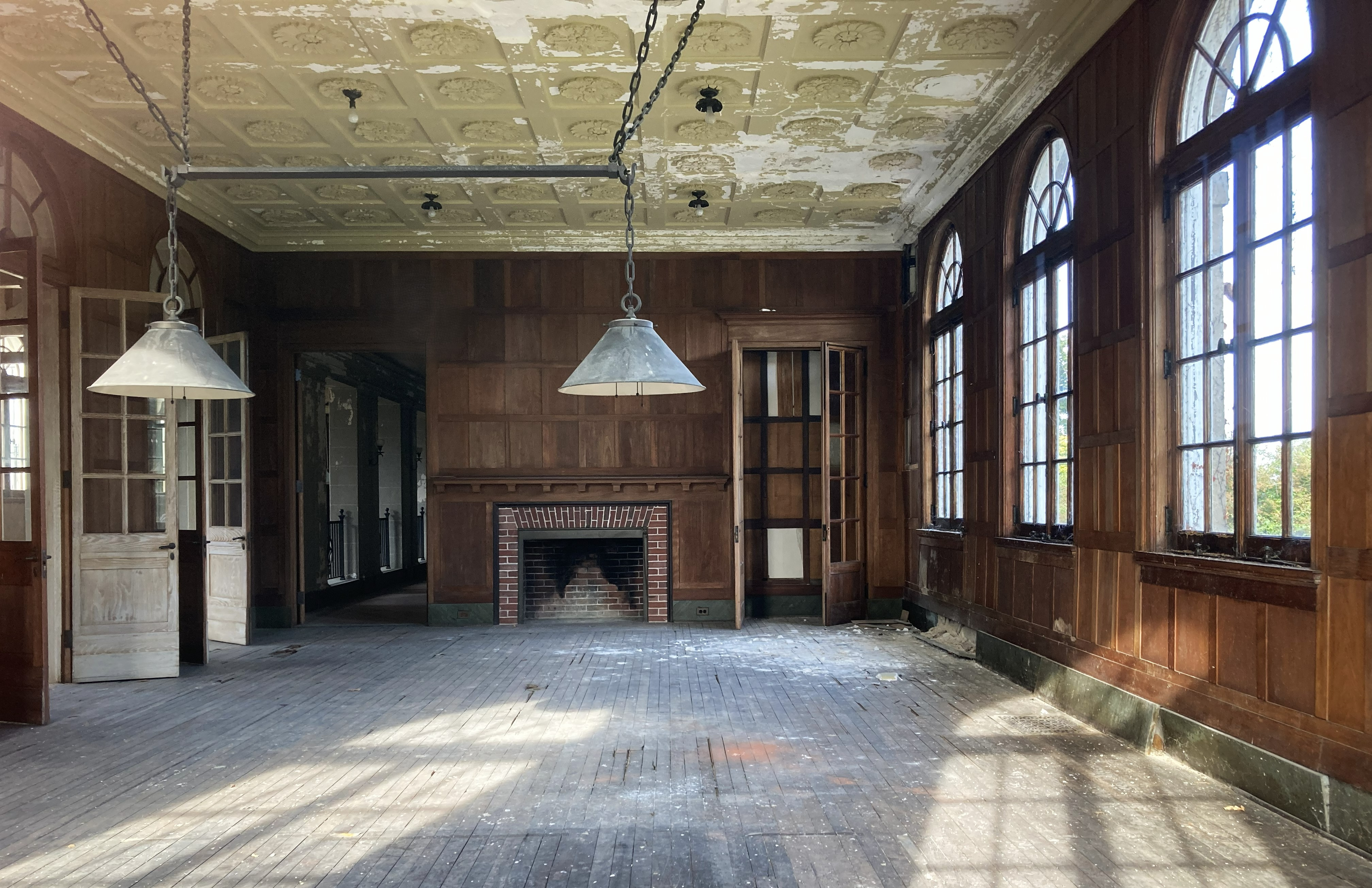

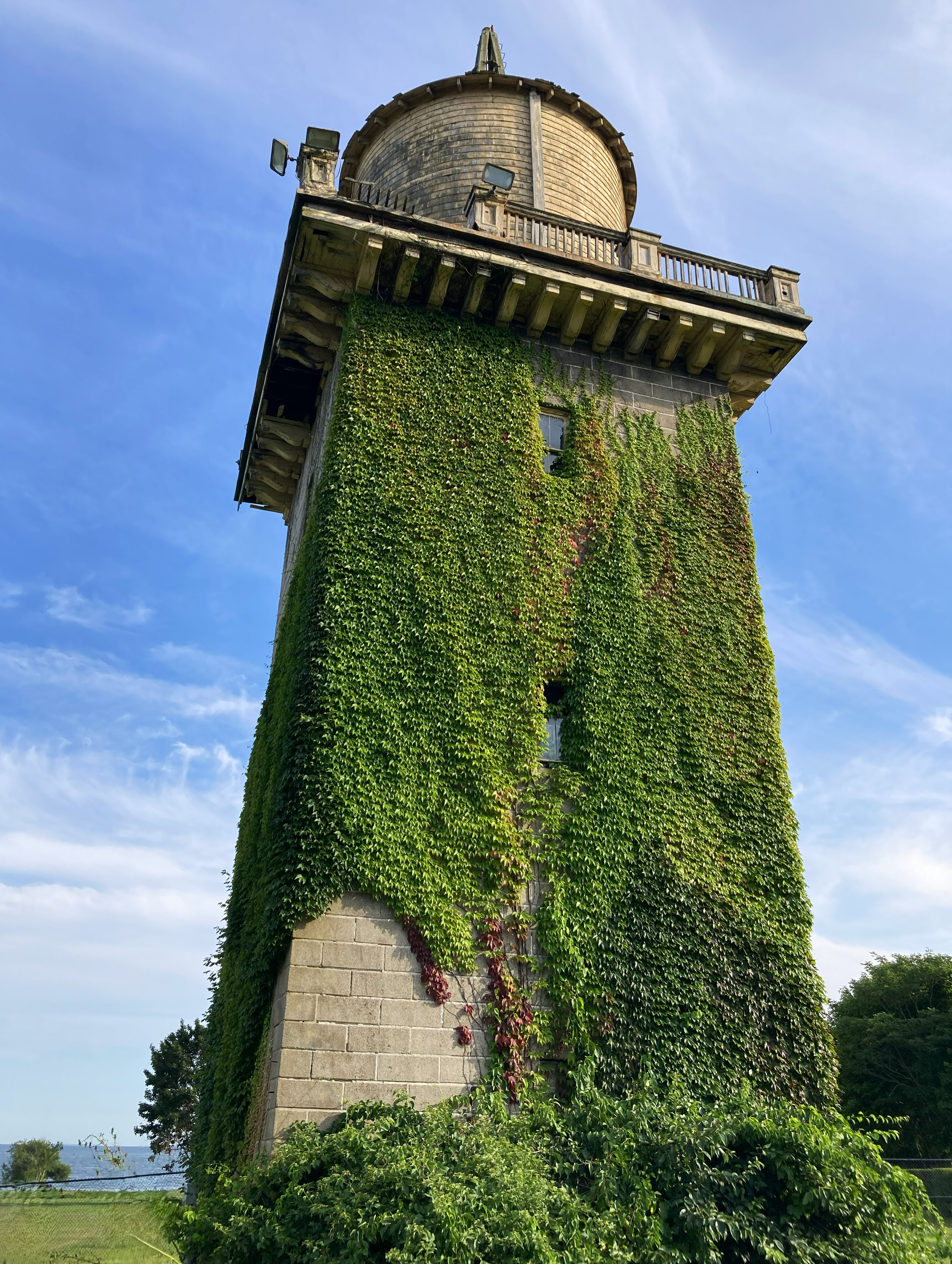

== See also ==
- List of botanical gardens in the United States
- National Register of Historic Places listings in New London County, Connecticut
