= Joseph Outerbridge =

Bermudian–Newfoundland businessman and philanthropist (1843–1933)

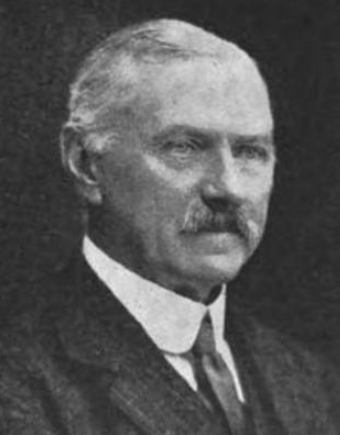
- Born: January 7, 1843; Pembroke Parish, Bermuda
- Died: October 11, 1933 (aged 90); Philadelphia, Pennsylvania U.S.
- Occupation: Businessman
- Spouse: Maria Harvey Tucker (m. 1881)
- Children: 6

Sir Joseph Outerbridge (7 January 1843 – 11 October 1933) was a prominent Bermudian businessman and philanthropist in Newfoundland.

== Early life ==
Joseph Outerbridge was born in Pembroke, Bermuda, British North America, on 7 January 1843, the son of Alexander Ewing Outerbridge and Laura Catherine Harvey, who had married in 1840. The Outerbridges are a prominent Bermudian family based in Bailey's Bay, an unincorporated community in Hamilton Parish, with branches in the United States and Canada. Alexander Ewing Outerbridge was a shipping merchant, and moved his family to Philadelphia in 1844.

Two of Joseph Outerbrige's brothers, Albert Albouy and Alexander Outerbridge, and three sisters, Catherine Tucker (Mrs. Aubrey George Butterfield), Harriet and Laura Outerbridge, remained in Pennsylvania (a fourth sister, Mary Ewing Outerbridge, died aged thirty-one on Staten Island in 1886), at Chestnut Hill and Germantown, while three other brothers, Augustus Emelius, Eugenius Harvey, and Adolphus Outerbridge, became merchants in New York. Eugenius Harvey Outerbridge also became the first chairman of the Port of New York Authority.

== Career ==
Following his education at St. Mark's School in Philadelphia, Joseph Outerbridge moved to St. John's, Newfoundland in 1862 at the age of nineteen to work with his uncle in Newfoundland's oldest company, Harvey & Company Ltd. (founded in 1767). He became the senior director of the firm, and devoted considerably to philanthropic causes. He was a friend and supporter of Dr. Sir Wilfred Thomason Grenfell, and involved himself in the improvement of the conditions of the fishermen of Labrador. He represented the Newfoundland Chamber of Commerce and the Government of Newfoundland in tariff negotiations with the Government of Canada at Ottawa in 1879. He was Treasurer of the Fire Relief Fund from 1892 to 1894, following the Great Fire that devastated St. John's in 1892, and was thanked by the British Government for his efforts. He was the Commanding Officer of the Church Lads' Brigade from 1890 to 1894. He was the Vive-Chairman of the reception committee for the royal visit by the Duke and Duchess of Cornwall and York to Newfoundland in 1901. He assisted in raising funds for the 1911 Festival of Empire as Chairman of the Newfoundland Festival of Empire Committee, and was the representative for Newfoundland at the festival in London, where he arranged for the Newfoundland Building and Exhibition at Crystal Palace. He was created a Knight Bachelor by King George V on 2 June 1913. During the First World War, he was the Vice President of the Patriotic Association of Newfoundland, which raised and maintained the Newfoundland Regiment (which was built on the framework of the Church Lads' Brigade).

== Family ==
Joseph Outerbridge married on 7 November 1881 to Maria Harvey Tucker of Halifax, who also belonged to a prominent family centred in Bermuda. The couple had five sons and one daughter. Lieutenant-Colonel Sir Leonard Cecil Outerbridge MBE, DSO, had been commissioned into the 10th Regiment, Royal Grenadiers, in 1912, and joined the CEF in 1915. He served with the 35th and 75th Battalions, and on the staffs of the first Canadian Infantry Brigade and the Fourth Canadian Division. He was twice mentioned-in-despatches and awarded the Distinguished Service Order. He became a director of Harvey & Co. Ltd, the Honorary Colonel of the Newfoundland Regiment in 1949, and was the Lieutenant-Governor of Newfoundland from 1949 to 1957. Lieutenant Norman Outerbridge served in the 1st Battalion, The Newfoundland Regiment, and was killed at Monchy-le-Preux on 14 April 1917. Captain Herbert Outerbridge, MBE, also served on the Western Front in the 1st Battalion, Newfoundland Regiment, surviving the war. He was also a director of Harvey & Co., Ltd. Edmund Outerbridge became the Managing Director of Outerbridge & Daly, Ltd. Basil Outerbridge worked for Montreal Light, Heat and Power Consolidated. Lilian Outerbridge married Captain J.D. Campbell, MVO, OBE, of the Royal Navy.

== Death ==
Sir Joseph was still working for Harvey & Co., Ltd., at the age of eighty-nine. At the age of ninety years he underwent an operation for a serious condition in Philadelphia on 2 October 1933, but was too weakened by age to recuperate. He died in Philadelphia on 11 October. The Te Deum Window in St. John's Cathedral of St. John the Baptist was donated in 1952 by the Outerbridge family in memory of Sir Joseph Outerbridge.
