= Leonard Outerbridge =

Lieutenant Governor of Newfoundland

Colonel The Honourable Sir Leonard Outerbridge CC, CBE, DSO, CD

2nd Lieutenant Governor of Newfoundland
- In office September 15, 1949 – December 16, 1957
- Monarchs: George VI; Elizabeth II
- Governors General: The Viscount Alexander of Tunis; Vincent Massey
- Premier: Joey Smallwood
- Preceded by: Albert Walsh
- Succeeded by: Campbell Macpherson

Personal details
- Born: May 6, 1888 Asheville, North Carolina, United States
- Died: September 6, 1986 (aged 98) St. John's, Newfoundland, Canada
- Parents: Joseph Outerbridge (father); Maria Harvey Outerbridge (mother)
- Education: Marlborough College, University of Toronto
- Occupation: lawyer

Military service
- Allegiance: Canada
- Branch/service: Canadian Expeditionary Force
- Rank: Colonel
- Battles/wars: First World War

Sir Leonard Cecil Outerbridge, CC, CBE, DSO, CD (May 6, 1888 – September 6, 1986) was the second lieutenant governor of Newfoundland from 1949 to 1957. In 1967, he became a Companion of the Order of Canada.

== Biography ==
Leonard Outerbridge was born in Asheville, North Carolina, on May 6, 1888, the son of Sir Joseph Outerbridge and Lady Maria Harvey Outerbridge (born Tucker), who were Bermudian residents of the Colony of Newfoundland. He was educated at Bishop Feild College in St. John's, Marlborough College in England, and finished a law degree at the University of Toronto, where he was a Member of Alpha Delta Phi.

Outerbridge served in the Canadian forces, during the Great War, reaching the rank of Colonel. After the war he worked as a lawyer in Toronto for a year before returning to St. John's to help his brother, Herbert, manage Harvey and Company Ltd.

From 1923 to 1924, Outerbridge was president of the Newfoundland Board of Trade, and in 1925 headed the Charity Organization Bureau. From 1930 to 1944, he was honorary private secretary to successive governors. For the last three years of the Second World War, Outerbridge volunteered full-time as director of Civil Defence, supervising the Air Raids Precaution Team. He was knighted in 1946 "for services as Honorary Private Secretary to the Governor of Newfoundland" as announced in the 1946 King's Birthday Honours.

During the second referendum in 1948, Outerbridge was one of a group of Water Street merchants who supported confederation. In 1949, he succeeded Sir Albert Walsh, who was installed on a temporary basis, as the second lieutenant-governor of Newfoundland.

Outerbridge, not Walsh, was Smallwood's initial choice for Newfoundland's first lieutenant-governor. As a confederation supporter, he was instrumental in gaining support from Newfoundland merchants. Upon the signing of the Terms of Union, Smallwood actually announced Outerbridge's appointment to the position but Canadian Prime Minister Louis St. Laurent and Outerbridge felt the declaration too hasty. Fearing the public would suspect patronage, Outerbridge was reluctant to take the position. It was decided Albert Walsh would become the first lieutenant-governor of the new Canadian province of Newfoundland, and Outerbridge succeeded him less than a year later. His term as lieutenant-governor lasted for eight years. He was made Knight of Grace of St. John of Jerusalem in 1951.

After his term, Outerbridge became president of Harvey and Company Limited. In the 1970s he became chair of the company and still held the position at 90. Outerbridge was appointed a Companion of the Order of Canada in 1967. He received a special service award for his work as director of the Canadian National Institute for the Blind in 1983, and, in 1985, he was made a Companion of the Order of the Red Cross. He died in St. John's on September 6, 1986.

== See also ==
- Harvela Investments Ltd v. Royal Trust of Canada (CI) Ltd [1986] AC 207, an English contract law case, in which Sir Leonard Outerbridge was involved shortly before his death.
