= Eugenius Harvey Outerbridge =

American businessman (1860-1932)

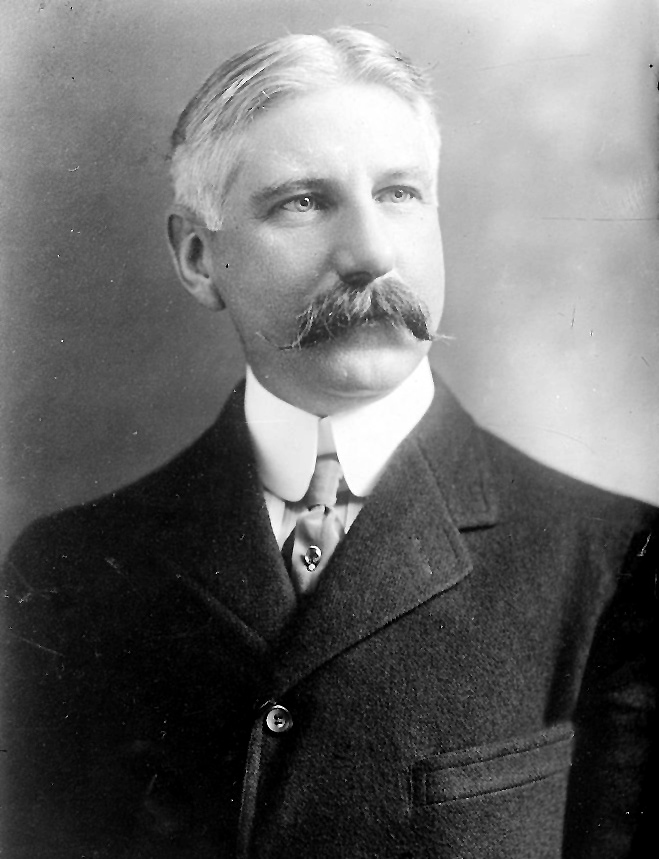

Chair of the Port Authority of New York and New Jersey
- In office 1921–1924
- Preceded by: position established
- Succeeded by: Julian Gregory

Personal details
- Born: March 8, 1860 Philadelphia, Pennsylvania, U.S.
- Died: November 10, 1932 (aged 72) Manhattan, New York, U.S.
- Parent(s): Alexander Ewing Outerbridge (1816–1900); Laura Catherine Harvey (1818–1867)
- Relatives: Mary Ewing Outerbridge, sister
- Known for: Homasote; Outerbridge Crossing

Eugenius Harvey Outerbridge (March 8, 1860 – November 10, 1932) was a businessman and promoter of patent fiberboard, and the first chairman of the interstate agency known then as the Port of New York Authority. The Outerbridge Crossing, a Port Authority bridge, was named for him.

== Biography ==
Eugenius was born on March 8, 1860, in Philadelphia, Pennsylvania, to Bermudians Alexander Ewing Outerbridge I and Laura Catherine Harvey. His sister, Mary Ewing Outerbridge, was the founder, in 1874, of American lawn tennis which was the progenitor of modern tennis. His other siblings include Albert Albany Outerbridge, Sir Joseph Outerbridge (1843–1933), August Emelio Outerbridge (1846–1921), Harriett Harvey Outerbridge, Alexander Ewing Outerbridge II, Laura Catharine Outerbridge and Adolph John Harvey Outerbridge (1858–1928).

Outerbridge incorporated the Agasote Millboard Company in 1909 to produce a high-density fiberboard. The company used the material to produce roof panels for railroad cars and automobiles. In 1916, the company introduced Vehisote, a versatile fiberboard made from recycled materials, made by the company in West Trenton, New Jersey. Both the product and the company were later renamed as Homasote, and remain in active production as of 2022.

Outerbridge was the first chairman of the Port of New York Authority, now the Port Authority of New York and New Jersey. The new authority was founded on April 30, 1921, and was the first interstate agency created under a clause of the US Constitution permitting compacts between states.

Outerbridge was among the founding organizers of the Richmond County Country Club on Staten Island in 1888. He was a longtime member of the Union Club of the City of New York and, until his death, he was chairman of the Building Committee in charge of planning the 69th Street clubhouse.

Outerbridge died the morning of November 10, 1932 at a hospital in New York City after a brief illness. His funeral would be held on November 12 at St. James' Episcopal Church in Manhattan near his 950 Park Avenue residence.

== Legacy ==
The Outerbridge Crossing, a toll bridge between Staten Island, New York, and Perth Amboy, New Jersey, is named in his honor. It opened on June 29, 1928.

== See also ==
- Austin Tobin
- Robert Moses
- Othmar Ammann
- Christopher O. Ward

Preceded by position established	Chairman of the Port of New York Authority; 1921–1924	Succeeded by Julian Gregory
Preceded by Seth Low	President of the Chamber of Commerce of the State of New York; 1916–1917	Succeeded by Alfred Erskine Marling
