= Presbyterian Hospital (New York City) =

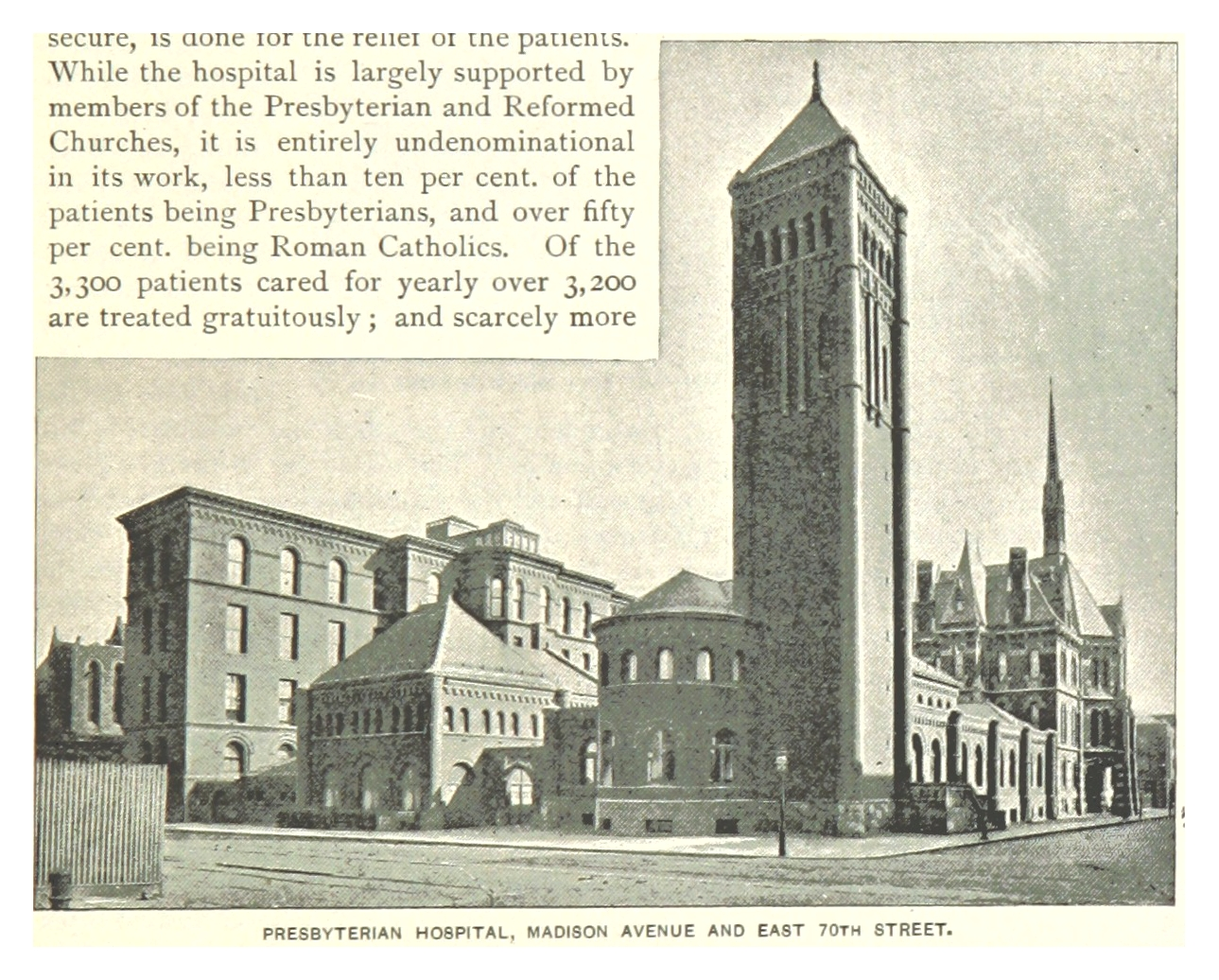
- The original Presbyterian Hospital located Madison Avenue and East 70th Street

Geography
- Location: Manhattan, New York, United States
- Coordinates: 40.842159°N 73.942823°W

History
- Opened: 1868
- Closed: Merged into NewYork–Presbyterian Hospital in 1998

Links
- Lists: Hospitals in New York State
- Other links: Hospitals in Manhattan

Presbyterian Hospital is a New York City hospital. It was founded in 1868 and began operations in 1872. It was originally located between East 70th Street and 71st Streets and Madison and Park Avenue. The hospital expanded continuously throughout the late 19th century, adding an outpatient dispensary in 1888, a school of nursing in 1892, and additional beds and services in 1892, 1893, 1904 and 1912.

In 1998, Presbyterian Hospital merged with New York Hospital, creating NewYork-Presbyterian Hospital.

== History ==
Presbyterian Hospital is founded by James Lenox in 1868, and began operations in 1872, in buildings designed by Richard Morris Hunt. During the Spanish–American War, World War I and World War II, the hospital operated military wards or overseas hospital bases.

In 1910, the hospital became affiliated with Columbia University's College of Physicians and Surgeons and with other hospitals and institutes in Manhattan, including, in 1925, the Sloane Hospital for Women, an obstetrics and gynecology hospital founded in 1886. It also was affiliated with the Vanderbilt Clinic, Morgan Stanley Children's Hospital, the Neurological Institute of New York, and the New York State Psychiatric Institute.

Around 1920, Edward Harkness joined the hospital's board and donated the land to complete his vision of a combining a medical school and hospital. In 1925, construction began on the Columbia-Presbyterian Medical Center, the first center of its type in the world, in New York City's Washington Heights neighborhood. The hospital moved to a new James Gamble Rogers-designed facility, which included the Harkness Pavilion for private patients and the Squier Urology Clinic, in 1928. The center, now Columbia University Medical Center, is located between West 165th and 168th Streets, between Broadway and Riverside Drive.

In 1998, Presbyterian Hospital merged with New York Hospital to form New York-Presbyterian Hospital, which has six campuses (five in Manhattan and one in Westchester County).

== Architecture ==
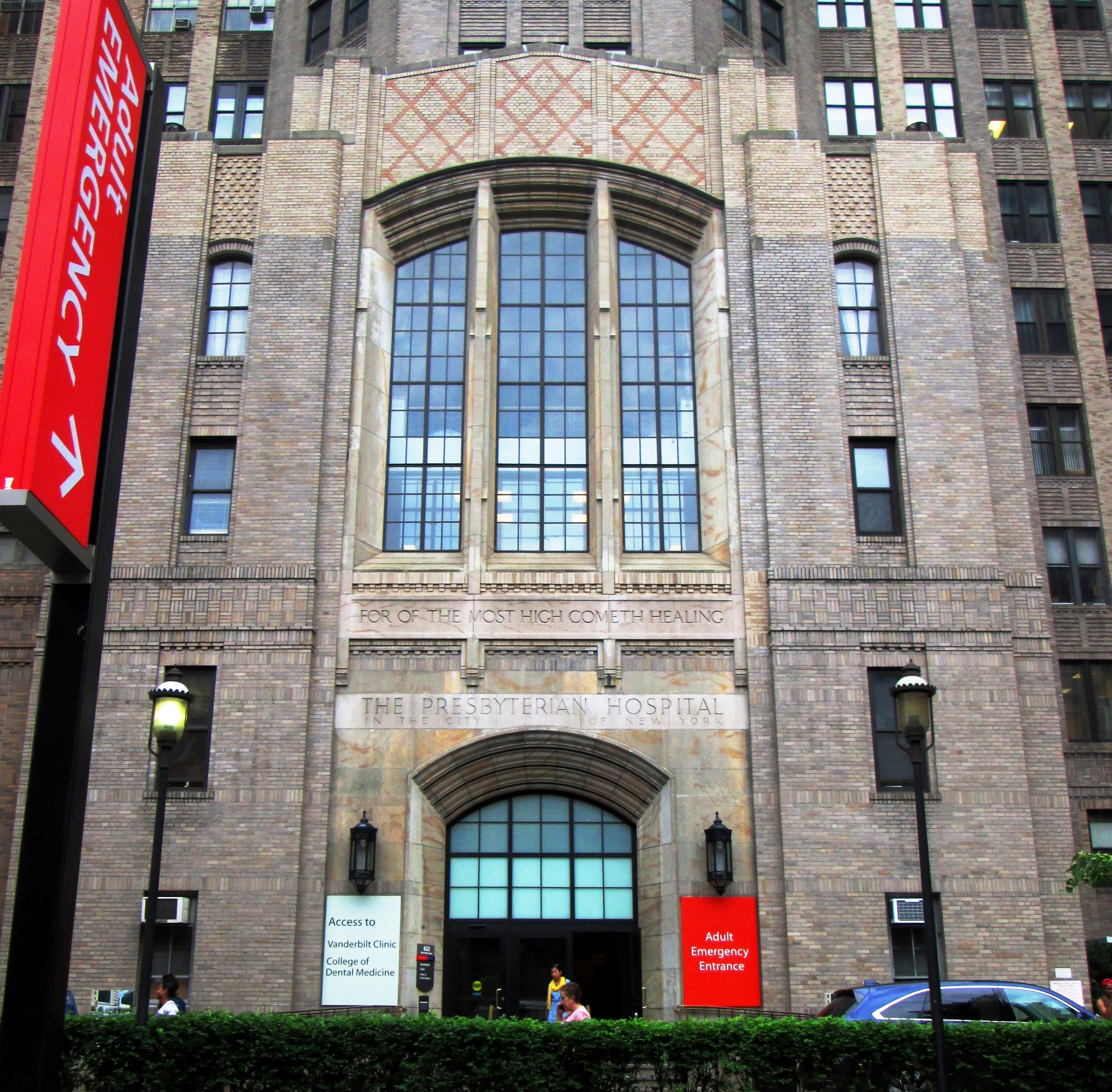
The main entrance to Presbyterian Hospital in the Columbia-Presbyterian Medical Center is now the adult emergency services entrance of the Columbia University campus of NewYork-Presbyterian Hospital

The writer Henry James described the hospital at Madison Avenue and 70th Street in his 1907 book The American Scene as an "exemplary Hospital" and expressing his admiration for the red-bricked building's ability to "invest itself with stillness. It was as if the clamorous city ... [was] forever at rest and no one was stepping lively for miles and miles. [...] I was won over, on the spot."

The Federal Writers' Project's Guide to New York City, published in 1940, extolled the virtues of the 1928 building, and the other original building of the Medical Center, as "among the pioneering structures of the late 1920s when traditional styles were being abandoned in favor of a utilitarian approach," with large flat windows to provide the maximum amount of natural light. The AIA Guide to New York City, on the other hand, says the flat windows are "bulky and banal" and calls the streetscape "a bore".
