= Mary Ewing Outerbridge =

American tennis player

- Born: February 16, 1852; Philadelphia, Pennsylvania, U.S.
- Died: May 3, 1886 (aged 34); New Brighton, New York, U.S.
- Resting place: Silver Mount Cemetery, New York, U.S.
- Known for: Introducing tennis to the U.S.
- Parent(s): Alexander Ewing Outerbridge (1816–1900); Laura Catherine Harvey (1818–1867)
- Relatives: Eugenius Harvey Outerbridge, brother

Mary Ewing Outerbridge (February 16, 1852 – May 3, 1886) was an American woman who imported the lawn game tennis to the United States from Bermuda.

== Biography ==
Mary was born on February 16, 1852, in Philadelphia, Pennsylvania to Bermudians Alexander Ewing Outerbridge (1816–1900) and Laura Catherine Harvey (1818–1867). Her parents had married in Paget Parish, Bermuda in 1840, moving their growing family to the United States before her birth. Four of her siblings had been born in Bermuda: Albert Albouy Outerbridge (1841-1917), Joseph Outerbridge (1843-1933), August Emelius Outerbridge (1846–1921), and Catherine Tucker Outerbridge (1846-1928). Her other siblings were Harriett Harvey Outerbridge (1848-1920), Alexander Ewing Outerbridge II (1850-1928), Laura Catharine Outerbridge (1855-1953), Adolph John Harvey Outerbridge (1858–1928), and Eugenius Harvey Outerbridge (1860-1932), who was the first president of the Port Authority of New York and New Jersey.

The modern game of lawn tennis was first commercialized in 1874 in England by Major Walter Clopton Wingfield of the British Army. While posted to the British Bermuda Garrison in 1874, one of Wingfield's subordinates shared tennis equipment and rules with Outerbridge at Clermont, her family's home in Paget Parish that offered a large, flat lawn. In 1874, Mary returned from Bermuda aboard the ship S.S. Canima. The sporting equipment was initially confiscated by customs officials, but her brother August used his connections in the shipping industry to have the supplies released. She introduced lawn tennis to the United States by setting up the country's first tennis court at the Staten Island Cricket and Baseball Club, near the present-day location of the Staten Island Ferry Terminal. The club was founded on or around March 22, 1872. She played the first tennis game in the US against her sister Laura in Staten Island, New York, on an hourglass-shaped court.

In September 1880, the Staten Island Cricket and Baseball Club held the Tennis Championship of America. The finals were won by O. E. Woodhouse of England, defeating Canadian I. F. Hellmuth. Disputes over tennis court dimensions, net size, racket weight, and ball size among tournament participants prompted Outerbridge's brother Eugenius to support the 1881 formation of the US Tennis Association (USTA) to create uniform regulations.

Outerbridge died on May 3, 1886, at age 34, from kidney inflammation. She had been living with her father, who worked as a clerk, in the New Brighton neighborhood of Staten Island and was buried in Staten Island's Silver Mount Cemetery next to her mother.

== Legacy ==
Mary Outerbridge was inducted into the International Tennis Hall of Fame in 1981 and the Staten Island Sports Hall of Fame in 1999.

Tennis journalist and sportscaster Bud Collins' book History of Tennis identifies competing claims to the introduction of tennis to the United States. First, memoirist Martha Summerhayes described playing tennis at Fort Apache, Arizona with Ella Wilkins Bailey, the wife of an army officer, on October 8, 1874. Second, James Dwight played tennis with his cousin, Fred Sears, in Nahant, Massachusetts in 1875, raising the sport's popularity in New England. Following the October 1880 Beacon Park Open in Boston, the US Open was launched in Newport, Rhode Island, annually played there until moving to New York in 1915. Dwight is typically credited with introducing tennis to the United States because he served as the President of the U.S. Tennis Association from 1882 to 1884 and again from 1894 to 1911.

While tennis player Malcolm Whitman identified records from the New York Custom House documenting Outerbridge's 1874 importation of tennis equipment from Bermuda, this evidence does not prove whether Outerbridge played tennis at the Staten Island Cricket and Baseball Club before Dwight's claim of playing tennis in Massachusetts during 1875.

Noting that Outerbridge's impact was not recognized in The New York Times' obituary section at the time of her death, editor Amisha Padnani included her in the newspaper's Overlooked project through a 2018 belated obituary coinciding with that year's International Women's Day. Padnani argued that regardless of whether Outerbridge was the truly the first to introduce tennis to the United States, her role in popularizing the sport among women led to the inclusion of a Women's National Singles Championship since the 1887 US Open.

== See also ==
- James Dwight
- History of tennis
- List of people from Staten Island § Sports
