= Clarence Whitman Mansion =

Townhouse in Manhattan, New York

Coordinates: 40.774924°N 73.964279°W

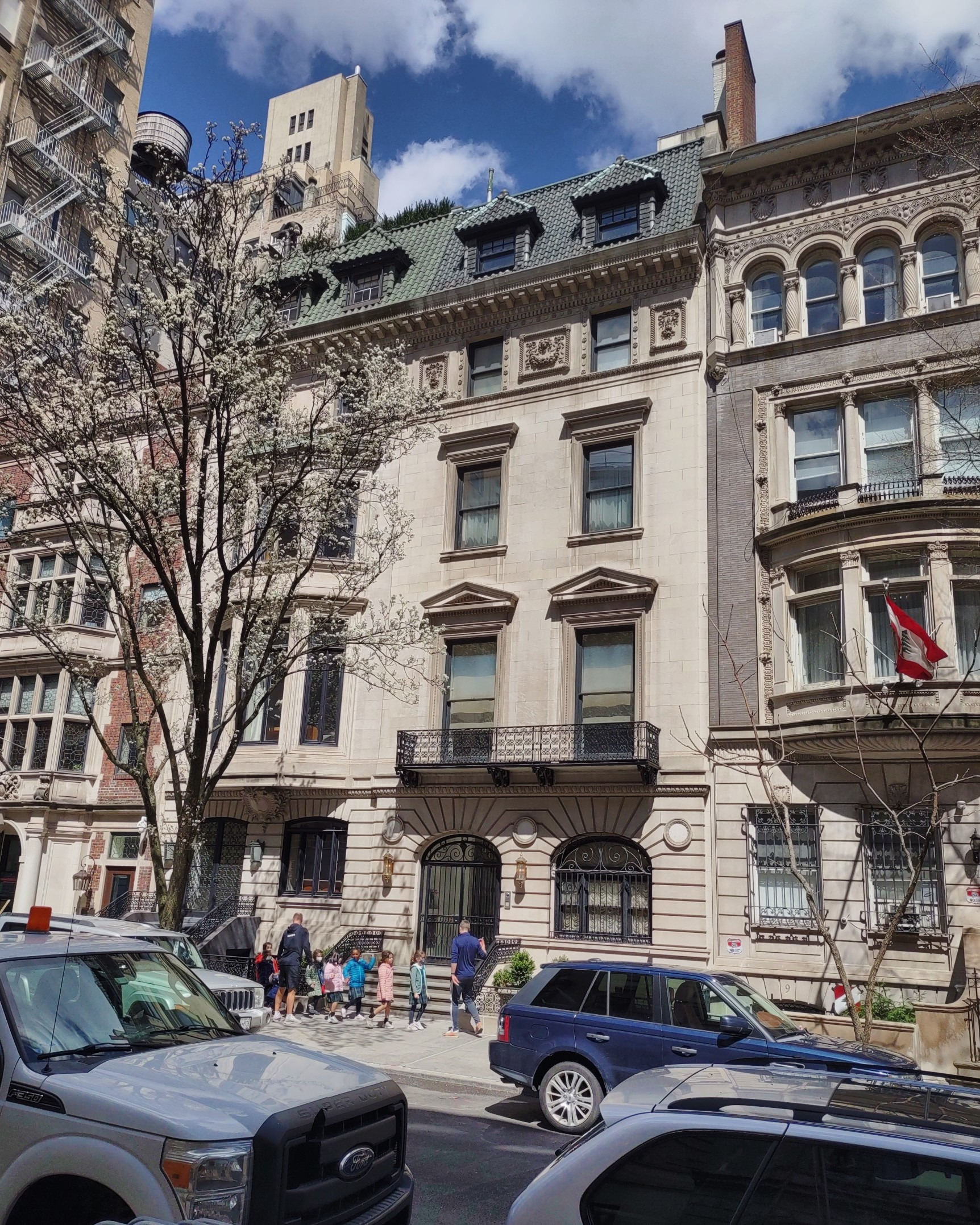
- Interactive map of the Clarence Whitman Mansion area

General information
- Type: Townhouse
- Location: 7 East 76th Street, New York City, United States
- Completed: 1898

Design and construction
- Architect: Parish & Schroeder

The Clarence Whitman Mansion is a townhouse on the Upper East Side of Manhattan in New York City. It was designed in the Renaissance Revival architectural style by Parish & Schroeder and completed in 1898. It belonged to Sam Salz, an art dealer, from the 1940s to the 1970s. It was purchased by Bungo Shimada, a Japanese philanthropist, in 1990.
