= Stephen V. Harkness =

American businessman

Stephen Vanderburgh Harkness
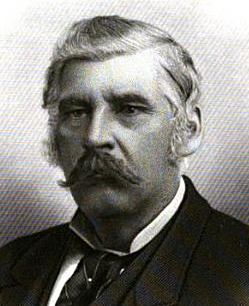
- Born: November 18, 1818; Fayette, New York, U.S.
- Died: March 6, 1888 (aged 69) at sea off Punta Gorda, Florida, U.S.
- Resting place: Lake View Cemetery, Cleveland
- Occupation: Businessman
- Spouses: Laura Osborne (m. 1842; died 1852) Anna M. Richardson (m. 1854)
- Children: Isabella Harkness; David Harkness; Lamon V. Harkness; Charles W. Harkness; Florence Harkness; Edward S. Harkness
- Parent(s): Dr. David M. Harkness, Martha Cook Harkness
- Relatives: Martha A. Harkness Russell (sister) Daniel M. Harkness (half-brother) Henry Flagler (stepmother’s son)

Stephen Vanderburgh Harkness (November 18, 1818 – March 6, 1888) was an American businessman based in Cleveland, Ohio. He invested as a silent partner with John D. Rockefeller, Sr. in the founding of Standard Oil and served as a director of Standard Oil until his death.

== Early life ==
Stephen Harkness was born on November 18, 1818, in Fayette, New York, to David M. Harkness and Martha Cook. His mother died before he turned two, and his father moved with Stephen to the Western Reserve region of Northeast Ohio. He also had a sister Martha A Harkness(Russell) who was born in 1820. They settled in Milan. The widower David married Elizabeth Ann Caldwell Morrison. They had a son, Daniel M. Harkness.

After David died in 1825, the widow Elizabeth took the two boys back to Seneca County, New York, where she had grown up. She married Isaac Flagler, a Presbyterian minister in Milton. They also had a son together, Henry Flagler.

== Career ==
At age twenty-one, after finishing his apprenticeship as a harness maker, Stephen Harkness moved to Bellevue, Ohio with his paternal uncle Lamon G. Harkness. Stephen worked for a time in harness making but in 1855, he set up a distillery in Monroeville, Ohio and it became successful.

In 1864, Stephen Harkness formed a partnership with William Halsey Doan (grandson of one of the original settlers of Cleveland, Ohio) to provide crude oil to refineries. He became quite wealthy through the profits from this industry.

Stephen sold his Monroeville businesses in 1866 and moved to Millionaires Row in Cleveland. There he organized The Euclid Avenue National Bank and was president of Belt Mining Company.

== Oil business ==
Harkness invested heavily with his younger stepbrother Henry Flagler and John D. Rockefeller in Rockefeller, Andrews & Flagler, the corporate forerunner to Standard Oil. Harkness became its second largest shareholder. Although Harkness was a silent partner, he was a member of Standard Oil's Board of Directors until his death in 1888.

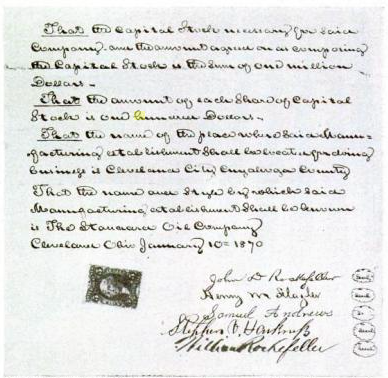
Standard Oil Articles of Incorporation signed by John D. Rockefeller, Henry M. Flagler, Samuel Andrews, Stephen V. Harkness and William Rockefeller

Harkness was active in the development of Cleveland, Ohio. He collaborated with Charles F. Brush and Rockefeller to build the Cleveland Arcade, one of the first enclosed shopping malls in the United States, modeled after the Galleria Vittorio Emanuele II in Milan, Italy.

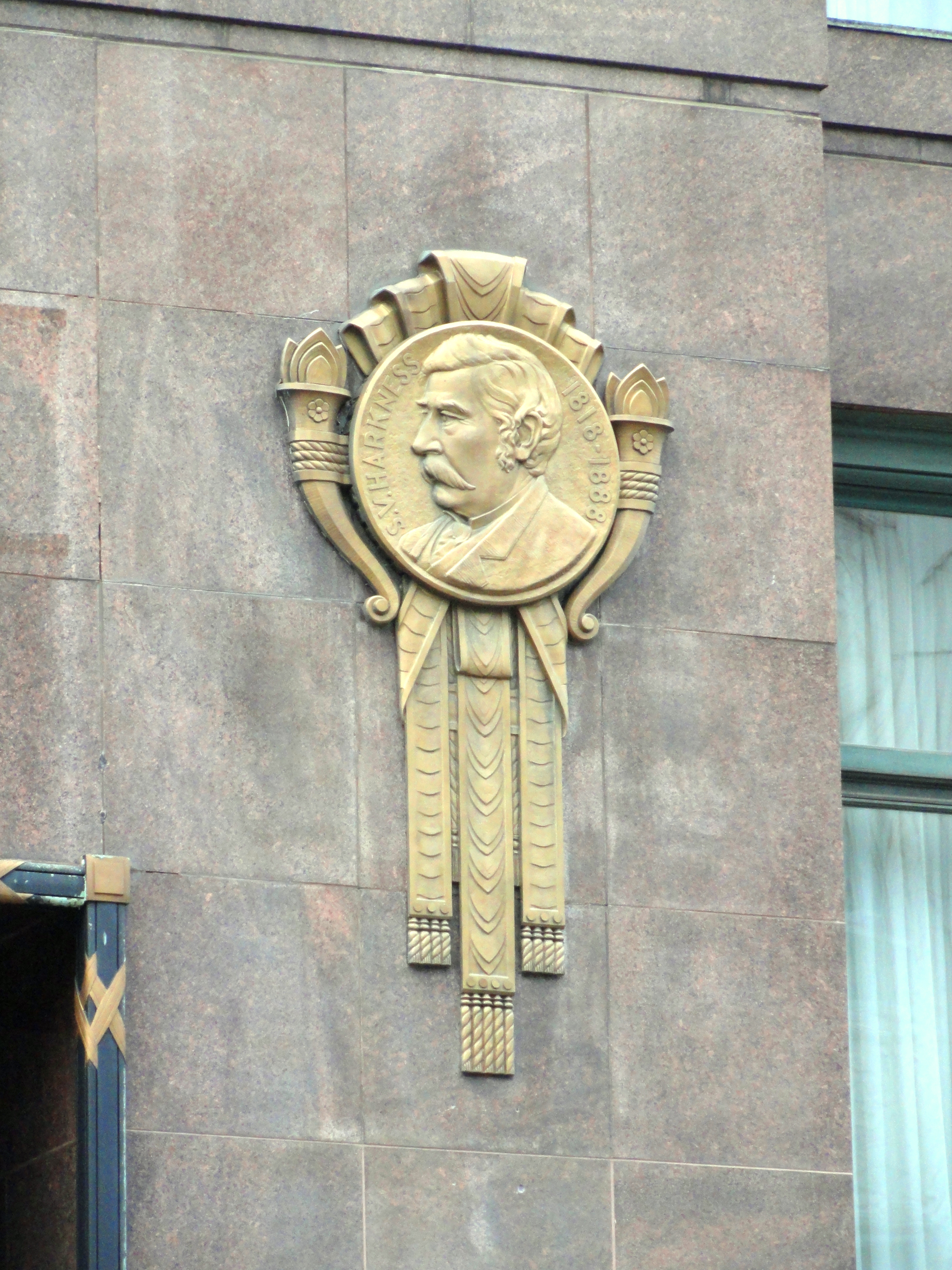
Medallion of S.V. Harkness on the entrance to The Cleveland Arcade

== Personal life ==
In 1842, Stephen Harkness married Laura Osborne. They had three children; two of whom died in their first year. The third lived to the age of 65. Their children were:

- Isabella Harkness (1845-1845)
- David Harkness (1848-1848)
- Lamon Vanderburgh Harkness (1850-1915)

Laura died on August 24, 1852, and was buried in Bellevue, Ohio. Two years after her death, Stephen married Anna M. Richardson. They had three children:

- Charles William Harkness (1860-1916)
- Florence Harkness (1864-1895)
- Edward Stephen Harkness (1874-1940)

On March 6, 1888, Harkness died aboard his yacht. Stephen and Anna Harkness are buried in Cleveland's Lake View Cemetery.

=== Philanthropy ===
After Stephen's death, his widow Anna M. Harkness established the Commonwealth Fund, a foundation dedicated to the improvement of healthcare. Under the guidance of their second son, Edward Harkness, the foundation made charitable gifts totaling more than $129 million, the equivalent of $3.1 billion in 2023 dollars. The fund was a major benefactor of the New York Public Library. Another gift established the Metropolitan Museum of Art's collection of ancient Egyptian art.

In 1925, Stephen's son Edward Harkness established the Harkness Fellowships and then in 1930 the Pilgrim Trust in the UK with an endowment of just over two million pounds, "prompted by his admiration for what Great Britain had done in the 1914-18 war and, by his ties of affection for the land from which he drew his descent." The current priorities of the trust are preservation, places of worship, and social welfare.

Other grants funded educational and medical needs such as: Harkness House, a student cooperative in Oberlin College; St Salvator's Hall at the University of St Andrews; Harkness Chapel at Connecticut College; Butler Library at Columbia University as well as the original portions of the Columbia University Medical Center (Mrs. Harkness, in memory of her husband, helped fund the hospital's Harkness Pavilion). Undergraduate dormitories and buildings at Brown University, Harvard University, Yale University, and Connecticut College were built through Harkness philanthropy. At Yale, Harkness-donated buildings include the Memorial Quadrangle, Harkness Tower, and William L. Harkness Hall. Edward Harkness also made the gifts that established the Yale School of Drama and erected its theatre.

Harkness funds went to several boarding schools, fostering introducing the revolutionary Harkness table method of instruction, starting with Phillips Exeter Academy, and spreading to St. Paul's School, The Lawrenceville School, and Kingswood-Oxford School in West Hartford, Connecticut. Harkness also gave to Taft School, The Hill School, and Phillips Academy.

Harkness' sons Charles and Edward, along with their cousin William L. Harkness, also helped found and sustain The Third Society in 1883 at Yale. This was later known as Wolf's Head Society. (Their Yale classes were: William, 1881; Charles, 1883; Edward, 1897.) The Harkness family donated funds for the society's second hall, on York Street, New Haven, Connecticut.
