= Branford College =

One of the 14 residential colleges at Yale University

- Residential college at Yale University
- Yale University
- Coat of arms of Branford College
- Location: 74 High Street
- Coordinates: 41.3098°N 72.9298°W
- Nickname: Branfordians
- Motto: Si id vis, haud somnium est. (Latin)
- Motto in English: If you will it, it is no dream.
- Established: 1933
- Named for: Branford, Connecticut
- Colors: Blue, Green, Gold, White
- Sister college: Quincy House, Harvard; Pembroke College, Oxford; Christ's College, Cambridge
- Head: Enrique M. De La Cruz
- Dean: Amanda Klay
- Undergraduates: 461 (2013-2014)
- Fellows: 209 (2013-2014)
- Mascot: Squirrel
- Website: branford.yalecollege.yale.edu

Branford College is one of the 14 residential colleges at Yale University.

== Founding ==
Branford College was founded in 1933 by partitioning the Memorial Quadrangle (built in 1917-21) into two parts: Saybrook and Branford with Branford being the largest part. In the start of the academic year in 1933, Branford College opened its doors. Clarence Whittlesey Mendell, Dean of Yale College, had been named Master in 1931 and he held the post until 1943. What impressed quite a few visitors to Branford was the calm and subdued character of the College. Chauncey Tinker commented that Saybrook was like an anthill, but Branford was like an oyster bed. In records of the time, the main thing that stands out about Branford is the activity among its students, and of encouragement of activity on the part of Master Mendell, who commented that oyster beds produce pearls.

Branford College was named for the nearby town of Branford, Connecticut, where Yale was briefly located. The base of Harkness Tower, one of the university's most prominent structures and one of the tallest free-standing stone structures in the world, forms one corner of Branford's main courtyard. The tower contains a 54-bell carillon. Frank Lloyd Wright is said to have been asked where he would choose to be if he could be anywhere in the U.S. and responded that he would pick Harkness Tower so he would not have to look at it. Since Branford's courtyards have many squirrels, the college adopted the squirrel as its mascot.

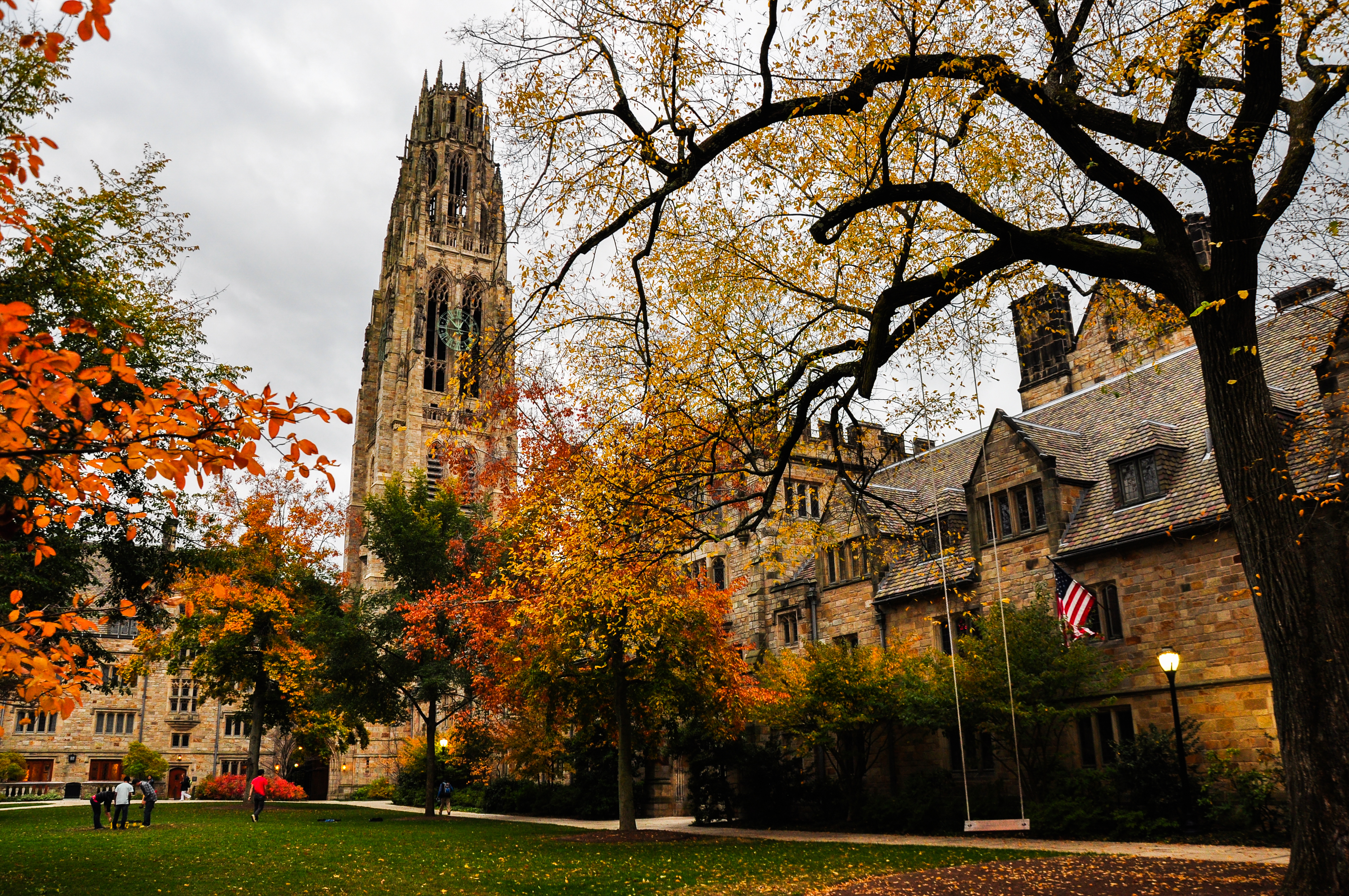
Branford College courtyard with Harkness Tower in the background.

Branford is the sister college of Quincy House at Harvard, Pembroke College at Oxford and Christ's College at Cambridge. It is tradition for Branfordians to host members of Quincy House when Yale hosts Harvard during The Game.

== Facilities ==
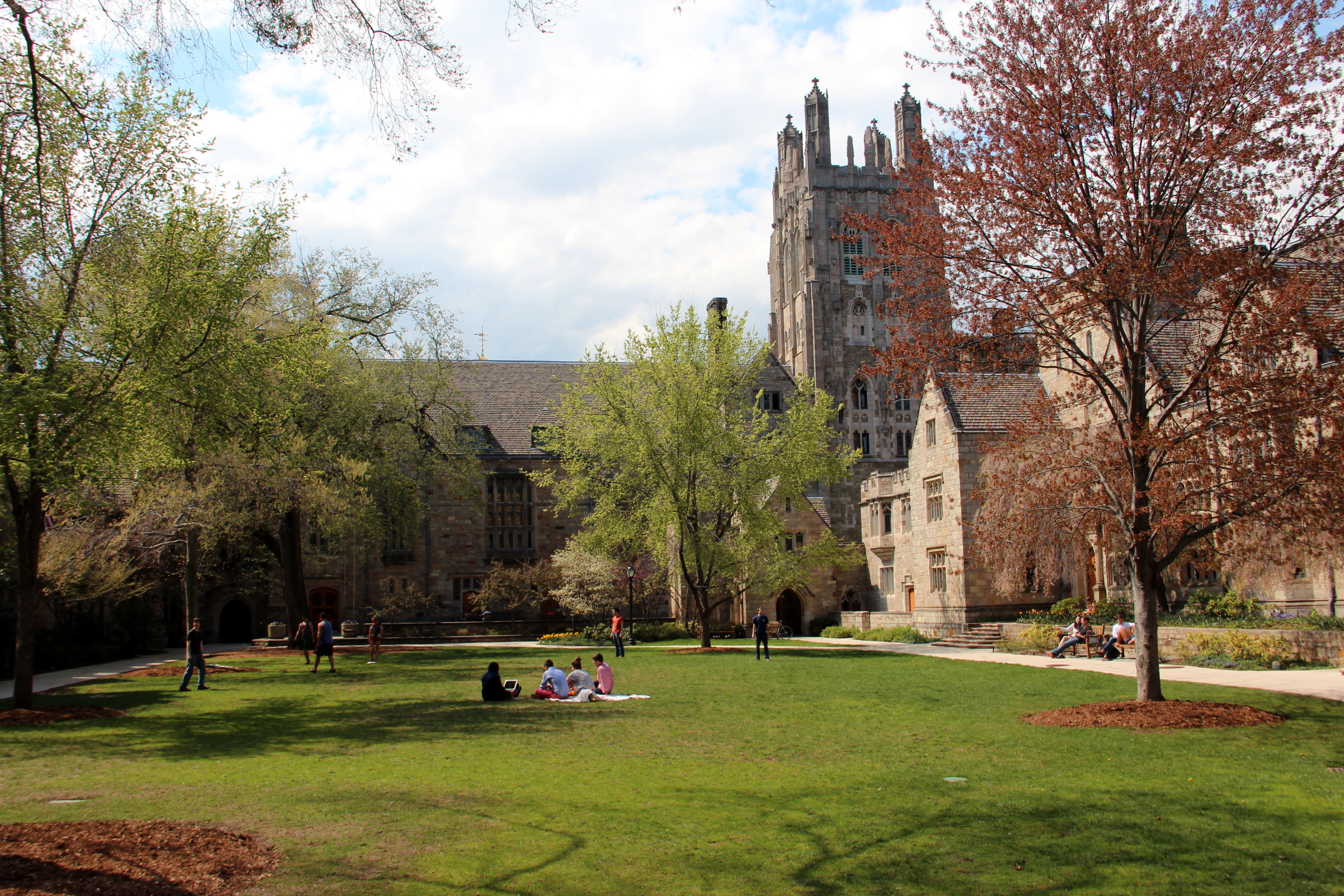
Branford Court towards Wrexham Tower, spring

There are two "common rooms" in addition to the primary common room (located underneath the Dining Hall). Located between Linonia and Branford Courts is the Fellows' Lounge, where the Fellows of the College meet. This room is called the Trumbull Room, in memory of the first art gallery at Yale, which was built to house the paintings of John Trumbull.

The Branford Dining Hall is located above the common room parallel to York Street. The large, vaulted main dining hall contains a 15th-century Burgundian fireplace. A smaller, cozier room traditionally called The Pit, also known as the Small Dining Hall, is frequently reserved by student groups for dinner meetings.

The other "Common Room" is the Mendell Room, named for Branford's first master, Clarence Whittlesey Mendell. Confusingly, this room also had several other names. It was originally dubbed the "Cabinet Commons" when it was constructed. It quickly came to be known as the "Ship Room" after the carving over the mantle, which depicts the phantom "Great Ship" lost at sea off the coast of New Haven. During the early days of the College, it was used as a "Music Room," and a record player was installed for the use of College students. It was only after the death of Master Mendell that the room was renamed in his honor. The room, which is located between the Branford and Brothers in Unity Courts (joined by the Jared Eliot gateway) is used for seminars and meetings of small student organizations.

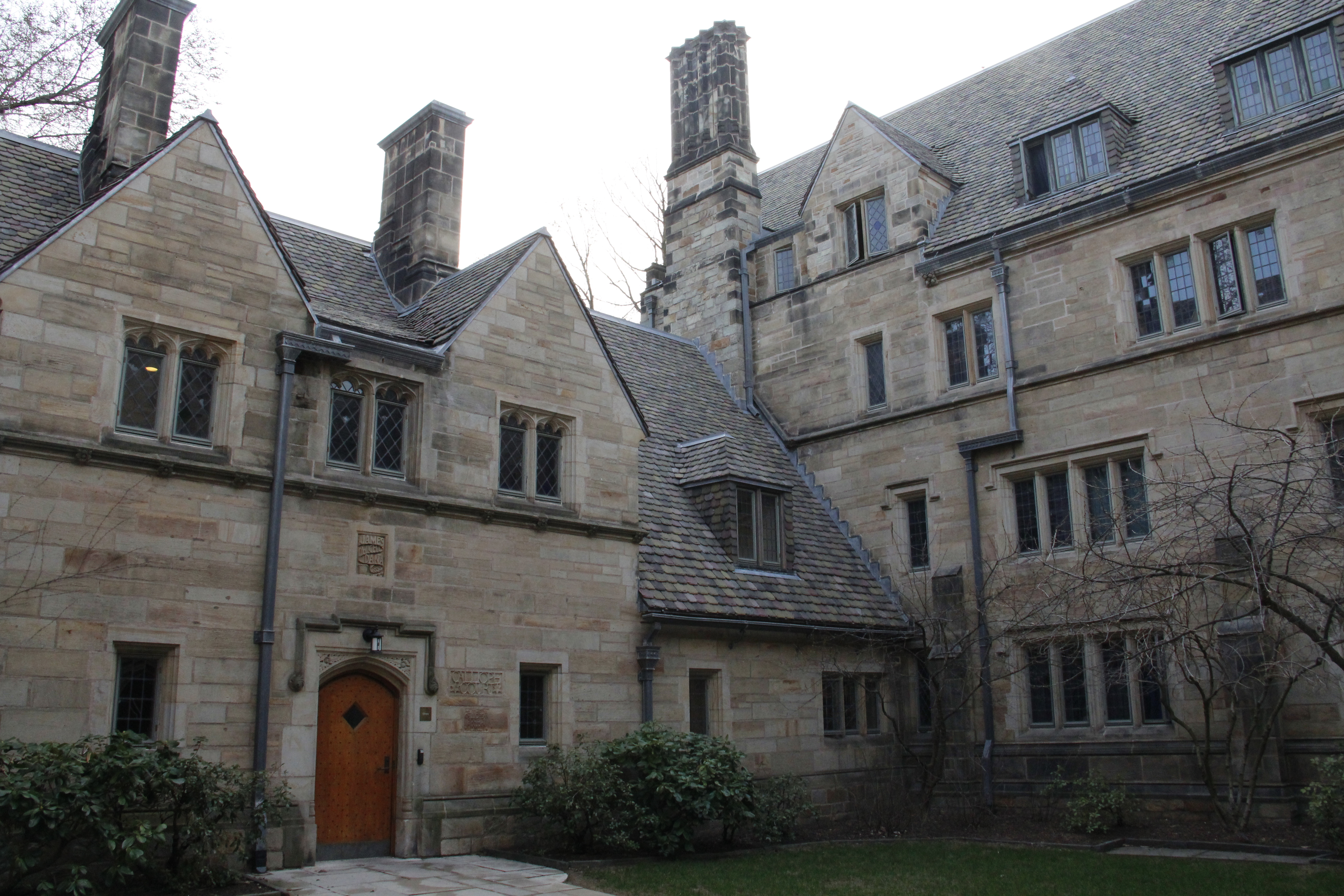
Calliope Court

The Branford College Library is located in the middle courtyard of Branford College, named Calliope Court. The student rooms and common areas are decorated with stained glass by G. Owen Bonawit. Branford's architect, James Gamble Rogers, required that at least one pane on every window be broken and then soldered back together, resulting in a Y-shape in many of the windows.

The student-led committee, Branford College Council (BCC), coordinates events around Branford College.

The basement of the College houses the College's student-run buttery, a computer cluster, a small weight room, two squash courts, a dance studio, a basketball court, a digital media center, a game room, a student kitchen, a pottery studio, a printing press, and laundry facilities. The basement was remodeled just more than a decade ago, with the rest of the college. First-year Branfordians live in entryways A through C of Vanderbilt Hall on Old Campus and share the building with the first-year students of Saybrook College, who live in entryways D through F of the same building. The college was renovated in 2000 as part of the University's renovation of all the residential colleges.

== Heads and Deans ==
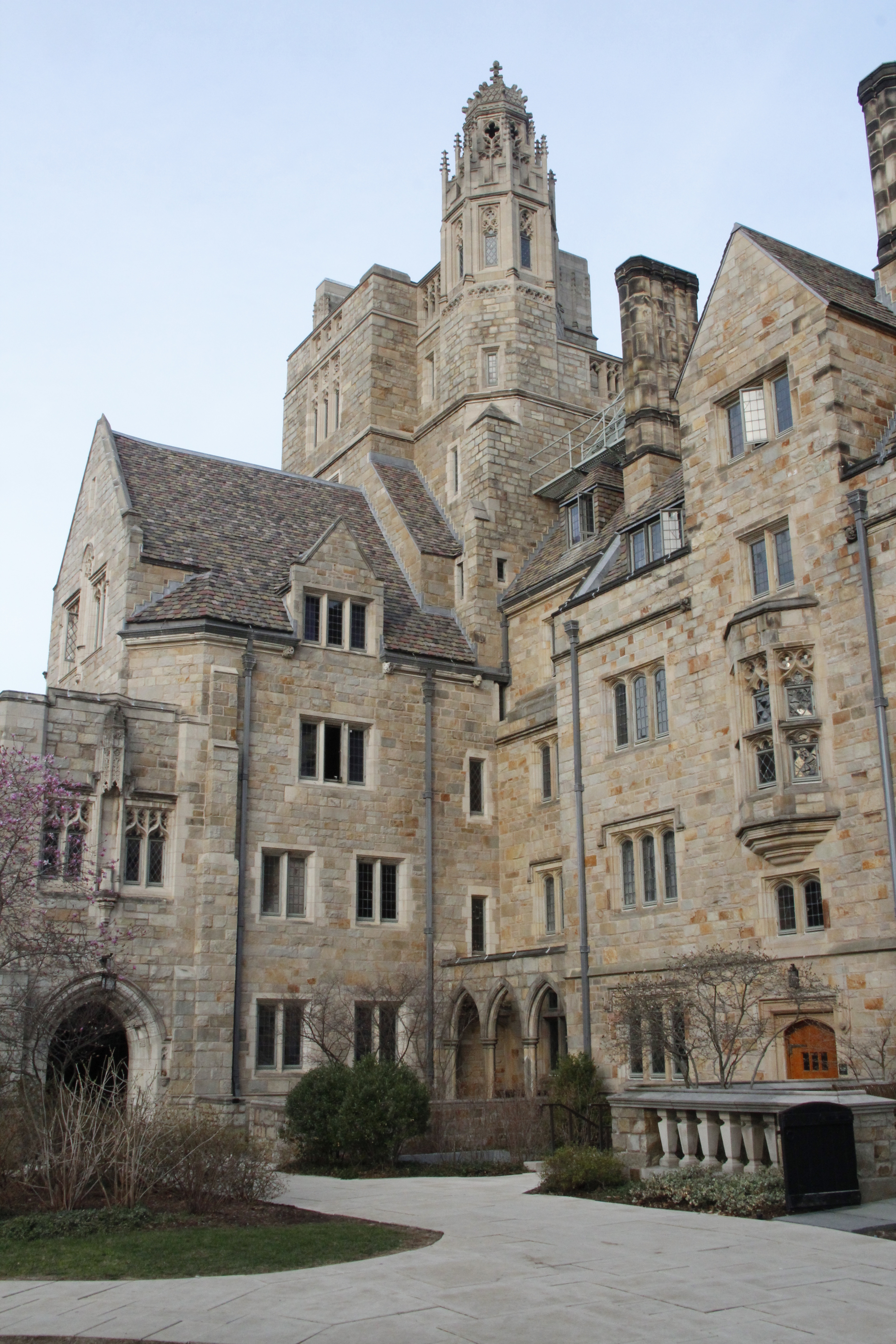
East end of Branford Court

Heads of Branford College	Term
Clarence Whittlesey Mendell	1931–1942
Norman Sydney Buck	1942–1959
George Alfred Schrader, Jr	1959–1966
John Philip Trinkaus	1966–1973
William Zinsser	1973–1979
Phyllis Curtin	1979–1983
John M. Merriman	1983–1991
Worth David	1991–1996
Steven B. Smith	1996–2011
Elizabeth H. Bradley	2011–2017
Enrique M. De La Cruz	2017–present

Deans of Branford College	Term
Richard Ralph Shank	1963–1964
Michael Heath Cowan	1964–1966
Thomas Kennedy Edwards	1966–1969
Barry Lydgate	1969–1973
Carlos Hortas	1973–1975
Lorenzo Simpson	1975–1976
Margarita Egan	1976–1983
Marion F. Freeman	1980–1981 (Acting Dean)
Rory Browne	1983–1990
Mark Schenker	1990–1996
Nicole Parisier	1996–2003
Thomas F. McDow	2003–2007
Daniel Tauss	2007–2010
Hilary Fink	2010–2015
Sarah E. Insley	2015–2022
Maria del Mar Galindo	2022–2026 I- I Amanda Klay 2026-present

In 2016, the title of "Master" was changed to "Head of College"

== Notable alumni ==
- John Ashcroft, 1964 – 79th United States Attorney General and Missouri Governor and Senator.
- Scott Bessent, 1984 – 79th United States Secretary of the Treasury.
- Richard H. Brodhead, 1968 – 9th President of Duke University and former Dean of Yale College.
- Bruce Donald, 1980 – computational biologist and drug designer, James B. Duke Professor of Computer Science and Biochemistry at Duke University.
- Reuben Jeffery III, 1975 – Former Chairman of the Commodity Futures Trading Commission.
- Arthur Laffer, 1963 – economist, known for the Laffer curve.
- Liz Magill, 1988 – 9th President of the University of Pennsylvania
- Ann Olivarius, 1977 – feminist attorney.
- Meghan O'Rourke, 1997 – poet and staff writer for The New Yorker
- James Rothman, 1971 – cell biologist 2013 Nobel Prize in Medicine laureate.
- Sarah Sze, 1991 – contemporary artist and United States Representative for the 55th Venice Biennale.
- Lauren Willig, 1999 – author.
- Edward Wyckoff Williams, 1998 – journalist and author.

=== Fictional ===
- Rory Gilmore from Gilmore Girls
- Richard Gilmore from Gilmore Girls
- Paris Geller from Gilmore Girls
