= Yale Memorial Carillon =

Bell instrument in New Haven, Connecticut, US

Coordinates: 41.3093°N 72.9294°W

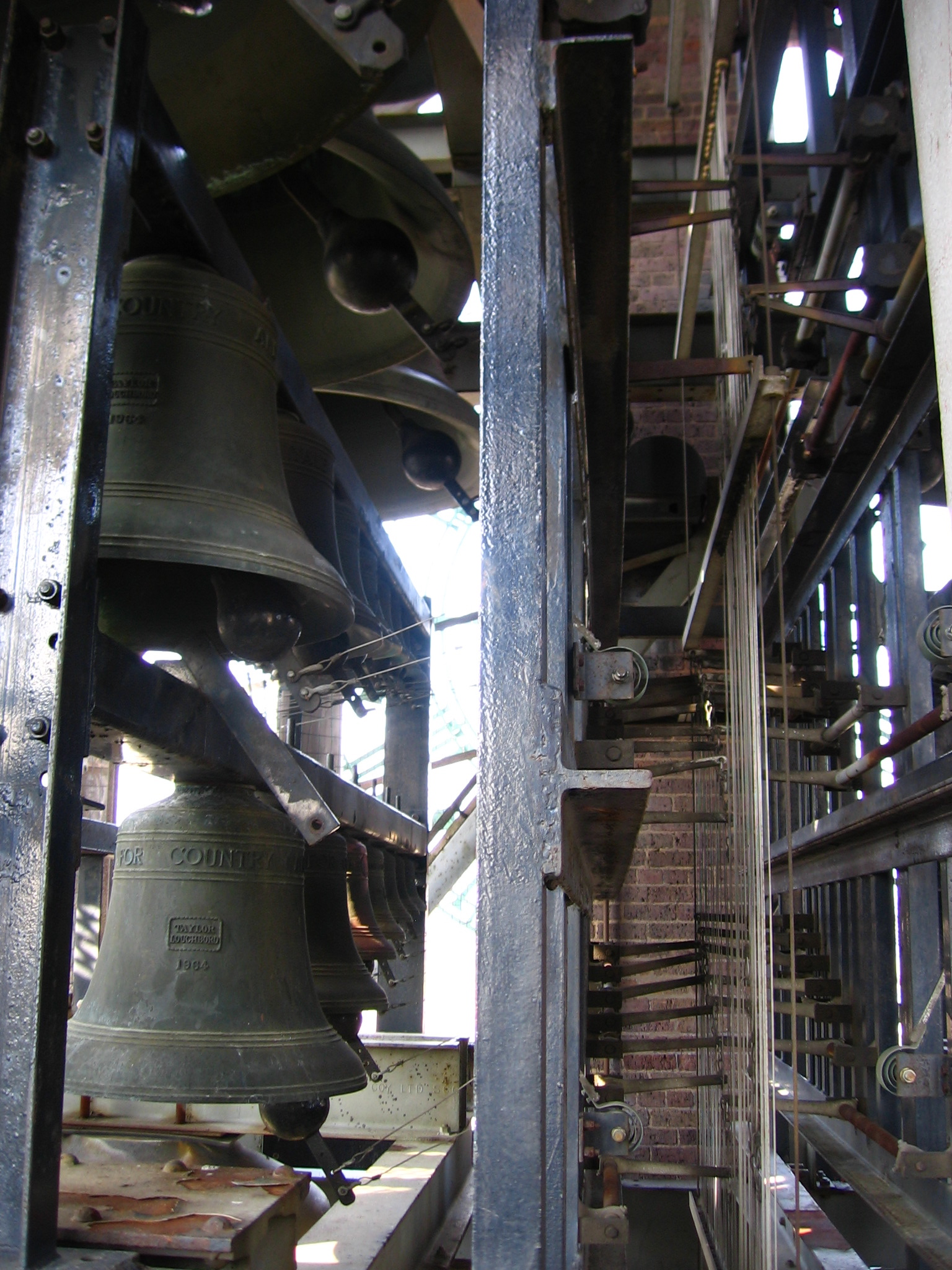
The bells of the Yale Memorial Carillon. Wires connect the clappers to the console below.

The Yale Memorial Carillon (sometimes incorrectly referred to as the Harkness Carillon) is a carillon of 54 bells in Harkness Tower at Yale University in New Haven, Connecticut.

This carillon is a transposing instrument pitched in B. Its 54 bells are chromatically arranged from G (1.5 octaves below middle-C) to C (3 octaves above middle-C) for a total of 4.5 octaves. The lowest bell is an F♯ concert pitch, and weighs 13,400 pounds. Each bell is engraved with the year it was cast, the seal of the foundry, the seal of Yale, and the motto "For God, For Country, and For Yale."

== Origin ==
Harkness Tower, the Memorial Quadrangle that surrounds it, and the Harkness Memorial Chime were all part of a gift to Yale made by Anna M. Harkness in memory of her son, Charles William Harkness. Its original 10 bells (an instrument with a range of less than two octaves is referred to as a chime - the Harkness Memorial Chime - rather than a carillon) were cast by the John Taylor Bellfounders of Loughborough, England, in 1921. They were installed in Harkness Tower in 1922 and were first rung by John Taylor on June 9, 1922. The chimes were rung regularly by the university organist, Samuel H. Smith, until 1946 when this duty was assumed by a student, Elliot H. Kone '49. On his graduation in 1949, Kone formed a student organization, the Guild of Yale Bellringers, to continue with four rings per day.

== Expansion ==
In 1966, the instrument was expanded by the installation of an additional 44 bells, made possible by a gift from Florence S. Marcy Crofut and also cast by the John Taylor Bellfounders. The original chime had 10 pitches, which were named in concert pitch (F♯-G-A-B-C-C♯-D-E-F♯-G); the expansion kept the same bell as bourdon, but the notes were renamed to make the bourdon a G (it is common practice to make carillons transposing instruments so that composers can assume a standard range). The new fully chromatic 4.5 octave carillon was named the Yale Memorial Carillon to avoid showing preference to either the Harkness or the Crofut gift. At this point the Guild renamed itself the Yale University Guild of Carillonneurs.

Before the additional bells arrived, a practice carillon was installed in the tower to allow Guild members to learn the new instrument ahead of time. The practice carillon has a keyboard and pedalboard identical to those of the carillon, but the keys strike small tone bars instead of full-sized bells. The practice carillon allows Guild members to practice at a volume comparable to that of most other instruments instead of at the full volume of the carillon, which can be heard for several blocks. A second practice carillon was installed in April, 2006, adding greater flexibility to practicing schedules.

Yale tour guides like to perpetuate the myth that Harkness Tower was once the tallest free-standing stone structure in the world, but needed to be reinforced because an eccentric architect poured acid down the walls to make the tower look older. However, the Washington Monument has been the tallest free-standing stone structure in the United States since it was completed, long before Harkness Tower was built. Furthermore, it was the weight of the additional bells in 1966 that necessitated the reinforcement of the tower with a steel frame structure to carry the additional weight.

== Current use ==
The instrument is currently rung by members of the Yale University Guild of Carillonneurs twice a day when classes are in session, and in the evening during the summer. The Guild is a group of approximately twenty undergraduate and graduate students. From September to May, rings occur at 12:30 p.m. and 5:30 p.m. During the summer, the Guild hosts a concert series of guest carillonneurs on Friday evenings. Free tours are led by students throughout the year and can be arranged using the Guild's website.

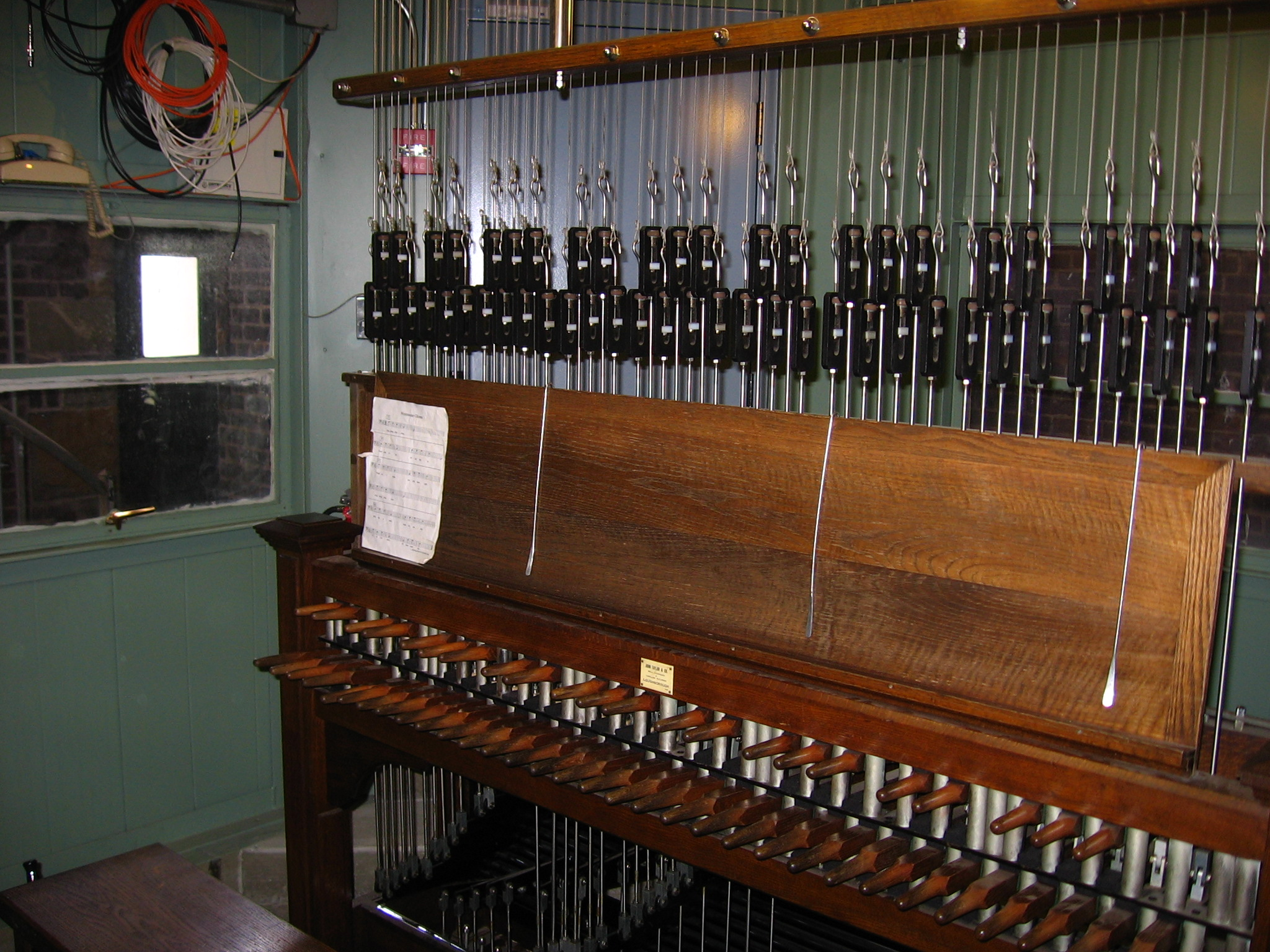
The carillon console. Guild members strike the batons with their hand and the pedals with their feet to move the clappers of the bells.

Every fall semester, all students from Yale College and the Yale Graduate Schools are invited to learn to play the carillon and can audition for a place in the Yale University Guild of Carillonneurs. These students undergo an intensive five-week training program led by experienced members of the guild concluding with an audition. The most skilled students are admitted to the group, and perform regularly on the carillon.

== See also ==
- List of carillons in the United States
