= Paul Hudak =

American computer scientist

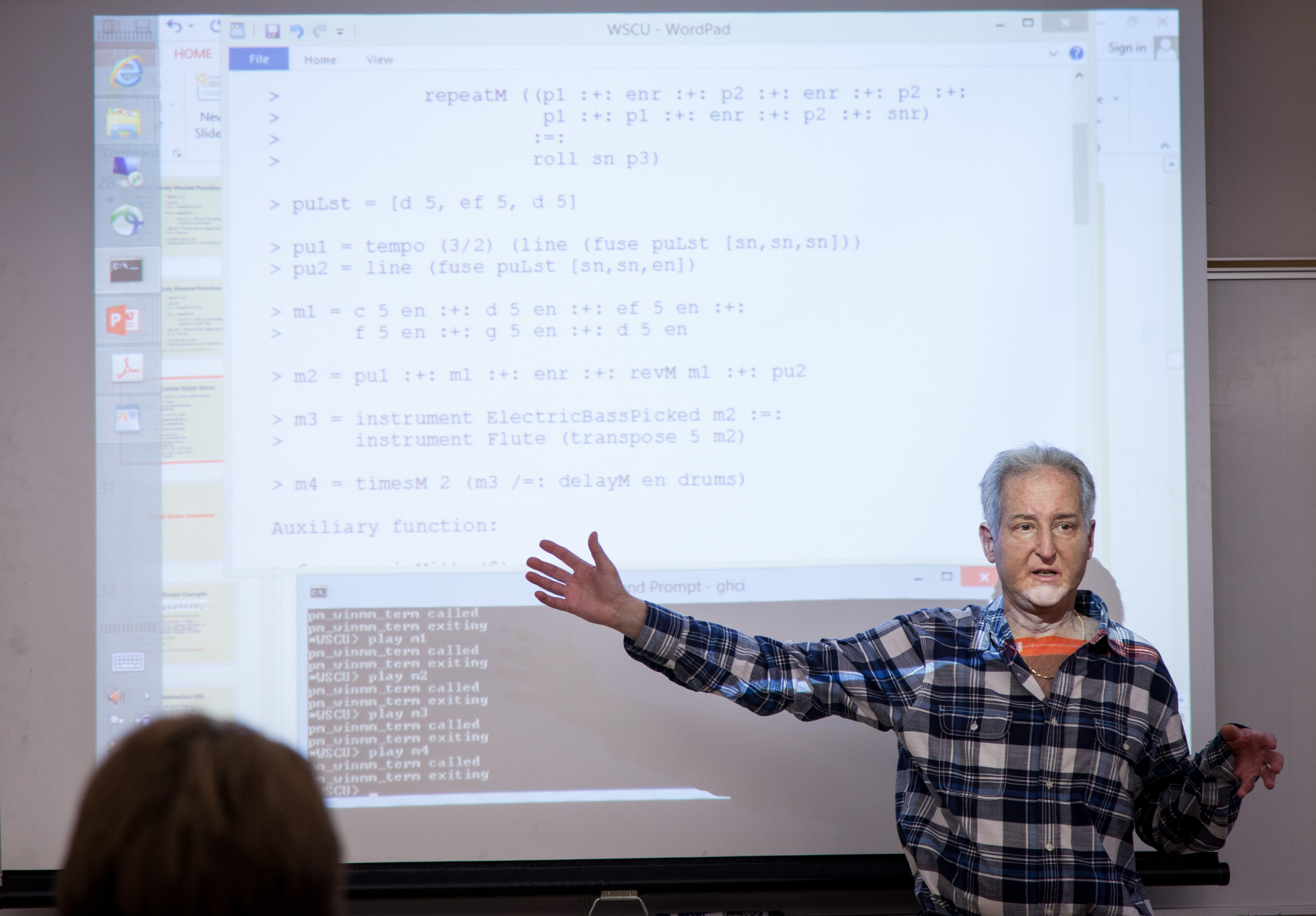
- Paul Hudak in 2013
- Born: Paul Raymond Hudak; July 15, 1952; Baltimore, Maryland, United States
- Died: April 29, 2015 (aged 62); New Haven, Connecticut
- Resting place: Grove Street Cemetery
- Education: Vanderbilt University (B.S., 1973); Massachusetts Institute of Technology (M.S., 1974); University of Utah (Ph.D., 1982)
- Occupation: Computer scientist
- Known for: co-designing the programming language Haskell
- Spouse: Cathy Van Dyke
- Children: Jen Hudak; Cristina Hudak-Rosander
- Awards: University of Utah Research Fellow (1981-82); IBM Faculty Development Award (1984); Presidential Young Investigator Award (1985); ACM Fellow (2003); ACM SIGPLAN Most Influential ICFP Paper Award (2007); ACM SIGOPS Hall of Fame Award (2012)
- Scientific career
- Fields: Computer science
- Institutions: Watkins-Johnson Company; Yale University
- Thesis: Object and Task Reclamation in Distributed Applicative Processing Systems (1982)
- Doctoral advisor: Robert M. Keller
- Doctoral students: Kai Li; Sheng Liang
- Other notable students: Martin Odersky
- Website: web.archive.org/web/20140722064822/http://haskell.cs.yale.edu/people/paul-hudak/

Paul Raymond Hudak (July 15, 1952 – April 29, 2015) was an American musician and professor of computer science at Yale University who was best known for his involvement in the design of the programming language Haskell, and for several textbooks on Haskell and computer music. He was a chair of the department, and was also master of Saybrook College. He died on April 29, 2015, of leukemia.
