= Lamon V. Harkness =

American businessman

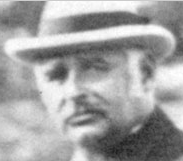
- Born: Lamon Vanderburgh Harkness; January 6, 1850; Bellevue, Ohio, U.S.
- Died: January 17, 1915 (aged 65); Paicines, California, U.S.
- Occupation: Businessman
- Spouse: Martha Frances Johnson
- Children: 3, including Harry
- Parent(s): Stephen V. Harkness; Laura Osborne Harkness

Lamon Vanderburgh Harkness (January 6, 1850 – January 17, 1915) was an American businessman and one of the largest stockholders in Standard Oil. Lamon V. Harkness became involved with Standard Oil through his father Stephen V. Harkness, who was a primary silent investor in the formation of Standard Oil.

== Early life ==
Harkness was born in Bellevue, Ohio on January 6, 1850. He was the son of Stephen Vanderburgh Harkness (1818–1888) and his first wife, Laura (née Osborne) Harkness (1815–1852). Lamon's mother Laura died in 1852 when Lamon was 2 years old. His father Stephen was remarried to Anna M. Harkness (née Richardson) in 1854. The Harknesses moved to Monroeville, Ohio around 1860, and in 1865 they moved from Monroeville to Willoughby, Ohio outside of Cleveland. Stephen and Anna had two children, Charles W. Harkness, born 1860 in Monroeville, and Edward Harkness, born 1874 in Cleveland. The age difference between Lamon and Charles was 10 years and between Lamon and Edward was 24 years.

== Career ==
At the age of 16, Lamon bought a ranch outside of Eureka, Kansas. He entered the cattle business at the age of 19. About this same time, Lamon's father made an investment with John D. Rockefeller to start Standard Oil. This investment would soon change the lives of the whole Harkness family.

After Standard Oil started on its way, Lamon moved to Kansas City, Missouri where he dabbled in the banking business.

Standard Oil grew to become a behemoth and a huge success. However, in 1888, when Lamon was 38, his father Stephen died at the age of 69. After his father's death, Lamon decided to come back east and settle in Greenwich, Connecticut where he bought the William Avery Rockefeller mansion in 1891. The mansion was situated on 34 acres and had 22 bedrooms.

=== Horse breeding ===
Following a trip to Kentucky in 1892, Lamon acquired a 400-acre (1.6 km^{2}) farm in Donerail, Kentucky named Walnut Hall Farm. There he developed a Standardbred horse breeding operation of major importance to the harness racing industry. In 1904, Walnut Hall had expanded to 2,000 acres and 100 mares. The farm became one of the best-known Standardbred farms in the world. The farm's Big Barn built by Harkness in 1897 is 476 feet long, and has 52 stalls, a sales area and auctioneer's block – and it was still in service more than 100 years later at the Kentucky Horse Park. When Harkness died in 1915, the then-5,000-acre farm with 1400 horses was passed to his heirs. Although sub-divided several times, a part of which is now home to the Kentucky Horse Park, Walnut Farm remains in the hands of his descendants.

In recognition of his contribution to the industry, in 1958 Lamon Harkness was inducted posthumously in the Harness Racing Hall of Fame.

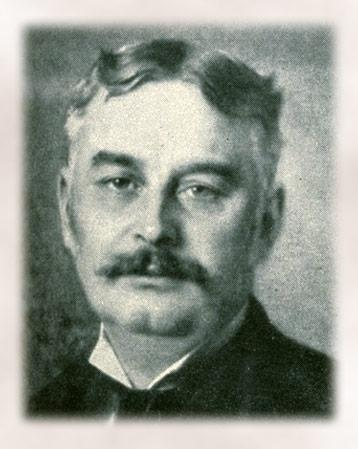

=== Yachting ===
Harkness was well known as a yachtsman who owned the SS Wakiva which became part of the United States Navy during 1917 and 1918 and had war service during World War I.

He was a member of The New York Athletic Club, Columbia Yacht Club, The New York Yacht Club and Greenwich Indian Harbor Yacht Club.

== Personal life ==
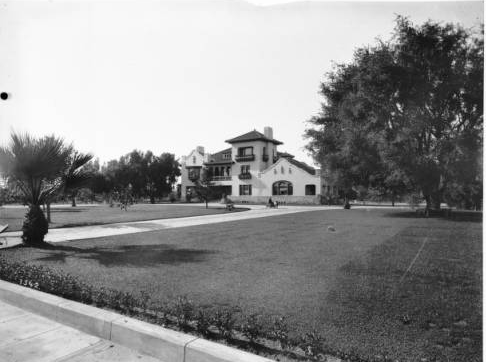
W. C. Stuart Residence and Later L.V. Harkness residence in Pasadena, CA

Harkness was married to Martha Frances Johnson (1853–1905). In addition to the home at Walnut Hall Farm, Lamon Harkness owned several homes including a mansion at 933 Fifth Avenue in New York City, and a home in East Hampton (town), New York. Harkness had two daughters and a son:

- Lela Harkness (1873–1946), who married Ogden M. Edwards (1869–1940).
- Harry Stephen Harkness (1880–1919), who married Marie M. Marbeck in 1906. They divorced in 1916 and he remarried that same year to Florence Streuber (1882–1945), the former wife of David Huyler Gaines. After his death at age thirty-eight, she married Robert Whitslar Schuette.
- Myrtle Harkness (1883–1962), who married California businessman A. Kingsley Macomber (1877–1955), a major Thoroughbred racehorse owner and breeder, in 1899. After his death she married Pasha Ilhamy Hussein (1908–1992) in 1960.

Harkness died in 1915 at his daughter's ranch, Rancho Cienega de los Paicines in San Benito County, California, leaving an estate of approximately $100 million ($2.3 billion in 2025 dollars). Predeceased by his wife, they are buried together in Woodlawn Cemetery in The Bronx, New York.

=== Tax suit ===
With multiple residences including New York City as well as Kentucky, California and Connecticut, the question of where inheritance taxes should be paid came into play upon L.V.'s death. The case went to the State Supreme Court and The Harkness Estate was successful in defending the assertion that he was not a resident of New York upon his death.
