= Anna M. Harkness =

American philanthropist

- Born: October 25, 1837; Dalton, Ohio, U.S.
- Died: March 27, 1926 (aged 88); New York City, New York, U.S.
- Resting place: Lake View Cemetery
- Occupation: Philanthropist
- Spouse: Stephen V. Harkness (m. 1854; died 1888)
- Children: Jennie Harkness; Charles W. Harkness; Florence Harkness; Edward Harkness

Anna Maria Richardson Harkness (October 25, 1837 – March 27, 1926) was an American philanthropist.

== Early life ==
Harkness was born on October 25, 1837, in Dalton, Ohio, and was the daughter of James Richardson and Anna (née Ranck) Richardson. Not much is known about her early life.

== Married life ==
On February 13, 1854, then sixteen-year-old Anna was married to the 34-year-old Stephen Vanderburgh Harkness, an early investor with John D. Rockefeller who became the second-largest shareholder in Standard Oil before his death in March 1888. Stephen had previously been married to Laura Osborne, who died in August 1852, and with whom he had three children, only one of whom, Lamon V. Harkness, was living at the time of their marriage. Together, Anna and Stephen lived at his estate on Euclid Avenue in Cleveland (known as Millionaires' Row) and were the parents of four more children, three of whom survived to adulthood:

- Jennie A. Harkness (1856–1864), who died young.
- Charles William Harkness (1860–1916), who married Mary Warden (1864–1916) in 1896; both died of influenza in 1916.
- Florence Harkness (1864–1895), who married the widower Louis Henry Severance (1838–1913).
- Edward Stephen Harkness (1874–1940), who married Mary Stillman, daughter of New York attorney Thomas Edgar Stillman, in 1904.

Her husband died aboard his yacht on March 6, 1888, and was buried in Cleveland's Lake View Cemetery. He left an estate valued at $150 million (equivalent to $4.7 billion in 2025) and Anna inherited one-third of his fortune, consisting primarily of stock in Standard Oil.

In 1891, Anna moved to New York City, but continued to maintain a home in Willoughby, Ohio. She died on March 27, 1926, at her home, 820 Fifth Avenue in New York City. After a private funeral, she was buried alongside her late husband in Lake View Cemetery. At her death, she had already given away $40 million, yet her $50 million dollar inheritance had increased to nearly $85 million (equivalent to $1.24 billion in 2025). Accounting for inflation, it was nonetheless less than the $1.5 billion equivalent she had inherited.

=== Philanthropy ===
Their first child, Jennie, died aged seven in 1864. After her death, the Harknesses erected and furnished a memorial pavilion at Lakeside Hospital in Cleveland as a memorial to her. On July 29, 1895, within a year of Florence's marriage to Louis Severance, the former Treasurer of Standard Oil, their second daughter also died. Similarly, Anna and her son-in-law Louis donated the funds for the construction of the Florence Harkness Memorial Chapel at Case Western Reserve University in Cleveland.

After her eldest son Charles died in 1916, Anna gave $3 million (equivalent to $50 million in 2025) to Yale University for the construction of Memorial Quadrangle in Charles's memory, including Harkness Tower, the most visible symbol of Yale on the New Haven skyline. Anna's portrait by Albert Herter is displayed in the dining hall of Saybrook College, part of the Memorial Quadrangle. In 1920, she donated an additional $3 million to Yale towards increases in faculty salaries.

In October 1918, Anna established the Commonwealth Fund, a foundation dedicated to the improvement of healthcare with an initial gift of $10 million (equivalent to $142 million in 2025). Along with her son, Edward, the foundation made charitable gifts totaling more than $129 million, the equivalent of $2 billion in 2005 dollars, including funds for the establishment of the Harkness Fellowships, the construction of St. Salvator's Hall at the University of St Andrews, the Butler Library at Columbia University, and many of the undergraduate dormitories at Harvard and Yale Universities (known as "houses" and "residential colleges," respectively). The fund was also a major benefactor of the Hampton and Tuskegee Institutes, the Museum of Natural History in New York, the New York Zoological Society and Columbia University College of Physicians and Surgeons, the New York Public Library and the Metropolitan Museum of Art, where it established the Museum's collection of ancient Egyptian art. The Harkness Pavilion at NewYork–Presbyterian Hospital / Columbia University Medical Center is also named for the family.
