= Harkness Tower =

Masonry tower at Yale University

Coordinates: 41.3093°N 72.9294°W

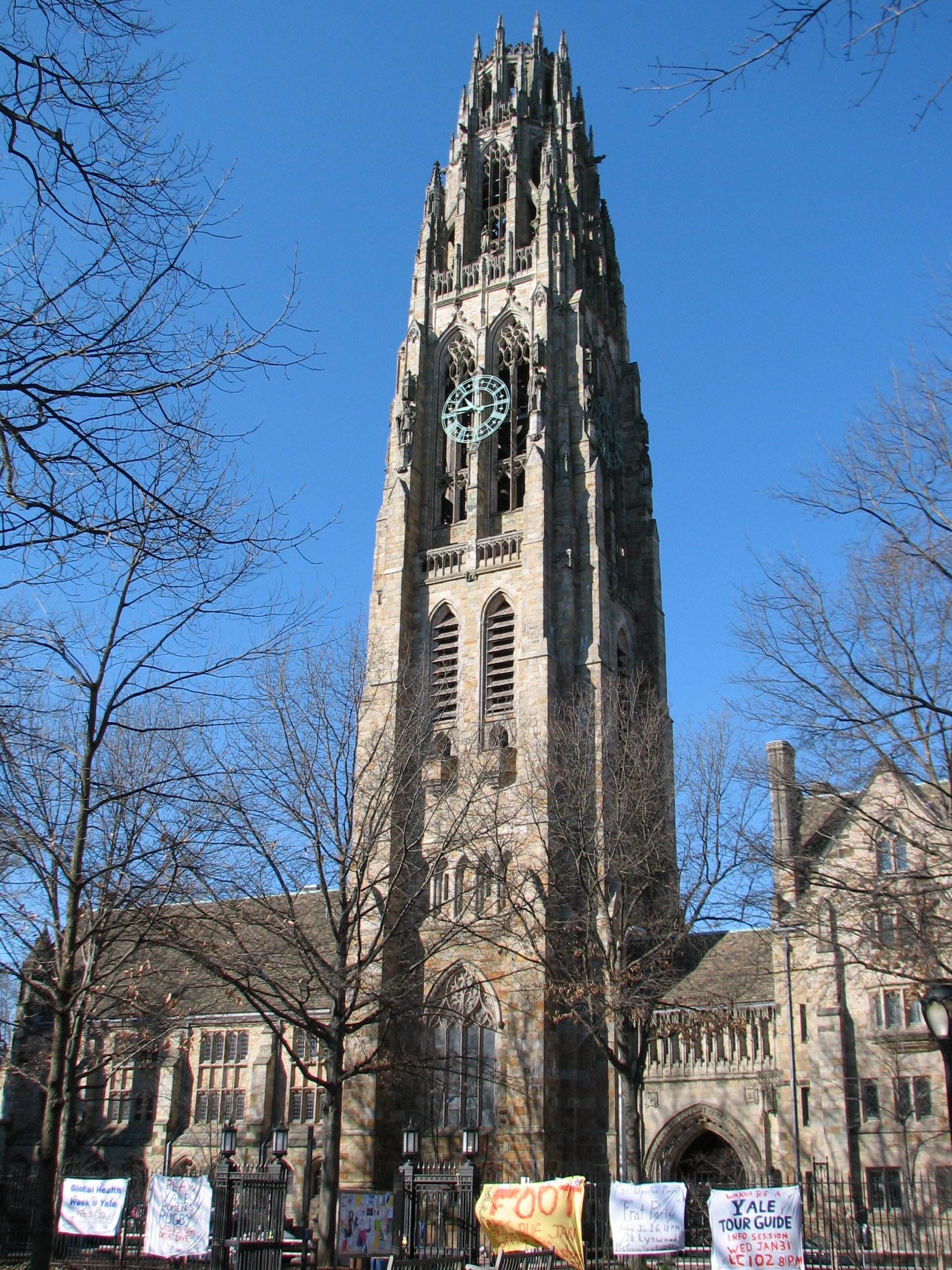
- Interactive map of the Harkness Tower area

General information
- Architectural style: Collegiate Gothic
- Location: New Haven, Connecticut
- Construction started: 1917
- Completed: 1921
- Owner: Yale University

Height
- Height: 216 ft. (66 m)

Technical details
- Floor count: 9

Design and construction
- Architect: James Gamble Rogers
- Other designers: Lee Lawrie, sculptor

Harkness Tower is an architectural tower at Yale University in New Haven, Connecticut. Part of the Collegiate Gothic Memorial Quadrangle complex completed in 1922, it is named for Charles William Harkness, brother of Yale's largest benefactor, Edward Harkness.

== History ==
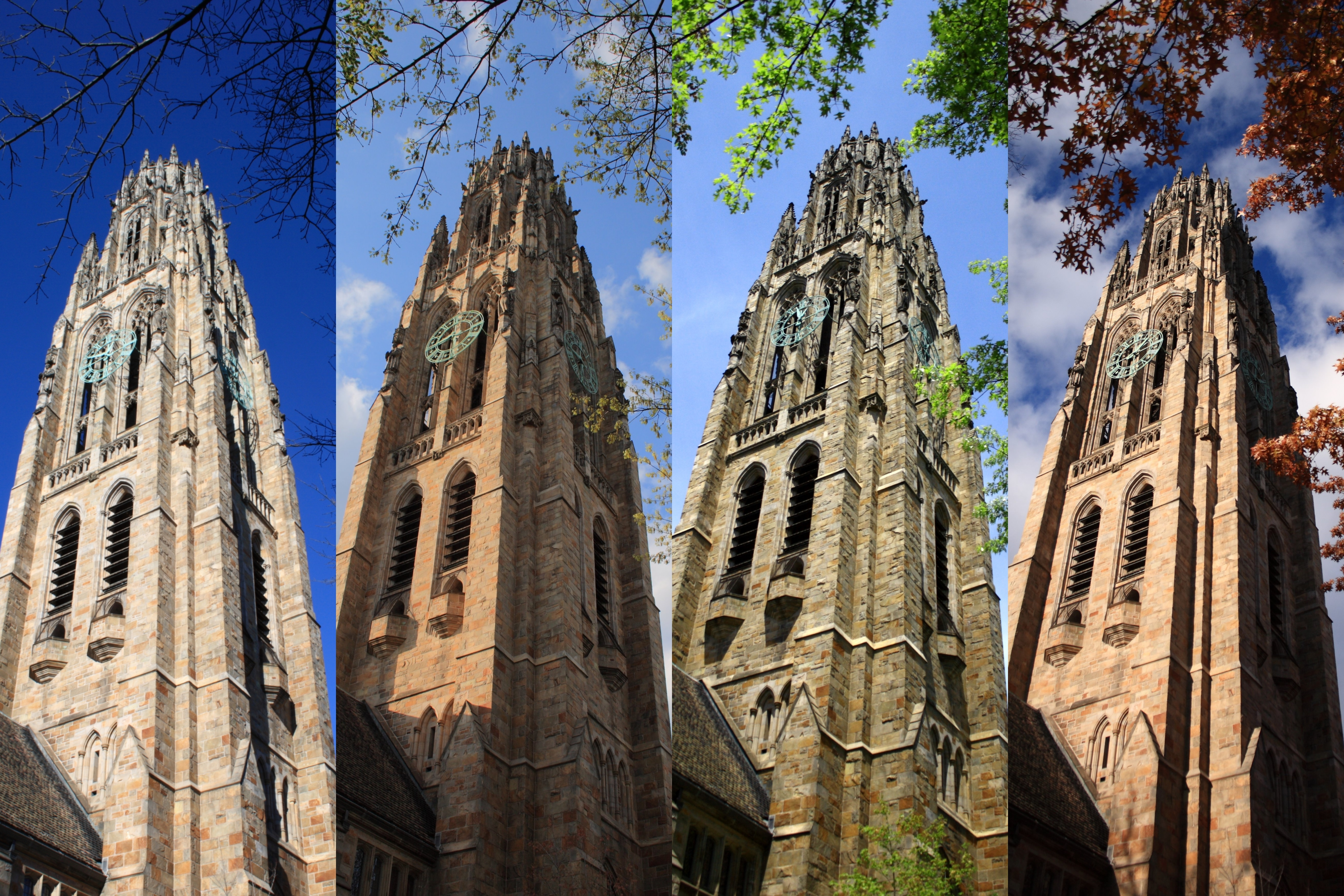
Harkness Tower over the course of a year

The masonry tower was constructed between 1917 and 1921 as part of the Memorial Quadrangle donated to Yale by Anna M. Harkness in honor of her recently deceased son, Charles William Harkness, an 1883 Yale graduate. When the residential college system was inaugurated in 1933, the tower became part of Branford College.

It was designed by James Gamble Rogers, a Yale College classmate of Anna Harkness's other son, Edward S. Harkness. James S. Hedden was the contractor's supervisor for the project and took many photographs of the construction's progress.

The tower underwent renovations from September 2009 to May 2010 to repair its masonry and ornament.

== Influence ==
Harkness Tower was the first couronne ("crown") tower in English Perpendicular Gothic style built in the modern era. James Gamble Rogers, who designed the tower and many of Yale's Collegiate Gothic structures, said it was inspired by the 15th-century Boston Stump, the 272-foot (83 m) tower of the parish church of St Botolph in Boston, Lincolnshire and tallest parish church tower in England. Rogers also based some details on the 16th-century tower of St Giles' Church in Wrexham, Wales, where Elihu Yale is buried. In turn, Harkness Tower has been identified as the direct influence for the tower of the Cathedral of Christ the King in Hamilton, Ontario.

The tower's image was adopted by the Yale Herald, a weekly student newspaper, for its masthead.

== Design ==
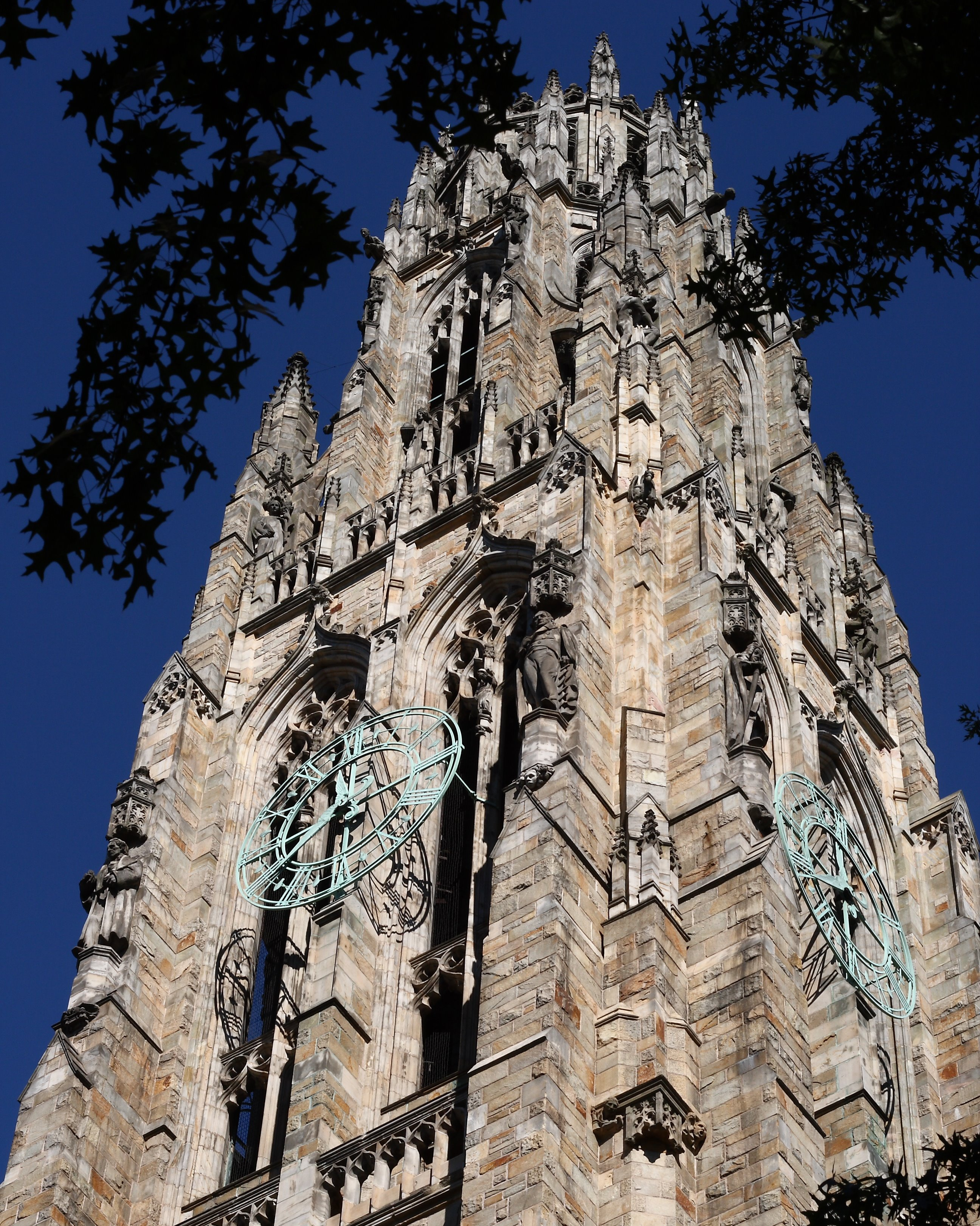
The bronze clock faces on the Tower

Harkness Tower is 216 feet (66 m) tall, one foot for each year since Yale's founding at the time it was built. From a square base, it rises in stages to a double stone crown on an octagonal base, and at the top are stone finials. From the street level to the roof, there are 284 steps.

Midway to the top, four openwork copper clockfaces tell the hours. The bells of the carillon are behind the clockfaces, fixed to a frame made of steel I-beams. The playing console of the carillon is at the level of the balconies immediately below the clock faces. Lower levels of the tower house a water tank (no longer used), two practice carillons, the old chimes playing console, office space for the Yale University Guild of Carillonneurs, and a memorial chapel.

=== Materials ===
The tower was built of separate stone blocks, and reinforced with steel in 1966 to handle the new bells in the carillon.

Yale tour guides frequently mention the legend that the tower was the world's tallest free-standing stone structure until it required reinforcement after an eccentric architect or philanthropist ordered acid to be poured down the walls to make it look older. In reality, the Washington Monument was the country's tallest such structure long before Harkness Tower was built.

=== Ornamentation ===
The tower's decorative elements were sculpted by Lee Lawrie. The lowest level of sculpture depicts Yale's Eight Worthies: Elihu Yale, Jonathan Edwards, Nathan Hale, Noah Webster, James Fenimore Cooper, John C. Calhoun, Samuel F. B. Morse, and Eli Whitney. The second level of sculpture depicts Phidias, Homer, Aristotle, and Euclid. The next level of sculpture consists of allegorical figures depicting Medicine, Business, Law, the Church, Courage and Effort, War and Peace, Generosity and Order, Justice and Truth, Life and Progress, and Death and Freedom. The gargoyles on the top level depict Yale's students at war and in study (a pen-wielding writer, a proficient athlete, a tea-drinking socialite, and a diligent scholar), along with masks of Homer, Virgil, Dante, and Shakespeare.

== Reception ==
The witticism, attributed to various modernist architects, that had they to choose any place in New Haven to live s/he would select the Harkness Tower, for then they "would not have to look at it," is apparently apocryphal, derivative of a similar story told of Guy de Maupassant and the Eiffel Tower.

== Carillon ==
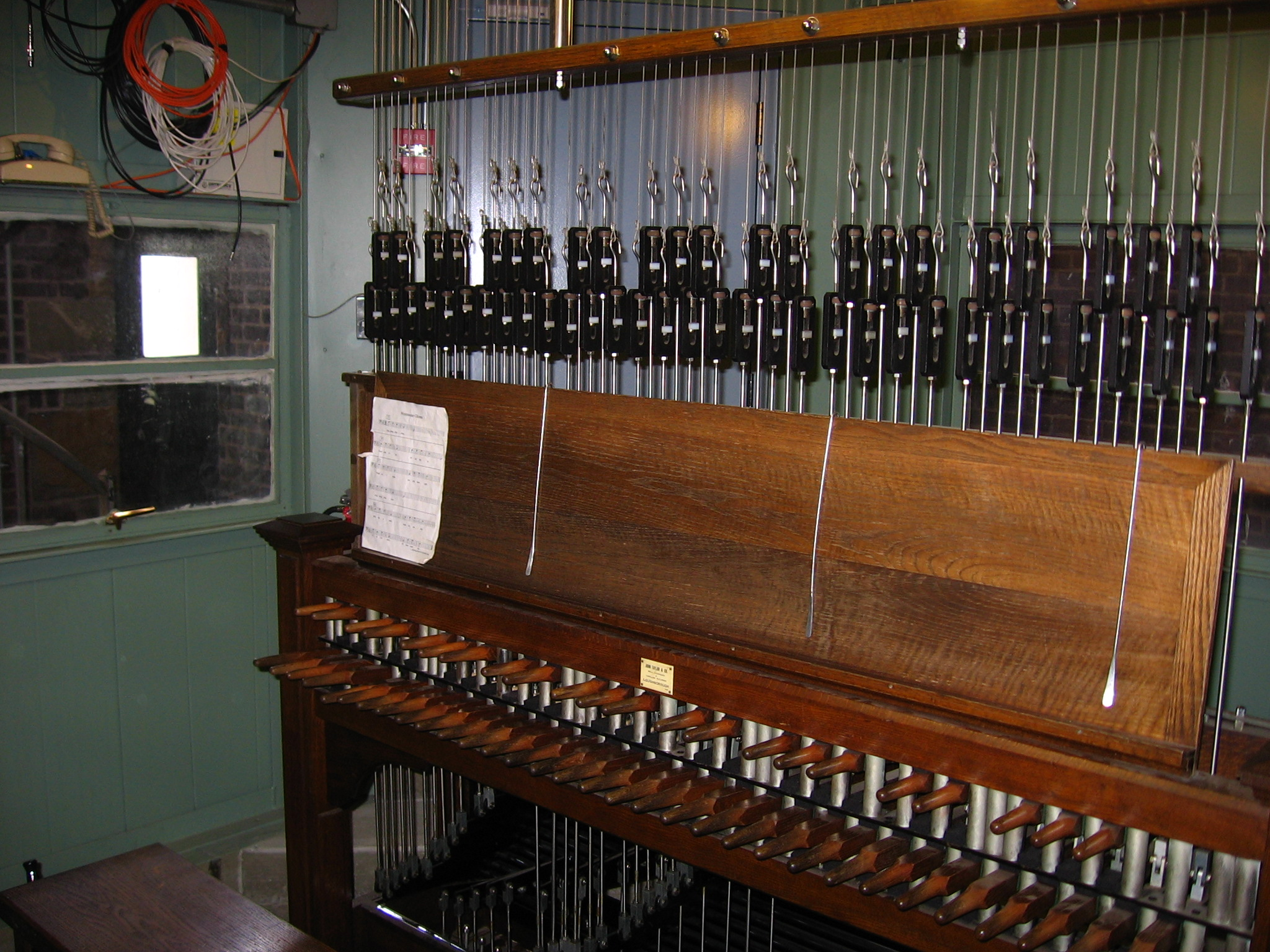
The console of the Yale Memorial Carillon

The tower contains the Yale Memorial Carillon, a 54-bell carillon. It is a transposing instrument; the C bell sounds a concert B. Ten bells were installed in 1922 and 44 added in 1966. The instrument is played by members of a student-run group set up for the purpose, the Yale Guild of Carillonneurs, and selected guest carillonneurs. During the school year, the instrument is played twice per day: a half-hour session at 12:30 p.m. and a one-hour session at 5:30 p.m. (Some residents of Branford College and Saybrook College, of which the tower forms a part of the periphery, have been known to refer to the daily performances as "Heavy Metal.") In summer it is played only in the evening, plus a summer series of Friday concerts. Carillon play was suspended in 2009 and 2010 during the tower's renovation.
