= Charles W. Harkness =

American businessman and railroad executive (1860–1916)

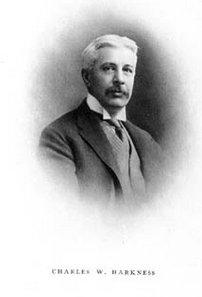
- Born: December 17, 1860; Monroeville, Ohio, US
- Died: May 1, 1916 (age 55); New York City, New York, US
- Resting place: Woodlawn Cemetery (Bronx, New York)
- Education: Yale College (1883)
- Occupations: Business investor and railroad executive
- Parent(s): Stephen V. Harkness; Anna M. Richardson

Charles William Harkness (December 17, 1860 – May 1, 1916) was an American businessman and railroad executive. He was director of Standard Oil; the Southern Pacific Railway Company; the Chicago, Milwaukee, and St. Paul Railway; the Baltimore and Ohio Railroad, and the Tilden Iron Mining Company. He was a son of Stephen V. Harkness, an original investor in the company that became Standard Oil, and his second wife, the former Anna M. Richardson.

== Early life ==
Charles was born in Monroeville, Ohio on December 17, 1860. His parents were Stephen V. Harkness (1818–1888) and the former Anna Marie Richardson (1837–1926), his father's second wife. He was the brother of Edward Harkness, a noted philanthropist and half-brother of Lamon V. Harkness. He was a cousin of William L. Harkness.

His early education was in Cleveland at The Brooks Military Academy. He earned a B.A. from Yale College with the Class of 1883. While at Yale, he was described as "care-free, happy, irresponsible as the rest of us."

== Career ==
On his father's death in 1888, Charles inherited stock in Standard Oil amounting to the second largest holding in the company, surpassed only by that of the Rockefeller family. Harkness became a director at Standard Oil and was a director of the Southern Pacific Railway Company; the Chicago, Milwaukee and St. Paul Railway; the Baltimore and Ohio Railroad; and the Tilden Iron Mining Company. He also managed his father's immense holdings.

== Personal life ==
On May 27, 1896, Harkness married Miss Mary Warden in Philadelphia, PA. Mary was the daughter of William G. Warden, who was an early Standard Oil partner, and the granddaughter of industrialist Daniel Bushnell.

Harkness purchased the Henry Flagler townhouse at 685 Fifth Avenue in New York City and also owned a home in Madison, New Jersey that was designed by James Gamble Rogers and a winter home in St. Augustine, Florida.

Harkness fell seriously ill in the fall of 1915. After spending part of winter in St. Augustine at his wife's family home at Warden Castle, he returned home to New York, where he died May 1, 1916. He was buried in Woodlawn Cemetery.

He left an estate of $170 million, worth $5.03 billion in 2025. Since he had no children, the large portion of his Standard Oil stock was left to his brother Edward S. Harkness. Half his residual estate, his home in New York at 2 West 54th Street and his country home in Madison were bequeathed to his wife Mary. He left $100,000 to his brother Lamon V. Harkness, although Lamon died a year earlier.

== Legacy ==
Harkness Tower at Yale is named after Charles W. Harkness. Anna Harkness, his mother, donated $3,000,000 to build the Memorial Quadrangle of dormitories in his memory. Harkness Tower contains the Yale Memorial Carillon, a carillon of 54 bells, the largest of which is inscribed "In Memory of Charles W. Harkness, Class of 1883, Yale College."

The Cleveland Museum of Art has a $100,000 permanent endowment known as the Charles W. Harkness Endowment Fund, which was created through a donation from his widow, Mary Warden Harkness.
