= Quincy House (Harvard College) =

Residential House of Harvard College

- Residential House at Harvard University
- Harvard University
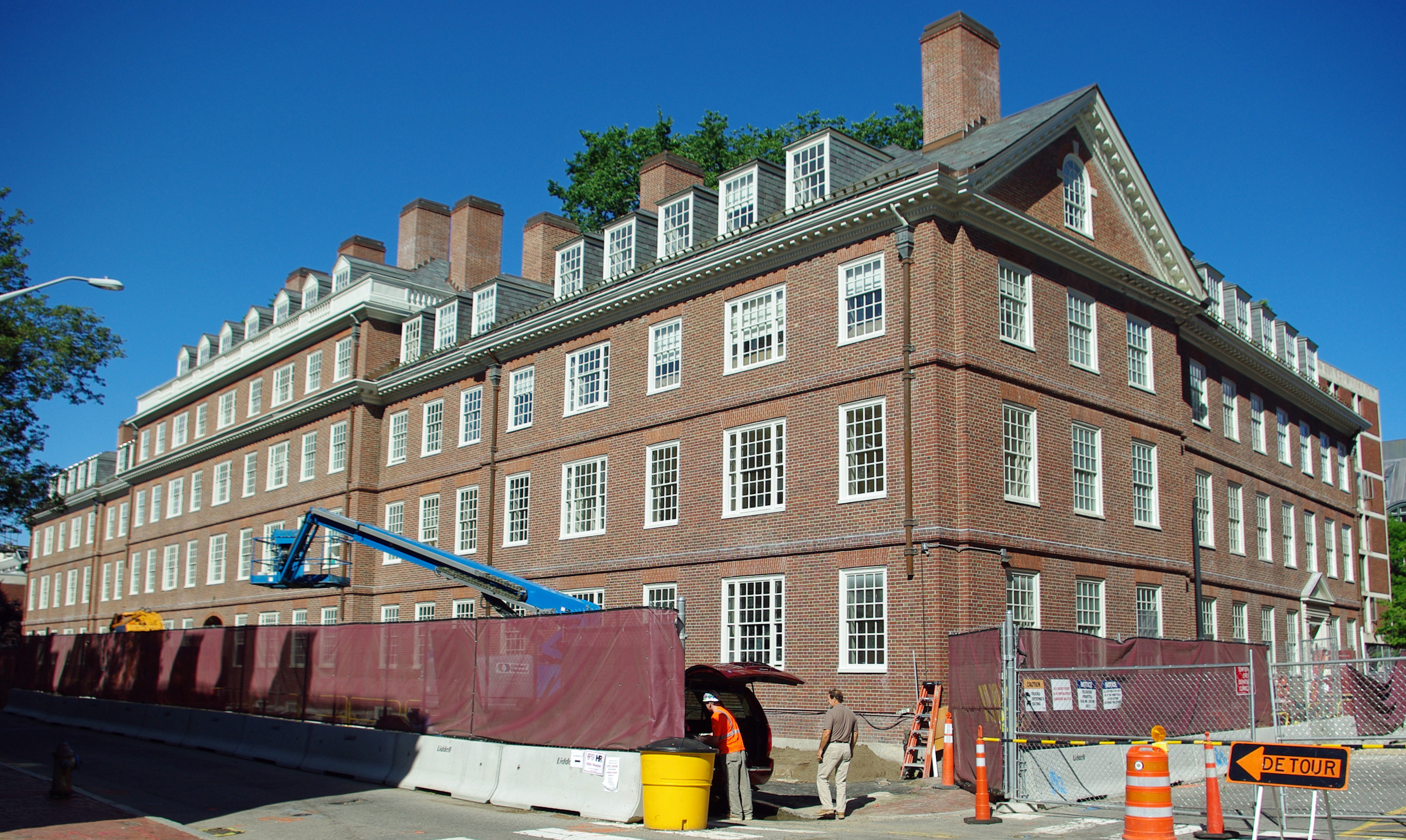
- Stone Hall (the former Increase Mather Hall, usually called "Old Quincy")

- Shield
- Location: 58 Plympton Street
- Coordinates: 42°22′14″N 71°07′02″W
- Full name: Josiah Quincy III House
- Established: 1959
- Named for: Josiah Quincy III
- Sister college: Branford College
- Freshman dorm: Pennypacker Hall
- Faculty Deans: Eric Beerbohm and Leslie Duhaylongsod
- Dean: Nicole S. Simon
- HoCo chairs: Jack "watch it, Nathan" Towers and Honor "Varun and Aidan" Pimentel
- Tutors: 21
- Website: quincy.harvard.edu

Quincy House (/ˈkwɪnzi/) is one of twelve undergraduate residential Houses at Harvard University, located on Plympton Street between Harvard Yard and the Charles River. The second largest of the twelve undergraduate houses, Quincy House was named after Josiah Quincy III (1772–1864), president of Harvard from 1829 to 1845. Quincy House's official counterpart at Yale University is Branford College.

House colors are red, gold, white, and black, and the House's seal in those colors is emblazoned on a wall of the dining hall wing facing the House's main courtyard. In 2005, Quincy House adopted the penguin as its official mascot. Its residents, nicknamed "penguins" after the mascot, live in the house during their sophomore through senior years.

== History ==
Officially opened in September 1959, Quincy House symbolized the "new" Harvard. As a part of the Edward Harkness bequest, it was the first House to be built after construction of the original seven river Houses. Three buildings currently house Quincy House students: Old Quincy, New Quincy, and 10 DeWolfe Street.

The older of the sections of Quincy House, "Old Quincy", underwent extensive renovations during the 2012–13 academic year, and opened in the fall of 2013 as Stone Hall. It had originally been named for early Harvard president Increase Mather and was part of Harvard's Leverett House until 1960. Constructed in 1929–30 during Abbott Lawrence Lowell's university presidency, its neo-Georgian exterior has been retained, but its finely detailed suites, high ceilings, carved moldings, and fireplaces have given way to modern suites, corridors that invite interaction between suite residents, and sunlit common rooms. Until the construction of New Quincy in the late 1950s necessitated their removal, the now open east side was enclosed by a one-story range of squash courts.

Designed by the Boston firm of Shepley, Bulfinch, Richardson, and Abbott, New Quincy is a modern eight-story high-rise with views of its more traditional neighbors. It consists of a two-story commons wing along Mt. Auburn Street, a nine-story main residence unit with split level suites having splendid views, and the raised, glass-walled House Library, nicknamed "the Qube", the placement of which adds a second interior court to the series of courtyards and gardens that are a distinctive part of the House.

The 10 DeWolfe Street residence hall is a brick structure with a double mansard roof of lead-coated copper. The 10 and 20 DeWolfe Street residences are overflow housing that have at various times housed freshmen, students from Leverett House, Dunster House, and Kirkland House.

The Quincy House served as an Olympic Village for competitors in football at the 1984 Summer Olympics.

== House life ==
The current Quincy House faculty deans are Eric Beerbohm and Leslie Duhaylongsod. Beerbohm is a professor of government in Harvard's Faculty of Arts and Sciences and Duhaylongsod is a professor in the Secondary and Higher Education department at Salem State University. House events are coordinated by the Quincy House Committee, or HoCo. The committee operates separately from the Harvard Undergraduate Council (UC) to organize student events and manage funding.

Quincy House is sometimes called "The People's House," referring to its ease of access by non-residents in Harvard College. Quincy House is centrally located and has few restrictions on dining hall access by students from other houses.

== Pronunciation ==
As Quincy House was named after Josiah Quincy III, the correct pronunciation is /ˈkwɪnzi/. It is widely mispronounced, however, as /ˈkwɪnsi/.

== Notable alumni ==
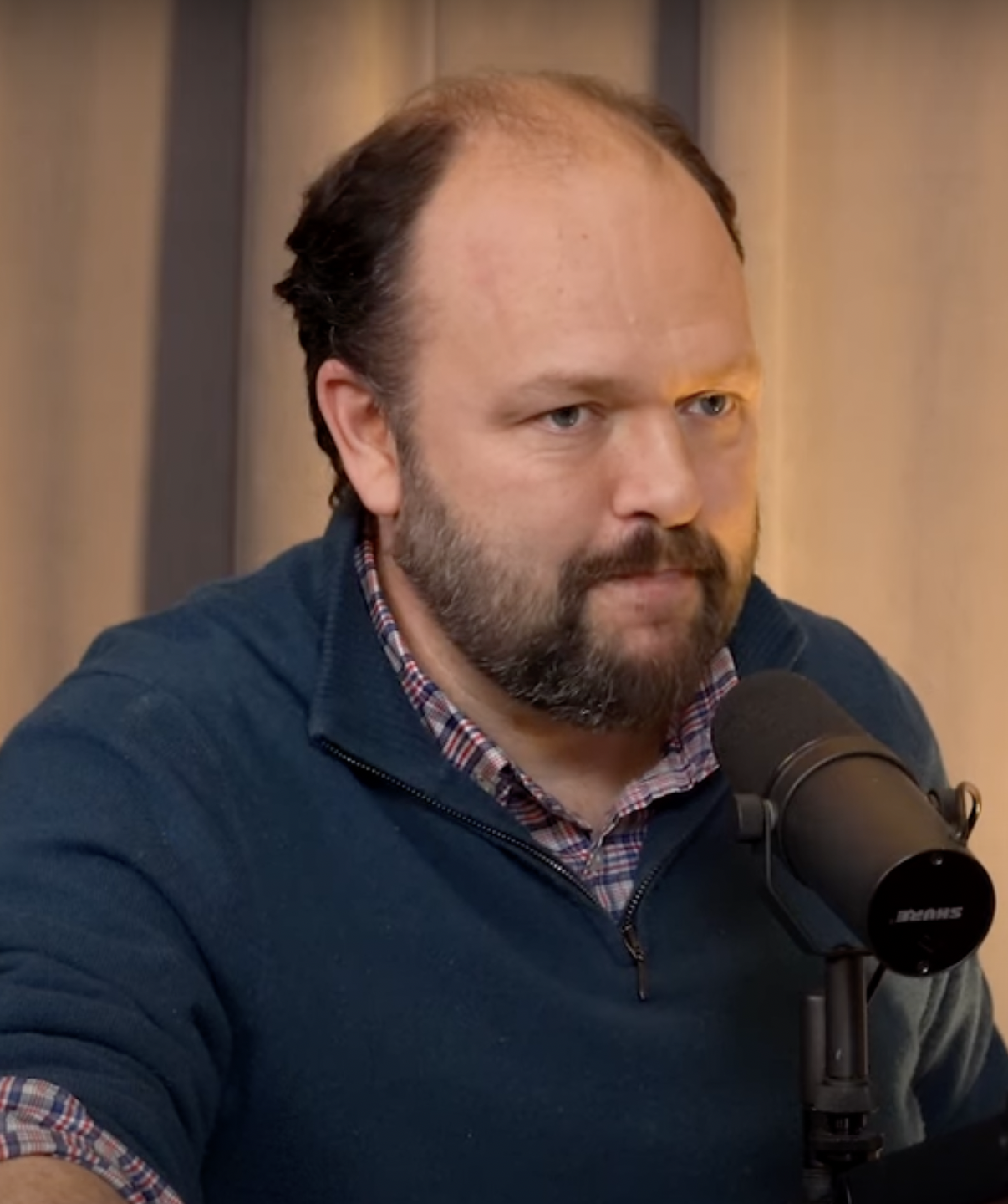
Ross Douthat

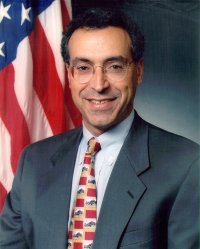
Seth P. Waxman

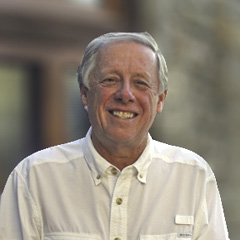
Phil Bredesen

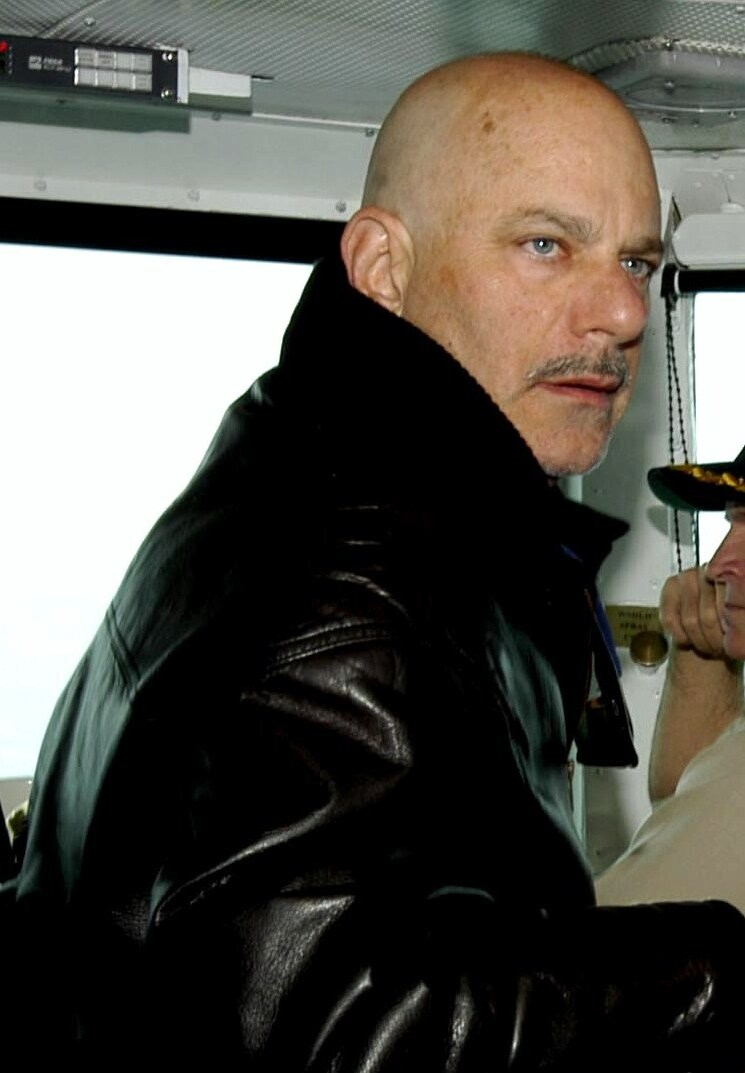
Rob Cohen

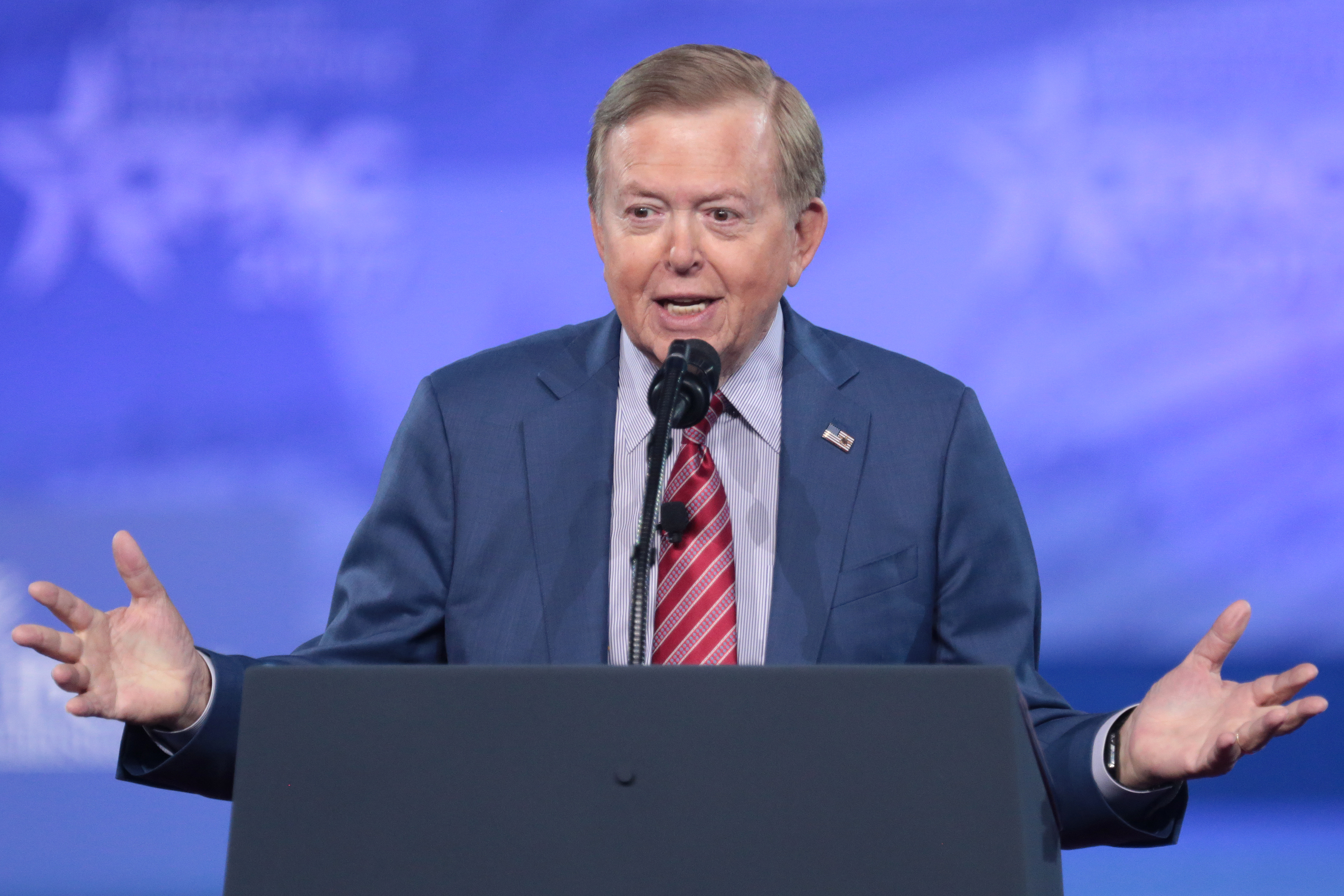
Lou Dobbs

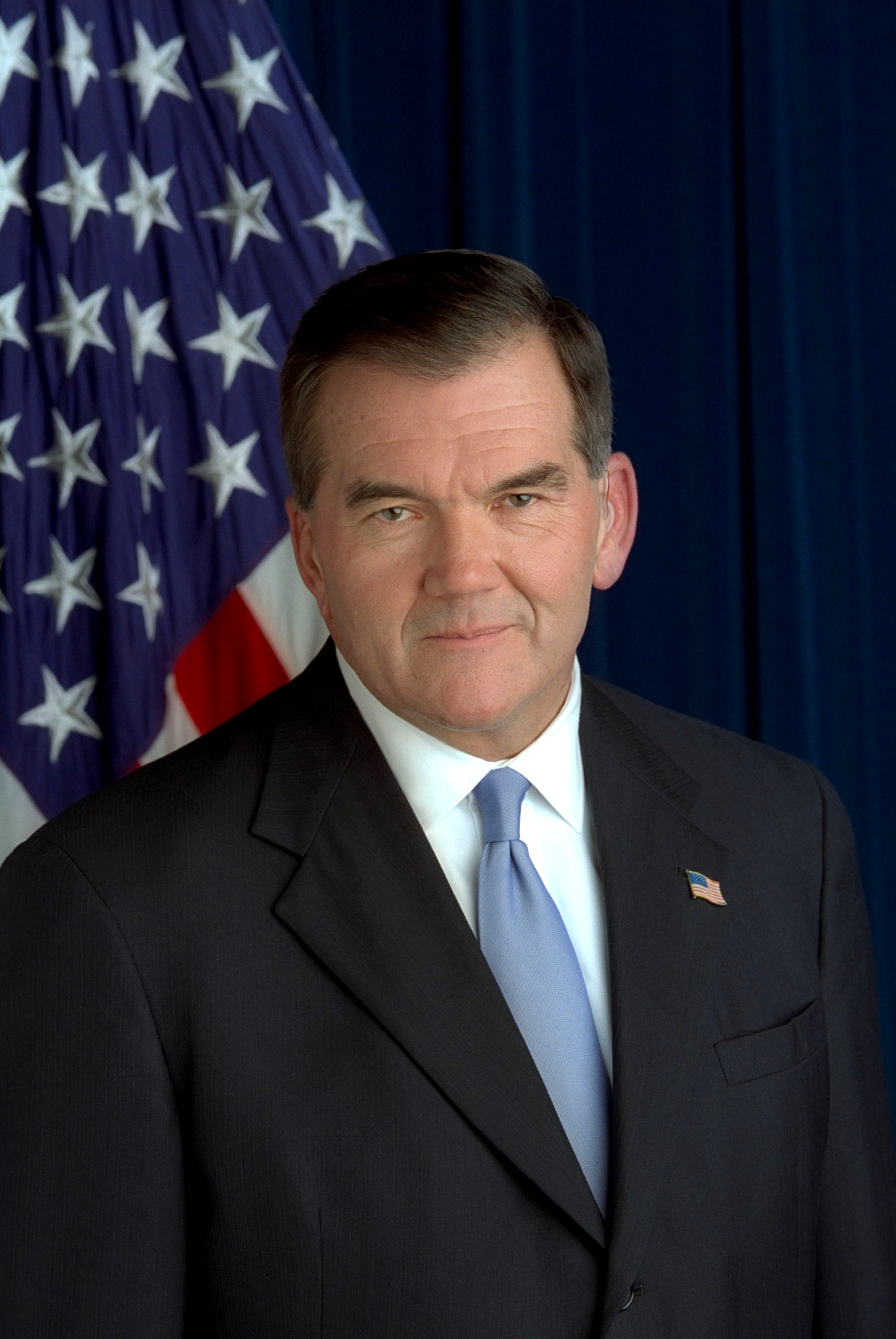
Tom Ridge

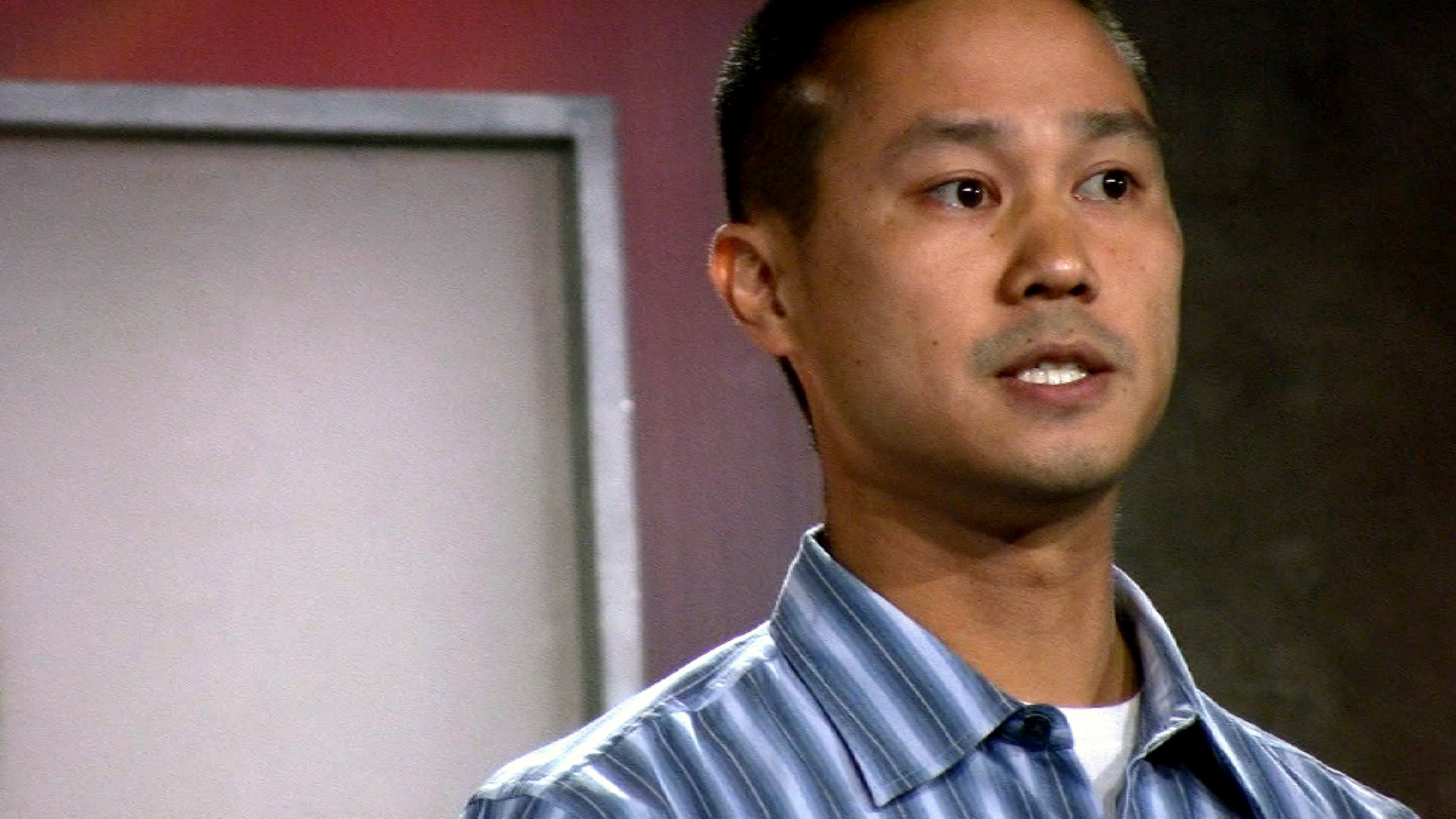
Tony Hsieh

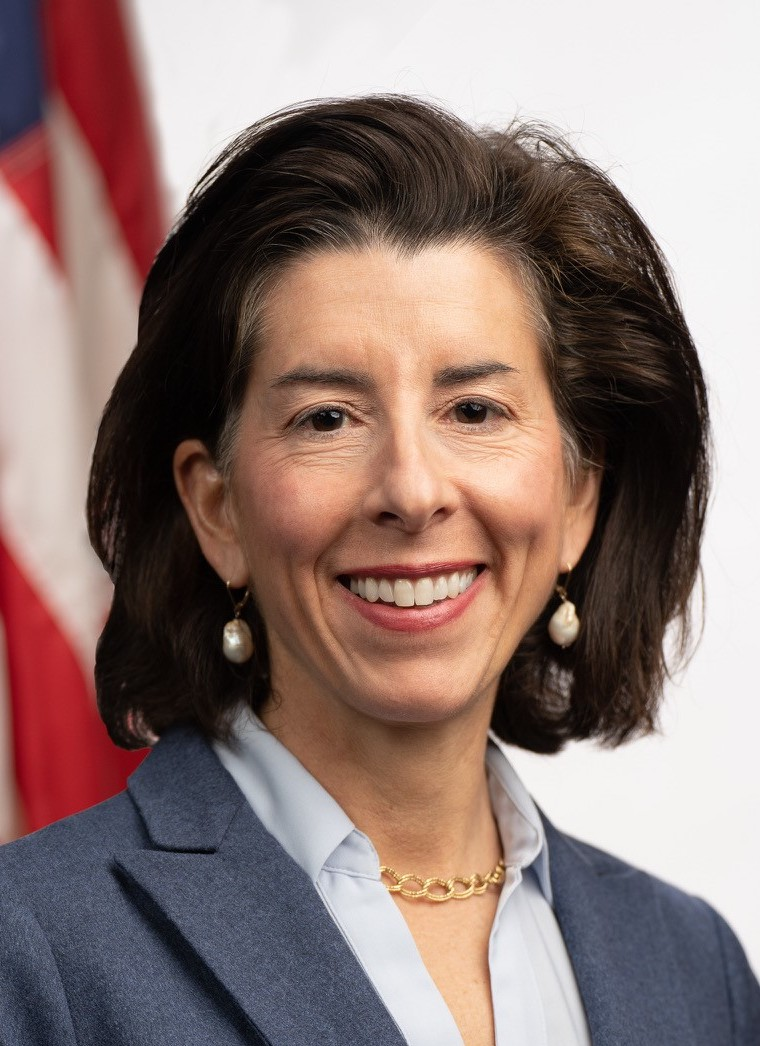
Gina Raimondo

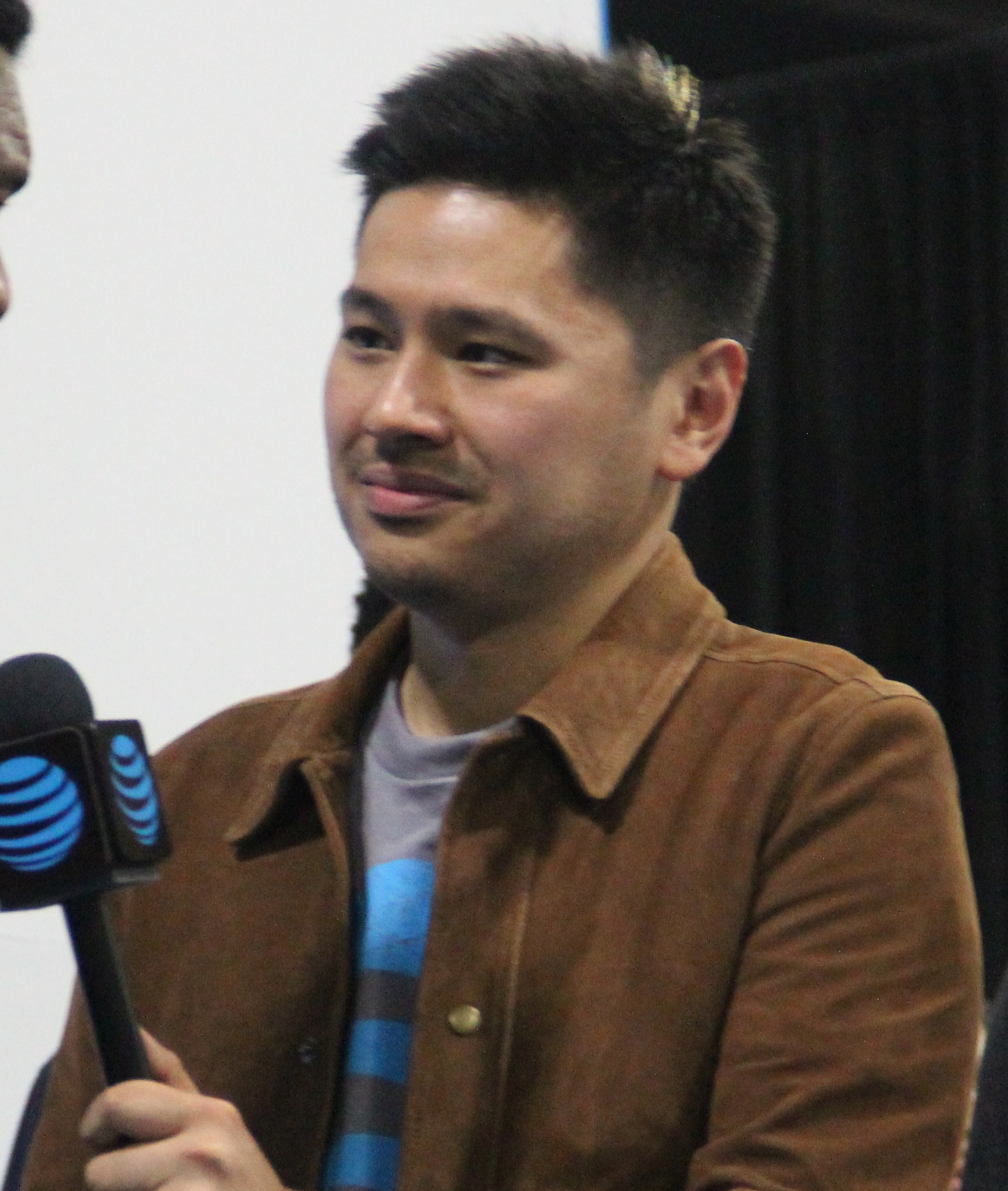
Pablo Torre

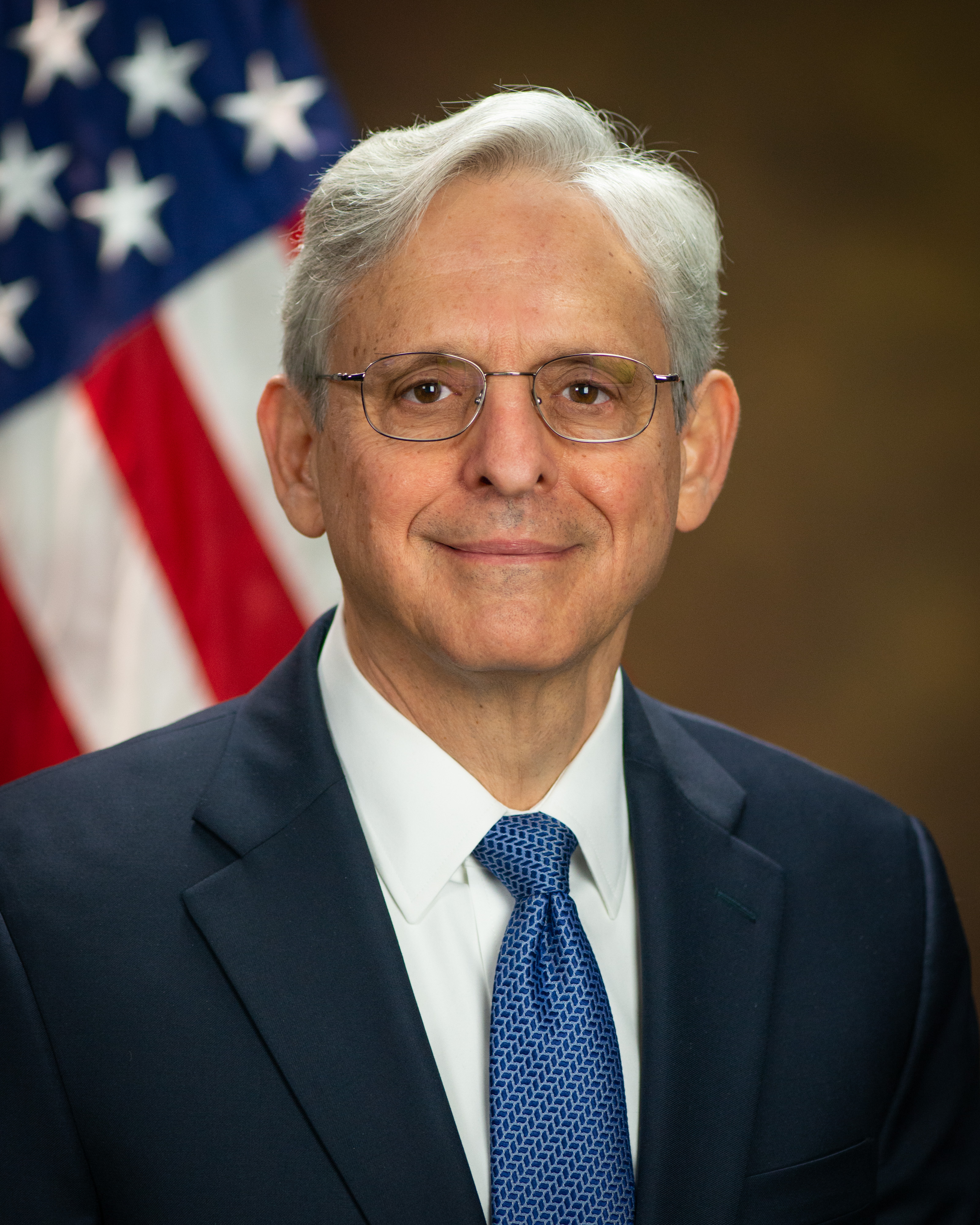
Merrick Garland

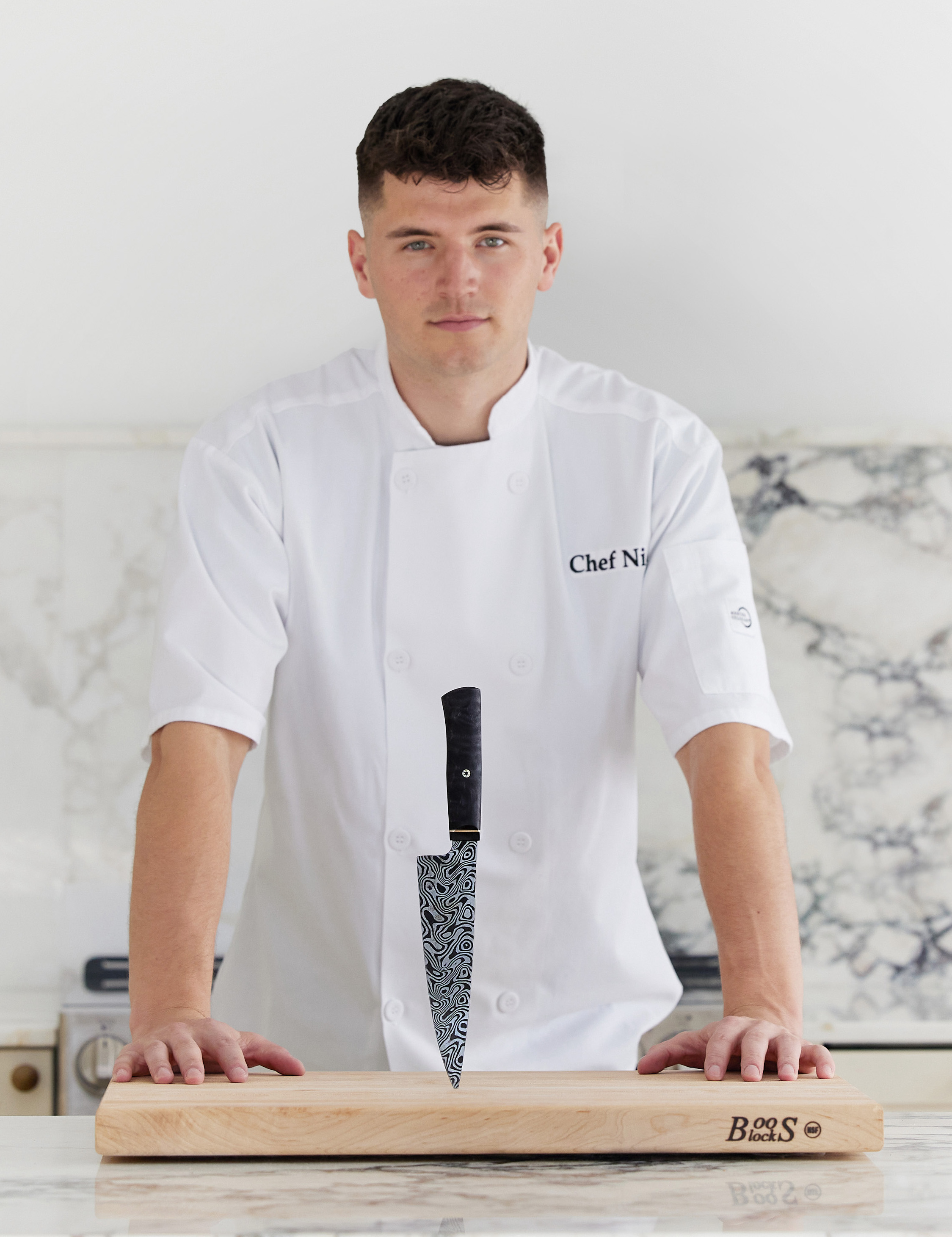
Nick DiGiovanni

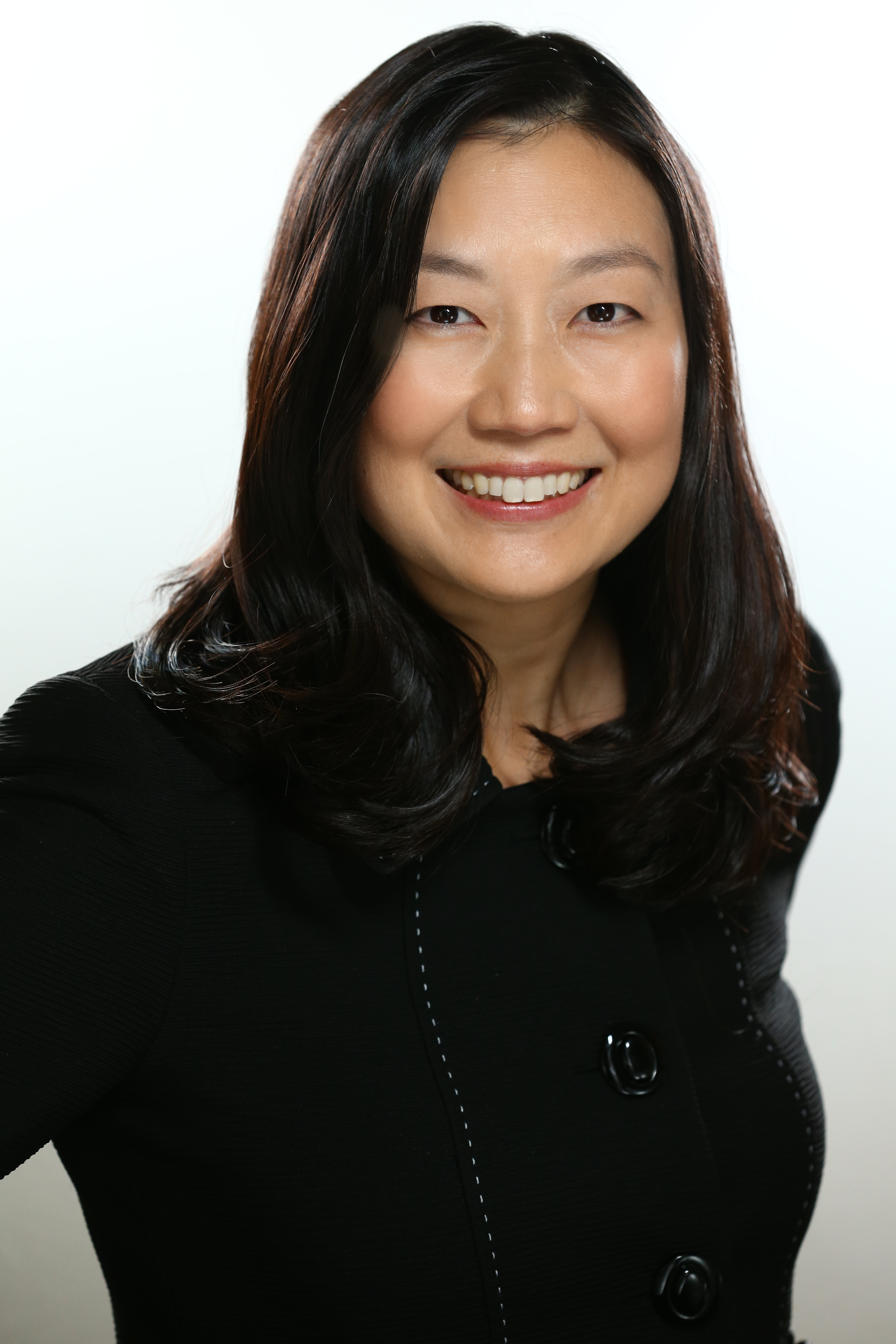
Lucy Koh

Other notable Quincy alumni include Nelson Denis, former Under Secretary of Defense for Policy Douglas Feith, Jamie Gorelick, Ron Kind, Peter Sagal, Suzanne Malveaux, Anthony Brown,Robert Kirshner, Joe Sanberg, and musician Dean Wareham. Seth Moulton was an affiliated tutor at Quincy House as a graduate student.
