= Memorial Quadrangle =

Building at Yale University

Coordinates: 41.3098°N 72.9297°W

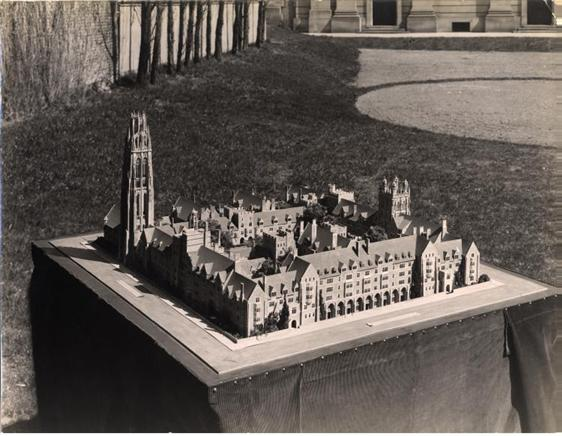
Model of the Memorial Quadrangle

The Memorial Quadrangle is a residential quadrangle at Yale University in New Haven, Connecticut. Commissioned in 1917 to supply much-needed student housing for Yale College, it was Yale's first Collegiate Gothic building and its first project by James Gamble Rogers, who later designed ten other major buildings for the university. The Quadrangle has been occupied by Saybrook College and Branford College, two of the original ten residential colleges at Yale. The collegiate system of Yale University was largely inspired by the Oxbridge model of residential and teaching colleges at the University of Oxford and the University of Cambridge in the UK.

The building was donated by Anna M. Harkness to memorialize her son, Yale College graduate Charles W. Harkness, who died in 1916. Charles' brother, Edward Harkness, became the primary benefactor of Yale's residential college system fifteen years later, a scheme which required a partial reconfiguration of the Memorial Quadrangle to create its two residential colleges. Harkness Tower, a large masonry tower on the building's west side, was named in memory of Charles Harkness, a memorial to whom is found in the tower's chapel.

== Building ==
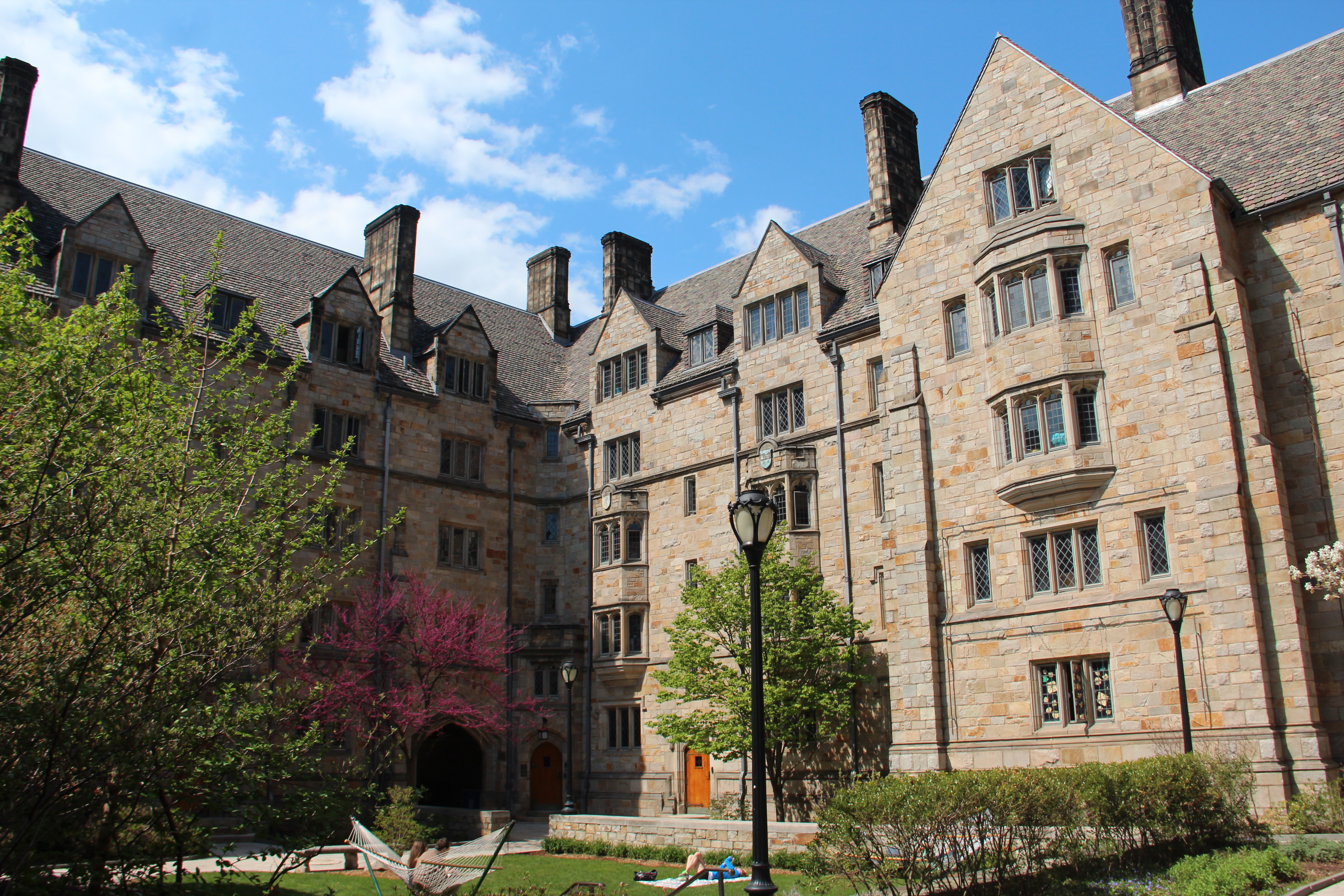
Killingworth Court, now part of Saybrook College

Construction began in 1917, the bicentennial of Yale's first building in New Haven, and was completed in 1921. As initially built, the Quadrangle contained dorm rooms for 630 students, a dining hall, and seven courtyards. Dry moats with low walls, a frequent architectural motif at Yale, were first used by this building and were planted with ivy, flowers, and trees by landscape architect Beatrix Jones Farrand with an eye to both increased privacy and street beautification.

Harkness Tower, the most visible symbol of Yale on the New Haven skyscape, is placed on an axis unifying it with Yale's Old Campus. The shorter Wrexham Tower is modeled on the tower of St Giles' Church in Wrexham, Wales, where Elihu Yale is buried.

The building is divided into seven courtyards, which Rogers framed with materials and decorative elements giving each distinct character. Three—Killingworth Court, Saybrook Court, and the largest, Branford Court—commemorate Connecticut towns significant to the school's founding, and a fourth, Wrexham Court, commemorating the city of Wrexham in Wales, the resting place of Elihu Yale. The other three, on the building's southern side and now part of Branford College, are named for early debating societies in Yale College: Brothers in Unity Court, Linonia Court, and Calliope Court after the Calliopean Society. Walls around these southward courtyards are several stories shorter than those on the north, allowing light to fill all of the quadrangle's open spaces more evenly.

The building's masonry exterior is richly ornamented, and much of the decoration commemorates distinguished university graduates. The gate beneath Harkness Tower, crafted by Samuel Yellin, is the most ornate of his many works at Yale. G. Owen Bonawit designed unique stained glass windowpanes for each student room. The roof of the building has been tiled with a custom Ludowici clay shingle since its construction.

== Residential college integration ==
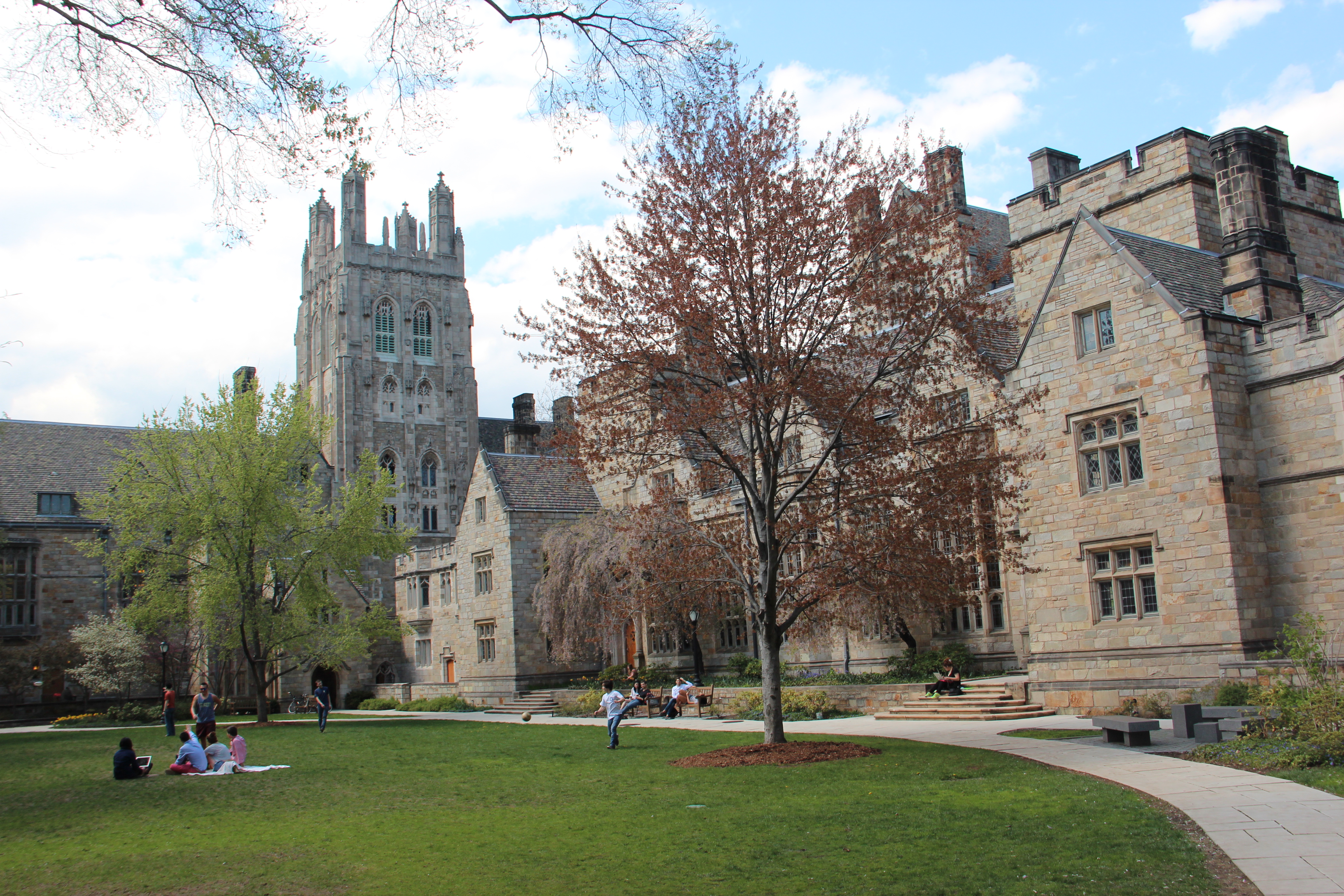
Branford Court and Saybrook dining hall, at right, created during the quadrangle's conversion to residential colleges

From 1921 to 1929 the building housed Yale College seniors. In 1928, a donation from Edward Harkness began Yale's residential college system, the buildings of which were also planned and designed by Rogers. Rogers split the Quadrangle into two residential colleges—Saybrook and Branford, so named for the courtyards they contain—and added mid-sized elements such as masters' houses, fellow's quarters, and dining halls. During the conversion, the "Gold Coast" of student rooms in the middle of the Quadrangle was hollowed out to make way for the Saybrook College dining hall. The colleges opened on September 25, 1933.

== Influence ==
The Memorial Quadrangle became the template for Yale's residential college system. First announced as a "Quadrangle Plan," the colleges were built around the same courtyard and dining hall design pioneered. In addition to the two colleges that were created within the Memorial Quadrangle, six others—Jonathan Edwards, Davenport, Calhoun, Trumbull, and Berkeley—followed the same Collegiate Gothic style. Because of his initial work on the Memorial Quadrangle, Rogers became the de facto architect of Yale's central campus through the 1920s and 1930s: eight of the ten early residential colleges were his design, as were Sterling Memorial Library, Sterling Law Building, and the Hall of Graduate Studies. Many of the artisans who worked on the Memorial Quadrangle with Rogers, including G. Owen Bonawit and blacksmith Samuel Yellin, were commissioned again for these later buildings.

The quadrangle was an antecedent of the Collegiate Gothic style used throughout the United States, and of large residential campuses of the 20th century, including Harvard College and Rice University. In particular, plans for creating a residential undergraduate campus at the University of Chicago made heavy reference to the Memorial Quadrangle.
