= Saybrook College =

Residential college at Yale University

- Residential college at Yale University
- Yale University
- Coat of arms of Saybrook College
- Location: 242 Elm Street (map)
- Coordinates: 41°18′37″N 72°55′46″W
- Nickname: Saybrugians
- Motto: Qui transtulit sustinet (Latin)
- Motto in English: He who transplanted still remains Say what? Saybrook!
- Established: 1933
- Named for: Old Saybrook, Connecticut
- Colors: Blue, gold
- Sister college: Adams House, Harvard; Emmanuel College, Cambridge
- Head of College: Thomas J. Near
- Dean: Adam Haliburton
- Undergraduates: 484 (2013-2014)
- Mascot: Grapes, historically seal
- Website: Saybrook College

Saybrook College is one of the 14 residential colleges at Yale University.

== Buildings and architecture ==
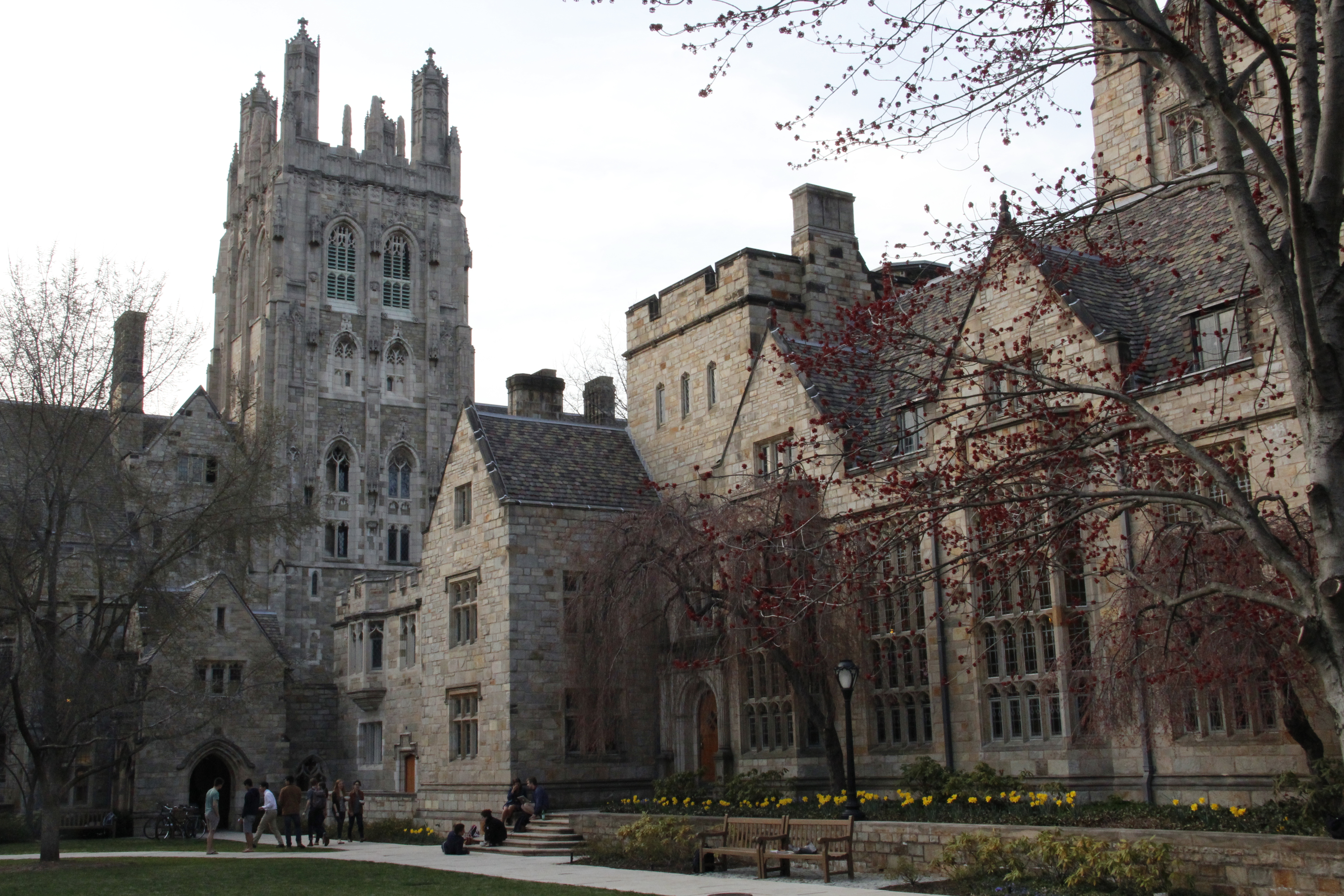
'Wrexham Tower' of Yale University, replica of St Giles' Church, Wrexham

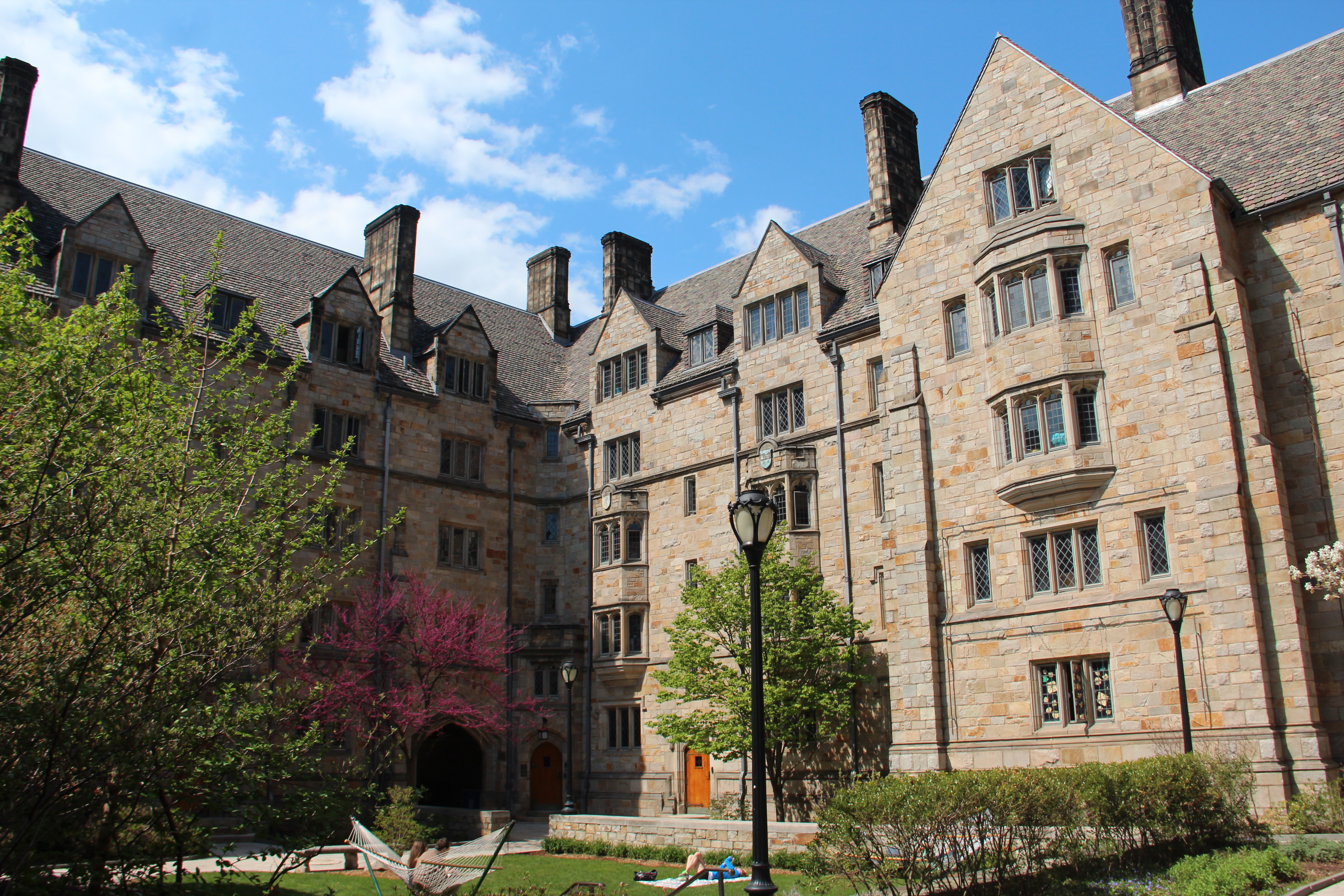
Killingworth Court

The building now known as Saybrook and Branford Colleges was built as the Memorial Quadrangle on the site of what was once the old gymnasium. Designed by James Gamble Rogers, the quadrangle was built from 1917 to 1922. In 1928, Edward Harkness, who had funded the Memorial Quadrangle project, gave Yale funding to build eight residential colleges, and administrators decided to reconfigure the building into two of the new colleges. The two northern courtyards became the center of Saybrook College, and a wall of dormitories on the college's south side was demolished to build a dining hall and common room for the new college.

The courtyards are named for the towns Yale occupied before its move to New Haven: Killingworth Court after Killingworth, Connecticut, where Rector Abraham Pierson first held classes, and Saybrook Court after Old Saybrook, Connecticut, where it resided as the Collegiate School from 1703 to 1718. Among the flagstones of each courtyard is a millstone originating from their respective namesakes. The main courtyards are also decorated with carvings and inscriptions. Around the entryways are the stone heads of various associates of Yale University, including Vance McCormick, former chairman of the Yale Corporation's architectural planning committee, and Russell Chittenden, former director of the Sheffield Scientific School. In Saybrook Court are the arms of several American universities and of Elihu Yale and Edward Harkness. In Killingworth Court are the arms of Yale, Harvard, and Saybrook's sister colleges Adams House and Emmanuel College. Each student room is decorated with panes of stained glass from G. Owen Bonawit.

Wrexham Tower, modeled after the tower of St. Giles' Church in Wrexham, Wales, where Elihu Yale is buried, stands in the college's westernmost corner over a very small courtyard of its own. In the tower's base is an inscribed stone sent from St. Giles' as a gift to Yale. On the wall across from the tower's entrance is a plaque commemorating James Gamble Rogers.

Saybrook's freshmen were housed in Lanman-Wright Hall and Bingham Hall on Old Campus (as were the freshmen of Pierson College). Lanman-Wright Hall was designed by William Adams Delano and constructed in 1912. Starting in the fall of 2011, Saybrook's freshmen were housed in Vanderbilt Hall on Old Campus (built in 1894). As of Fall 2025, Saybrook’s first-year students are now housed in Durfee Hall on Old Campus (built in 1871; second oldest residential building at Yale).

The college was renovated during the 2000-2001 year.

== Arms and badge ==
The arms of Saybrook College are the quartering of the arms of William Fiennes, 1st Viscount Saye and Sele and of Robert Greville, 2nd Baron Brooke, who were the early promoters of the Saybrook Colony, where Yale would later be founded. The arms of Saybrook College are described heraldically as: Quarterly I and IV azure, three lions rampant or; II and III sable, an engrailed cross within a border engrailed both or, and five roundels sable on the cross.

The badge of Saybrook College is the grapevine, derived from the original seal of Saybrook Colony. The badge appears carved in various places around the college.

== Saybrook strip song ==
Saybrook students are known on campus for "the Saybrook Strip", a ritual performed during football games at the end of the third quarter. Male and female college residents strip down to their underwear (some seniors remove all their clothing during The Game) The words to the Saybrook strip song change to accommodate the names of the current Head of College and Dean.

The current lyrics of the Saybrook Chant:

Two Courtyards; stone and grass

Two Courtyards kick your ass.

Climb the tower; touch the beach,

do it up at the Sqüiche.

Dean Haliburton and Prof. Near too,

Seals and Grapes we love you.

Bif Bam Bop Bip,

we are Saybrook — watch us strip!

== Heads and Deans ==
Elisha Atkins served as master of the college from 1975 to 1985, followed by Ann Ameling, the first female master of Saybrook.

Antonio Lasaga, a highly regarded geochemist, began a term as master in 1996. His service abruptly ended in 1998 when the Federal Bureau of Investigation (FBI) searched his house for a collection of child pornography, and in 2002 he was given a 20-year jail sentence for the sexual assault of a child. Mary Miller, a scholar of Mesoamerican art, was appointed master in 1999 to restore the college's structure and morale. After a nine-year term, Miller was appointed dean of Yale College in December 2008. Her husband, Edward Kamens, served as interim master.

In the fall of 2009, computer science professor Paul Hudak became the ninth master of Saybrook. A programming language designer, and jazz pianist, a co-designer of the language Haskell, Hudak did work in the language Haskore, which is used for sound production. He was head coach of Hamden High's women's lacrosse team for eight years. He was married to Cathy Van Dyke, and had two daughters, Cris Hudak and Jen Hudak. He was also the only Master of Saybrook to have participated in the Saybrook Strip. In November 2010, Hudak took a medical leave of absence; Kamens served again as interim master until Hudak returned at the start of the 2011–2012 school year. Hudak resigned from the mastership and died three months later.

#	Head	Term	Dean	Term
1	Elliot Dunlap Smith	1933–1946	Thomas Adams Noble	1963–1964
2	Sydney Knox Mitchell (acting)	1944–1945	James King Folsom	1964–1968
3	Everett Victor Meeks (acting)	1945–1946	Martin Ignatius Joseph Griffin, Jr (acting)	1968–1971
4	Basil Duke Henning	1946–1975	J. Mintz	1971–1972
5	William Huse Dunham, Jr (acting)	1955–1956	C. Duncan Rice	1972–1978
6	Ethelbert Talbot Donaldson (acting)	1963–1964	Susan I. Rice	1978–1980
7	Elting Elmore Morison (acting)	1967–1968	Thomas Peter Gariepy	1980–1985
8	Charles Ralph Boxer (acting)	1970–1971	Norman C. Keul	1985–1993
9	Elisha Atkins	1975–1985	James R. Van de Velde	1993–1997
10	Louis Lohr Martz (acting)	1978–1979	Paul S. McKinley	1997–2003
11	Ann Ameling	1985–1990	Lisa Collins	2003–2005
12	James Thomas	1990–1996	Paul S. McKinley	2005–2012
13	Antonio Lasaga	1996–1998	Christine Muller	2012–2018
14	Harry Adams (acting)	1998–1999	Ferentz Lafargue	2018–2023
15	Mary E. Miller	1999–2008	Adam Haliburton	2023-present
16	Edward Kamens	2008–2009		
17	Paul Hudak	2009–2015		
18	Thomas J. Near	2015–2026		
19	David Vasseur	2026-Present		

In 2016, the title of "Master" was changed to "Head of College".

== Notable alumni ==
- James Whitmore '45W – actor; won a Golden Globe Award, a Grammy Award, a Primetime Emmy Award, a Theatre World Award, and a Tony Award, plus two Academy Award nominations
- Dick Cavett '58 – talk show host
- Richard Posner '59 – United States Federal Judge
- A. Bartlett Giamatti '60 – former President of Yale and Commissioner of Major League Baseball
- Oliver Stone '68 – film director, producer, and screenwriter
- Donald Verrilli '79 – United States Solicitor General, 2011–2016
- Maya Lin '81 – designer and sculptor
- Elizabeth Kolbert '83 – Pulitzer-Prize winning journalist
- Charles Rivkin '84 – CEO of the Motion Pictures Association; former US Ambassador to France and Monaco
- Gideon Rose, '85 – member of the Council on Foreign Relations and former editor of Foreign Affairs
- Ron DeSantis, '01 – Governor of Florida
- Kellie Martin '01 – actress
- Benjamin L. Liebman, '91 – Professor
- Chris Cuomo, '92 – journalist
