= George Schaefer =

George Scha(e)f(f)er may refer to:

- George J. Schaefer (1888–1981), American film producer and studio executive
- George Schaefer (finance), American banking executive
- George Schaefer (director) (1920–1997), American television and theatre director and president of the Directors Guild of America
- George Schaefer (businessman) (1928–2013), American businessman, CEO of Caterpillar Inc.
- George Schaefer (bishop) (born 1950), bishop of the Russian Orthodox Church Outside of Russia
- George Schaeffer, American football player
- George C. Schaeffer (1814–1873), American engineer, chemist, and librarian
- George E. Schafer (1922–2015), United States Air Force surgeon general
- Georg Schäfer (industrialist) (1896–1975), German industrialist and art collector
- Georg Schäfer (artist) (1926–1991), German-American painter
- Georg Anton Schäffer (1779–1836), German physician
- George Schaefer (baseball) (born 1989), American baseball coach and pitcher
