= Columbia University Libraries =

Academic library system in New York

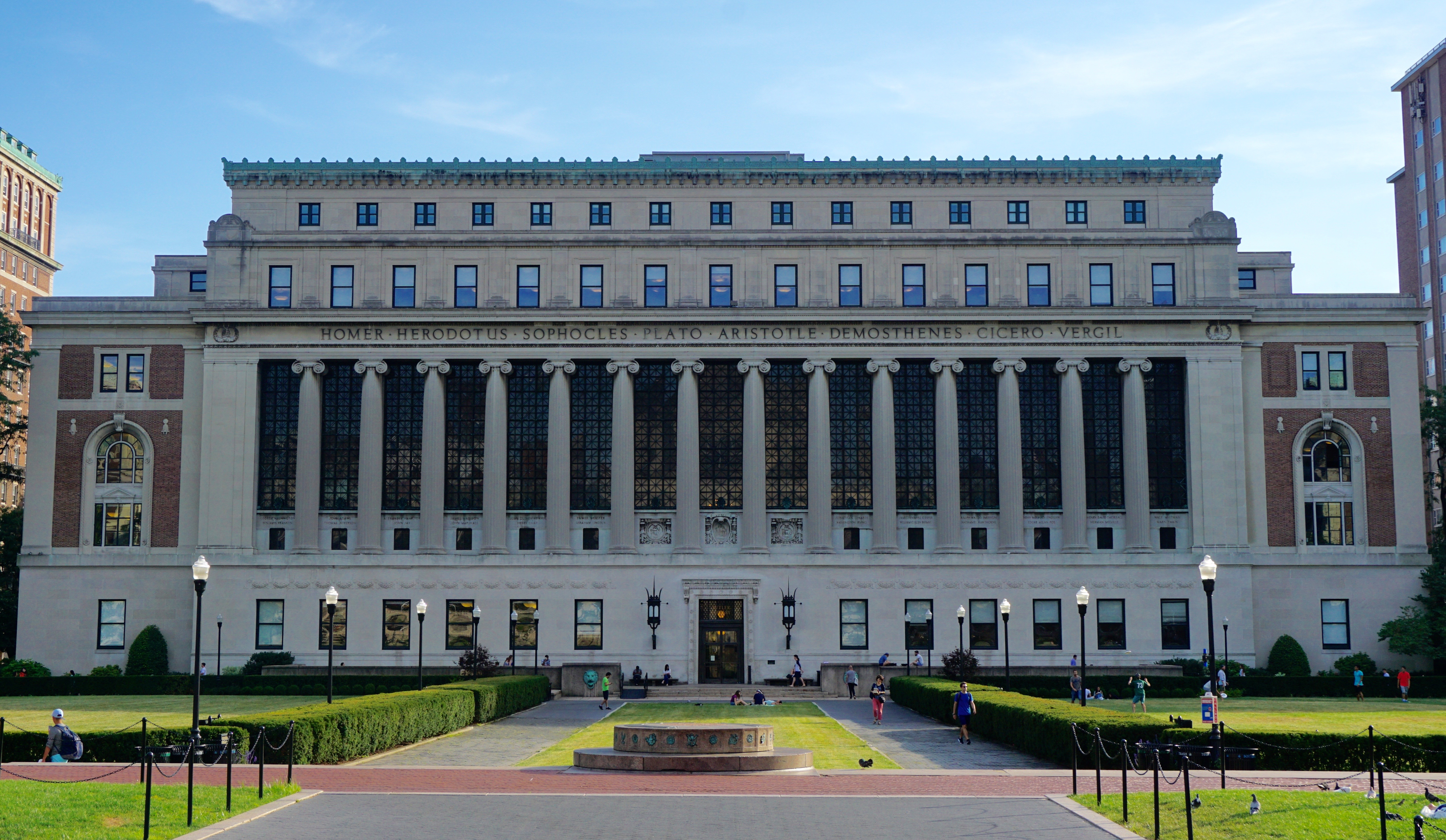
- Butler Library at Columbia University
- Location: New York City, U.S.
- Type: Academic library system
- Established: 1756
- Branches: 19

Collection
- Size: 15.0 million

Access and use
- Circulation: 252,577 (2016)
- Population served: over 4 million

Other information
- Budget: US$70 million
- Director: Ann D. Thornton
- Employees: 501 (2020)
- Website: library.columbia.edu

Columbia University Libraries is the library system of Columbia University and one of the largest academic library systems in North America. With 15.0 million volumes and over 160,000 journals and serials, as well as extensive electronic resources, manuscripts, rare books, microforms, maps, and graphic and audio-visual materials, it is the fifth-largest academic library in the United States and the largest in the State of New York. The closely affiliated Jewish Theological Seminary Library holds over 400,000 volumes, which combined makes the Columbia University Libraries the third-largest academic library, and the second-largest private library, in the United States.

The services and collections are organized into 19 libraries and various academic technology centers, including affiliates. The organization is located on the university's Morningside Heights campus in New York City and employs more than 500 professional and support staff. Additionally, Columbia Libraries is part of the Research Collections and Preservation Consortium (ReCAP) along with the Harvard Library, Princeton University Library, and New York Public Library.

== History ==
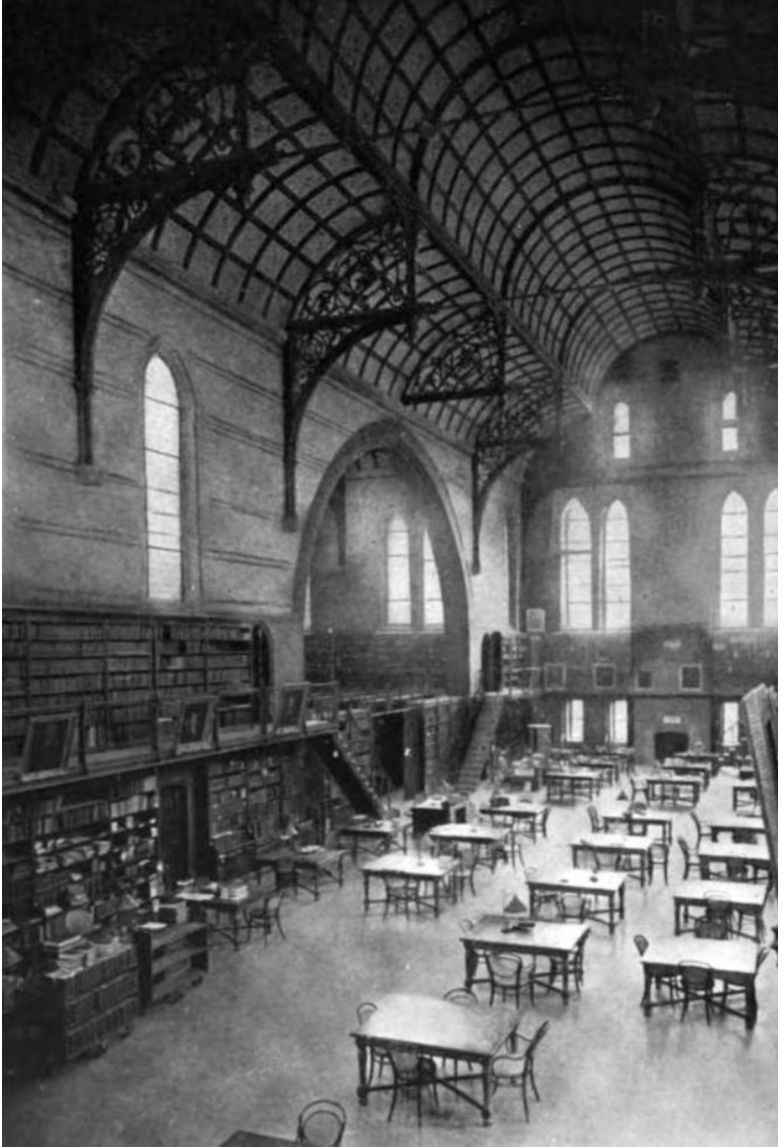
Madison Avenue campus library interior, 1904

The Columbia University Libraries began with the 1756 donation of the estate and library of Joseph Murray to the university, then known as King's College. Valued at around £8,000, it was the largest single philanthropic gift made in colonial America. In 1763 the college received over 1,000 volumes from Reverend Duncombe Bristowe of London, through the Society for the Propagation of the Gospel in Foreign Parts. Among its early gifts, the college recorded that "Sundry gentlemen at Oxford gave books, whose names are in them", and in 1772 the college received directly from Oxford University, at the request of President Myles Cooper, a copy of every book published by the Oxford University Press.

The King's College collection would largely not survive the American Revolutionary War. In 1776, College Hall was commandeered by the New York Committee of Safety to be used as a military hospital and instruction was suspended, in preparation for which the contents of the college's library had been deposited in the New York City Hall. Only six or seven hundred items from the King's College library were recovered following the war, and only 111 remain in Columbia University's collections today. Following the war, the newly renamed Columbia College's library was rebuilt and grew over time through gifts, deposits, and purchases; by 1863 it owned nearly 15,000 volumes. Valuable acquisitions during this time period included the 1825 purchase of 264 books from the library of Lorenzo Da Ponte, and the donation of the library of Nathaniel Fish Moore to the college.

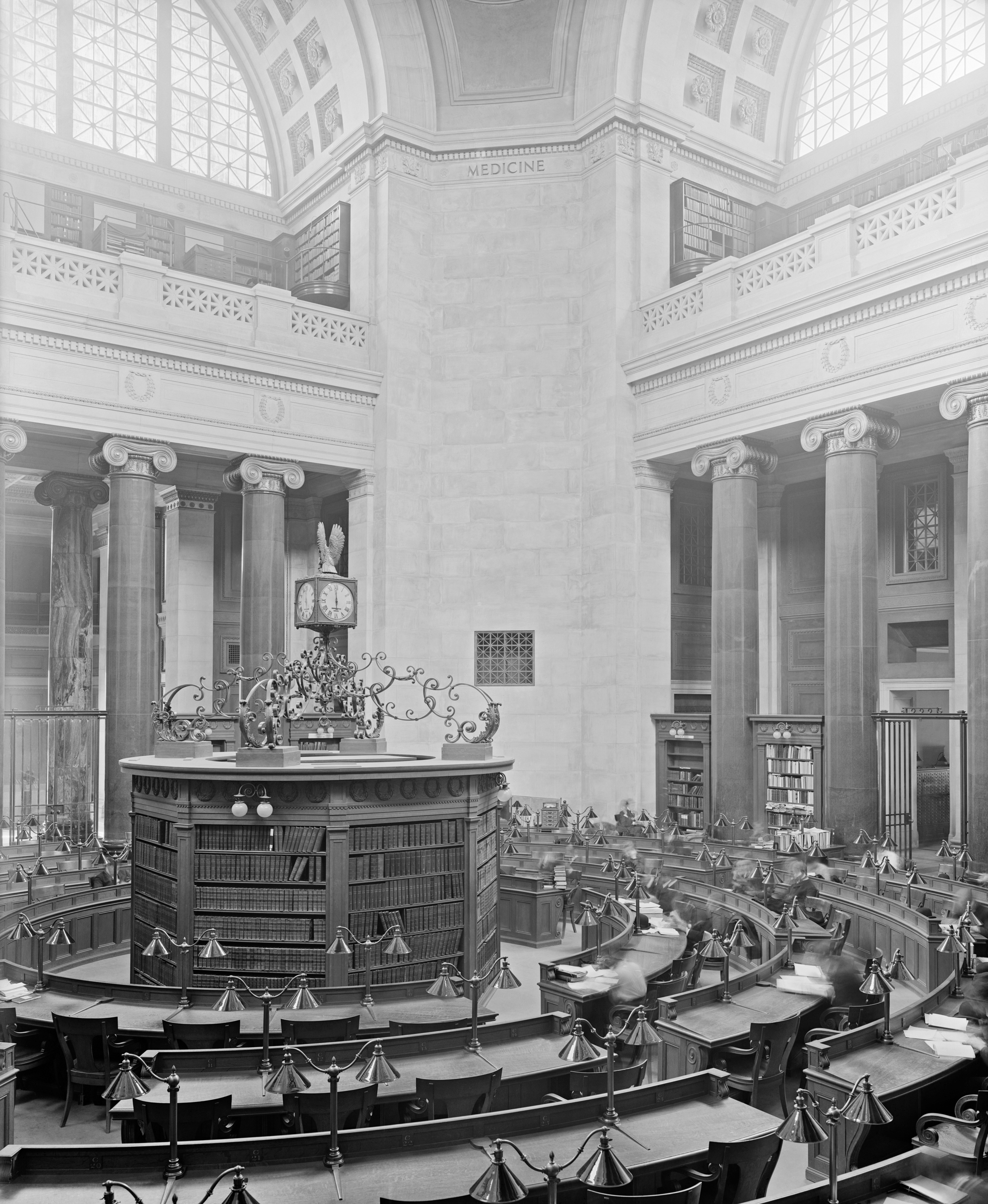
Low Library rotunda, c. 1900–1910

The physical location of the library has moved several times over the course of the university's history. Originally housed in College Hall on Columbia's Park Place campus, it relocated to the university's newly acquired Madison Avenue campus in 1857. A new building for the library designed by Charles C. Haight was completed in 1883. From 1883 to 1888, Melvil Dewey, the creator of the Dewey Decimal Classification and a founder of the American Library Association, was the chief librarian at Columbia, where he also founded the world's first library school in 1887. As librarian, Dewey reorganized the Columbia Libraries, unifying them under one efficient administration and creating a staff service.

In the 1890s Columbia was declared a university and moved to its current location in Morningside Heights. There, the Low Memorial Library was built in 1895 to serve as the centerpiece of the new campus. Financed with $1 million of University President Seth Low's own money, at full capacity the library was expected to house 1.9 million volumes. However, the library at this point was growing quickly, and the Low Library would soon not be enough to accommodate its entire collection: in 1904 the Columbia University Libraries held around 400,000 books, a number which would swell to more than a million in little over two decades. Butler Library, currently Columbia's main library, was built 1931 in and funded by a $4 million gift from alumnus and philanthropist Edward Harkness. Following its opening in 1934, only special collections, Columbiana, and the East Asian, mathematics, and general sciences sections remained in Low; those too would eventually be relocated elsewhere.

In 1974 the library became, along with Harvard Library, Yale Library, and New York Public Library, a founding member of the Research Libraries Group.

== Collection ==
As of 2020, the Columbia library system contains over 15.0 million volumes, its collections including over 160,000 journals and serials, six million microfilms, 26 million manuscripts, over 600,000 rare books, over 100,000 videos and DVDs, and nearly 200,000 government documents. The library's collection would stretch 174 miles end-to-end, and is growing at a pace of 140,000 items per annum. The system attracts over four million visitors a year.

The Columbia Center for Oral History Research, the oldest academic oral history research program, was founded at Columbia by Professor Allan Nevins in 1948. Its oral history archives are stored in Butler Library, and contain over 12,000 interviews.

Columbia shares an off-site shelving facility, located in Plainsboro, New Jersey, with the Research Collections and Preservation Consortium (RECAP), which includes the New York Public Library and the library systems of Harvard University and Princeton University. The system is participating in the Google Books Library Project.

== Libraries at Columbia ==
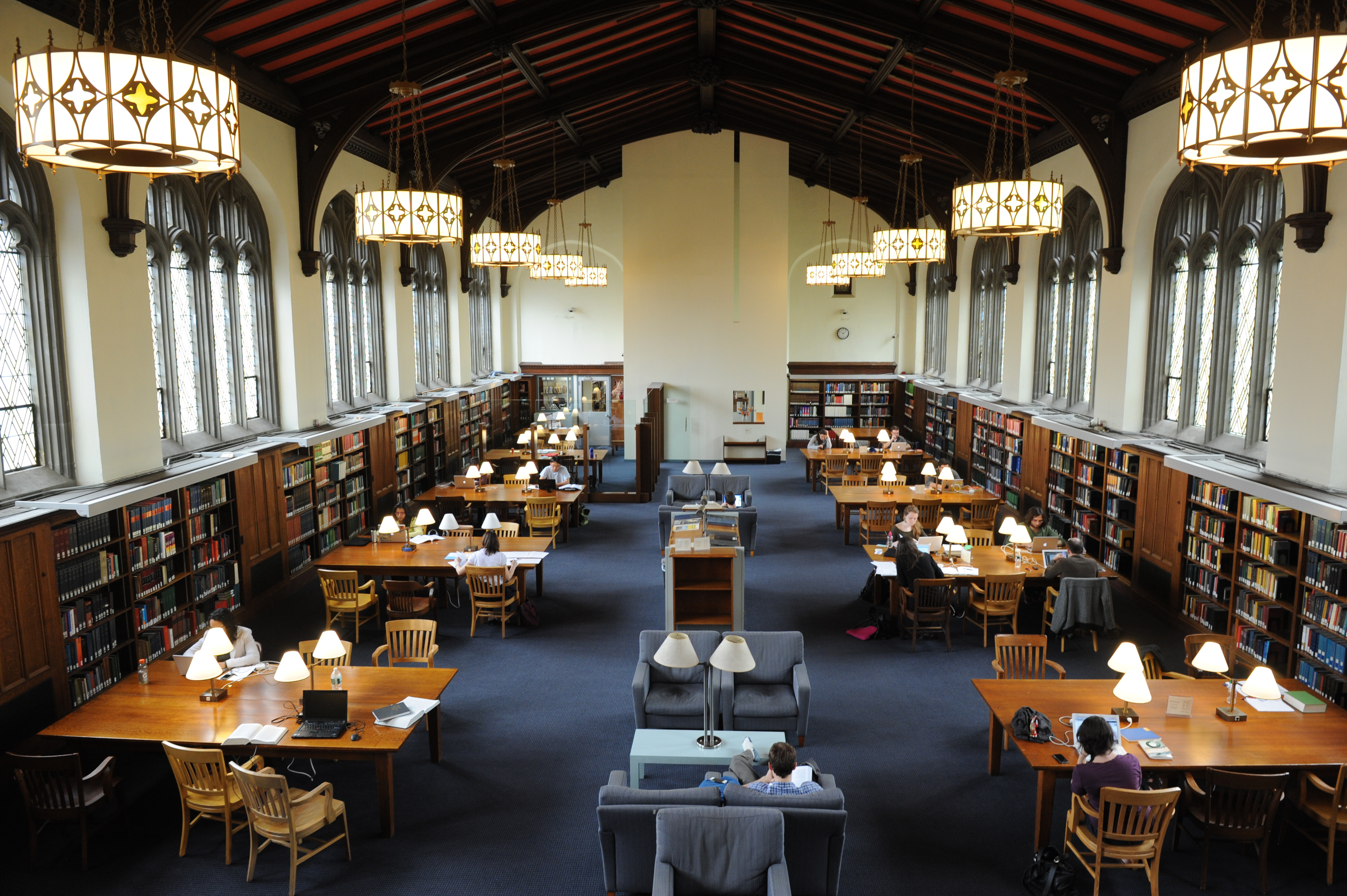
Burke Library at Union Theological Seminary

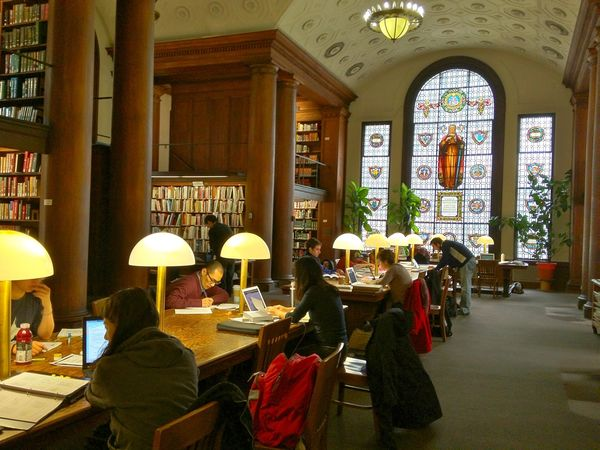
C.V. Starr East Asian Library

The libraries in the Columbia system include:

- Augustus C. Long Health Sciences Library
- Avery Architectural and Fine Arts Library
- Barnard College Library (affiliate)
- Burke Library at Union Theological Seminary
- Butler Library
- C.V. Starr East Asian Library
- Gabe M. Weiner Music & Arts Library
- Gottesman Libraries (affiliate)
- Jewish Theological Seminary Library (affiliate)
- Journalism Library
- Lehman Social Sciences Library
- Li Lu Law Library
- Mathematics Library
- Milstein Undergraduate Library
- Rare Book & Manuscript Library
- S. Steven Pan '88 Business Library
- Science & Engineering Library
- Social Work Library
- Thomas J. Watson Library of Business & Economics

== Librarians ==
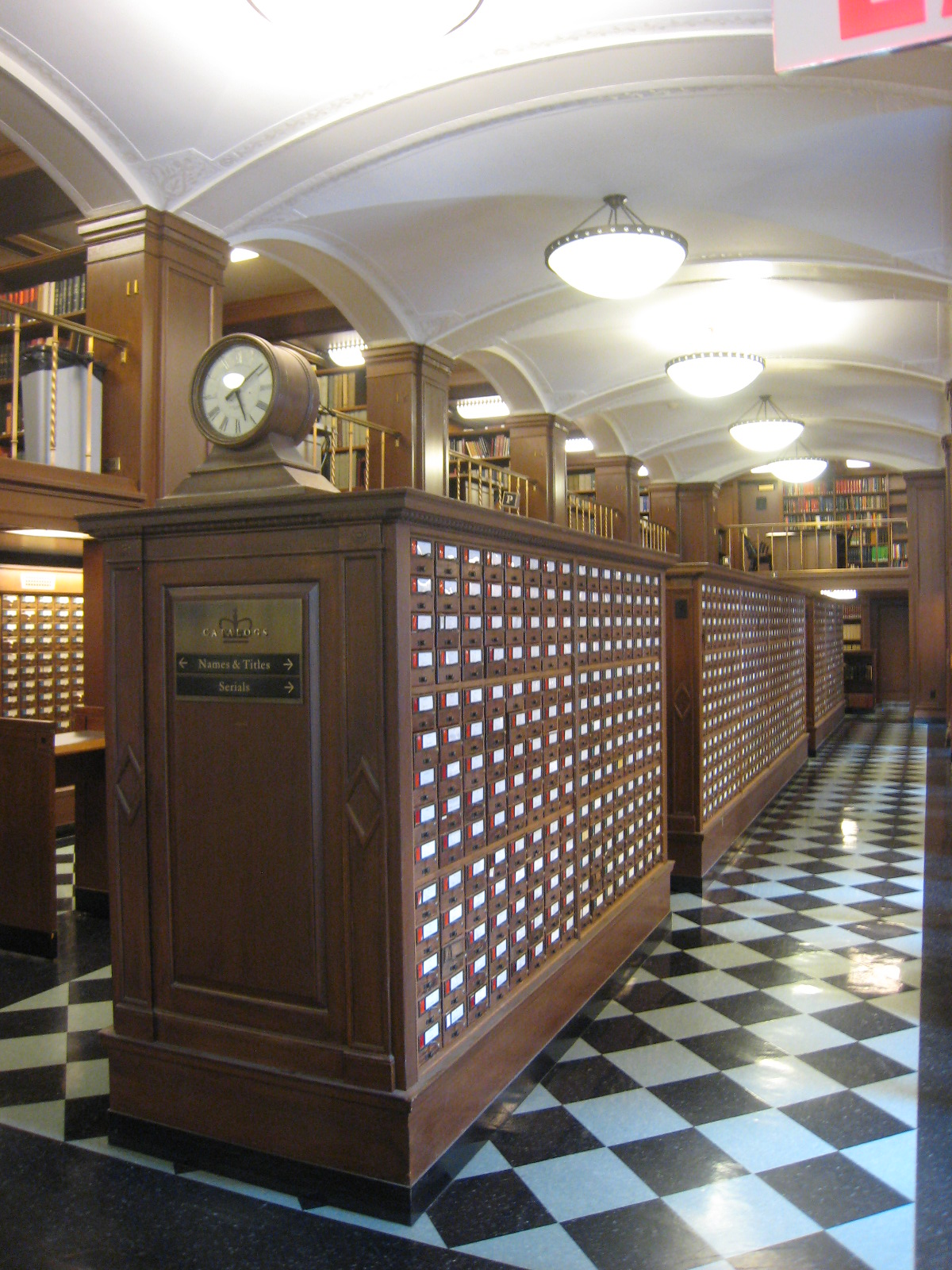
The Columbia University Libraries card catalog was one of the first to use the Dewey Decimal System, and was personally arranged by Melvil Dewey as chief librarian. CLIO, the university's online catalog, was introduced in 1985, and sections of the physical card catalog were removed in 2014.

The first recorded librarian of the Columbia Libraries was Robert Harpur, a professor of mathematics at King's College who was appointed in 1763 to "make a catalogue of the Books that now are and hereafter may belong to the Library... and also that he be accountable for the said Books." Following the Revolutionary War, during which the library was largely destroyed, the role of librarian would fall on college professors in rotation: in 1799 the board of trustees "Resolved that the care of the Library be committed to the Professor of Languages and the Professor of Mathematics and Natural Philosophy."

In order to slow the hemorrhaging of books from the library's collections, it was restructured in 1817 and 1821, when it was placed under the control of the college's president and then board of trustees, respectively. Beginning in 1817, the youngest professor of the college would serve as the librarian, including physicist and engineer James Renwick, astronomer and geologist Henry James Anderson, and adjunct professor of classics Robert George Vermilye. The first full-time librarian appointed by Columbia was classics professor Nathaniel Fish Moore in 1837; he would go on to serve as the college's president following his tenure.

List of head librarians
Name	Tenure	Notes	Ref
Robert Harpur	1763–1767		
James Renwick	1821–1825	served ex-officio as youngest professor (natural philosophy)	
Henry James Anderson	1825–1835	served ex-officio as youngest professor (mathematics and astronomy)	
Robert George Vermilye	1835–1837	served ex-officio as youngest professor (classics)	
Nathaniel Fish Moore	1837–1839		
George C. Schaeffer	1839–1847		
Lefroy Ravenhill	1847–1851		
William Alfred Jones	1851–1865		
Beverly Robinson Betts	1865–1883		
Melvil Dewey	1883–1889		
George Hall Baker	1889–1889		
James Hulme Canfield	1889–1909		
William Dawson Johnston	1909–1913		
Frederick Hicks	1914–1914		
Dean Putnam Lockwood	1915–1916	acting librarian; professor of philology	
William Henry Carpenter	1917–1925	acting librarian; provost	
Roger Howson	1926–1940	as "University Librarian"	
Charles C. Williamson	1926–1943	as "Director of Libraries" and dean of the Columbia School of Library Service	
Carl M. White	1943–1953		
Richard Logsdon	1953–1969		
Donald C. Anthony	1969–1969	acting librarian	
Warren J. Haas	1969–1978		
Patricia Battin	1978–1987		
Elaine P. Sloan	1988–2001		
James G. Neal	2001–2014		
Ann Thornton	2015–		
