= Low Memorial Library =

Building at Columbia University in Manhattan, New York

- U.S. National Register of Historic Places
- U.S. National Historic Landmark
- New York State Register of Historic Places
- New York City Landmark
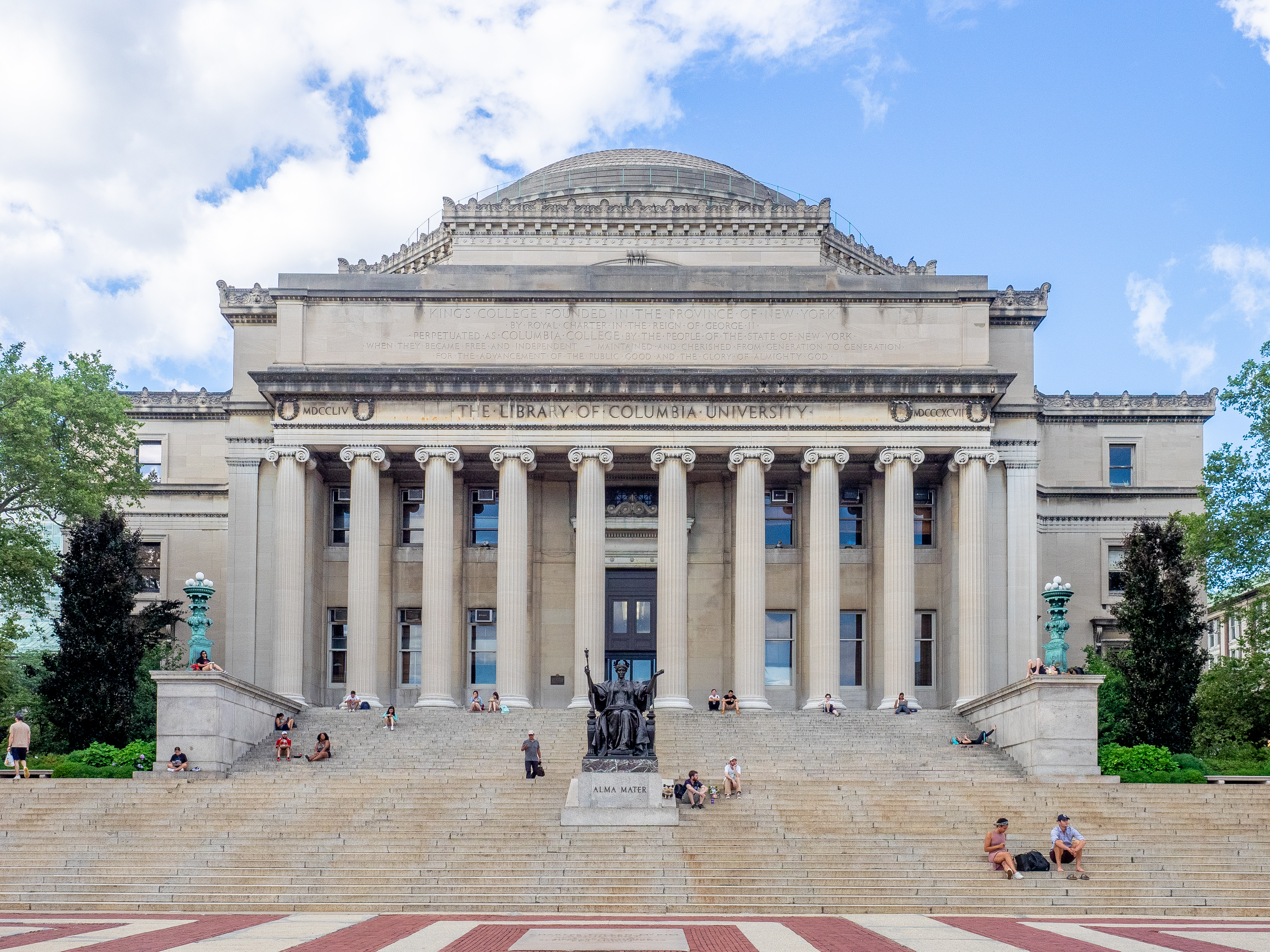
- Low Memorial Library in 2019

- Location within Manhattan Location within New York City Location within New York Location within the United States
- Location: Campus of Columbia University; Manhattan, New York, U.S.
- Coordinates: 40°48′30″N 73°57′43″W
- Built: 1894–1897
- Architect: Charles Follen McKim of McKim, Mead, and White
- Architectural style: Neoclassical
- NRHP reference No.: 87002599
- NYSRHP No.: 06101.000391
- NYCL No.: 0304, 1118

Significant dates
- Added to NRHP: December 23, 1987
- Designated NHL: December 23, 1987
- Designated NYSRHP: September 17, 1982
- Designated NYCL: Exterior: September 20, 1966; Rotunda interior: February 3, 1981

The Low Memorial Library (nicknamed Low) is a building at the center of Columbia University's campus in Upper Manhattan, New York City, U.S. The building, located near 116th Street between Broadway and Amsterdam Avenue, was designed by Charles Follen McKim of the firm McKim, Mead & White. The building was constructed between 1895 and 1897 as the university's central library, although it has contained the university's central administrative offices since 1934. Columbia University president Seth Low funded the building with $1 million (equivalent to $39 million in 2025) and named the edifice in memory of his father, Abiel Abbot Low. Low's facade and interior are New York City designated landmarks, and the building is also designated as a National Historic Landmark.

Low is arranged in the shape of a Greek cross. Three sets of stairs on the library's south side lead to a colonnade with a frieze describing its founding. The steps contain Daniel Chester French's sculpture Alma Mater, a university symbol. The library is four stories tall, excluding a ground-level basement. The building's raised first floor has an entrance vestibule, as well as an ambulatory around an octagonal rotunda, which leads to offices on the outer walls. The rotunda contains a sky-blue plaster dome and four Vermont granite columns on each of its four sides. The library's stacks could store one-and-a-half million volumes; the east wing hosted the Avery Architectural Library and the north wing hosted Columbia's law library.

The library was built as part of Columbia University's Morningside Heights campus, which was developed in the 1890s according to a master plan by McKim. When Low Library was completed, it was poorly suited for library use, becoming overcrowded from the early 20th century. Low's central location, however, made it a focal point of the university's campus. Following the completion of the much larger Butler Library in 1934, the Low Memorial Library was converted to administrative offices.

== Site ==
Low Memorial Library is at the center of Columbia University's campus in the Morningside Heights neighborhood of Upper Manhattan, New York City, U.S. The building's official address is 535 West 116th Street, though the section of 116th Street between Broadway to the west and Amsterdam Avenue to the east is part of the private College Walk. Low is raised above the northern portion of the campus, which itself is a terrace above the South Court to the south. The library building occupies the highest point of the original campus.

The building is surrounded by Miller Theatre and Lewisohn Hall to the southwest; Earl Hall to the west; Mathematics and Havemeyer Halls to the west; Uris Hall to the north; Schermerhorn, Avery, and Fayerweather Halls to the northeast; St. Paul's Chapel to the east; and Buell, Philosophy, and Kent Halls to the southeast. Earl Hall and St. Paul's Chapel are situated along the same west–east axis as Low. This arrangement is part of McKim, Mead & White's design for the campus.

=== Low Library steps ===
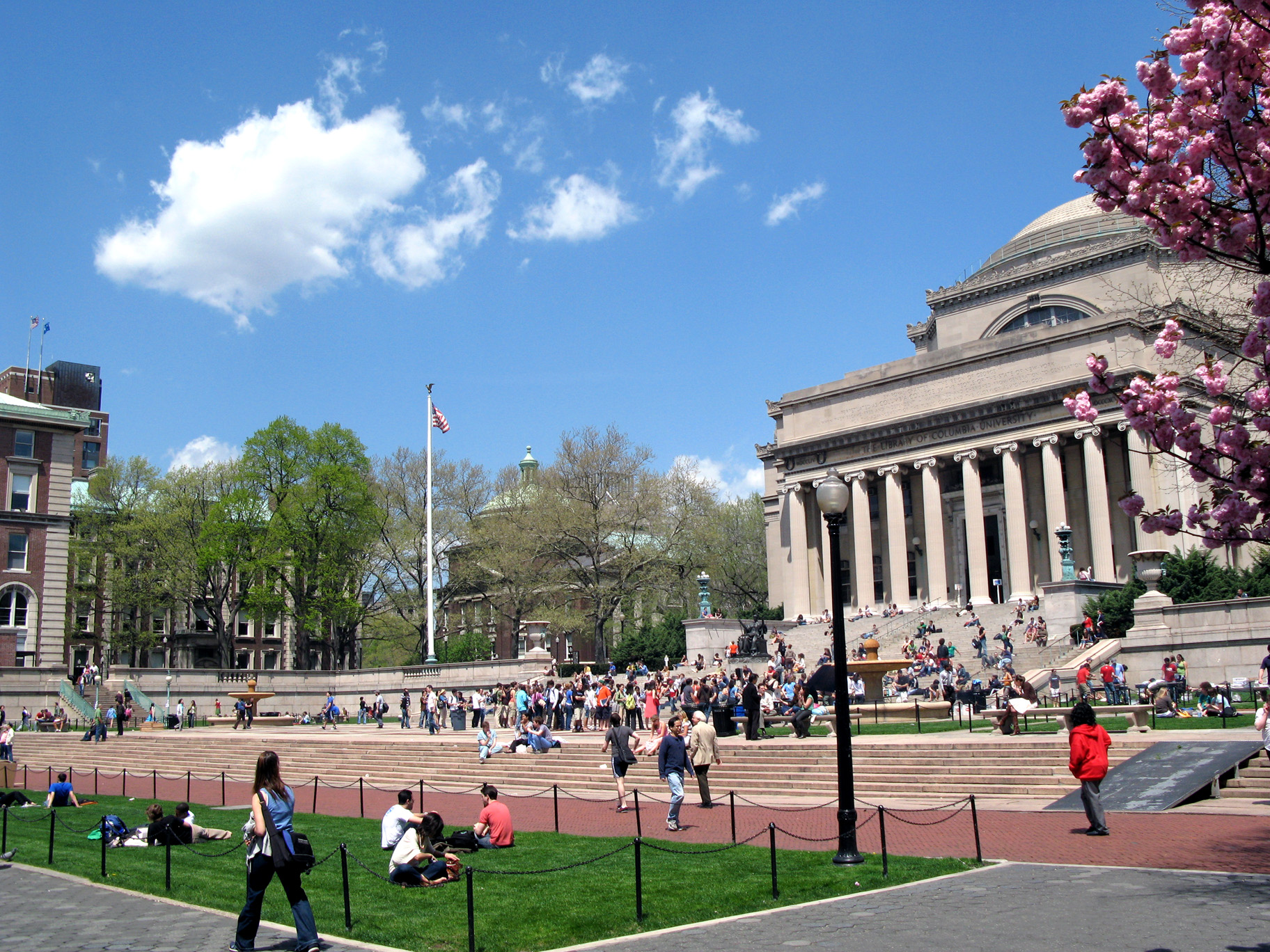
The stairs leading to Low are a popular meeting area for Columbia students and are also used for commencement, speeches, and other events.

Two flights of steps connect the terrace to the South Court; the library proper is approached by another flight above the terrace. Known as "the Steps", "Low Steps", and occasionally "Low Beach", they are a popular meeting area for Columbia students. They also serve as a connection between the northern and southern sections of Columbia's campus.

One 325-to-327 ft (99-to-100 m) wide flight leads from the South Court to an intermediate landing, and a narrower, 134-to-140 ft (41-to-43 m) leads from the intermediate landing to the terrace. The narrower flight itself has an intermediate landing containing Alma Mater, a sculpture by Daniel Chester French that depicts a woman, personifying the traditional image of the university as an alma mater. Hidden in the statue's leg is an owl symbolizing knowledge and learning; according to college superstition, the first member of the incoming class to find the owl will become class valedictorian. The centers of the stairs are slightly curved upward to remove the impression they were sagging. As a result, the center of each step is about 3.5 in (8.9 cm) taller than the extreme ends. Smaller sets of staircases connect the intermediate landing to passages at terrace level on the west and east.

Architecture critic Paul Goldberger said of the steps in 1987: "The building itself, for all the power of its immense scale and huge dome, seems almost to recede, deferring to the stairs before it." During Columbia University commencement ceremonies, Columbia's "graduation mace" is customarily carried down the stairs. The stairs have been used for other speeches, such as a 1991 speech by novelist Salman Rushdie after the Iranian government targeted him for assassination.

== Architecture ==
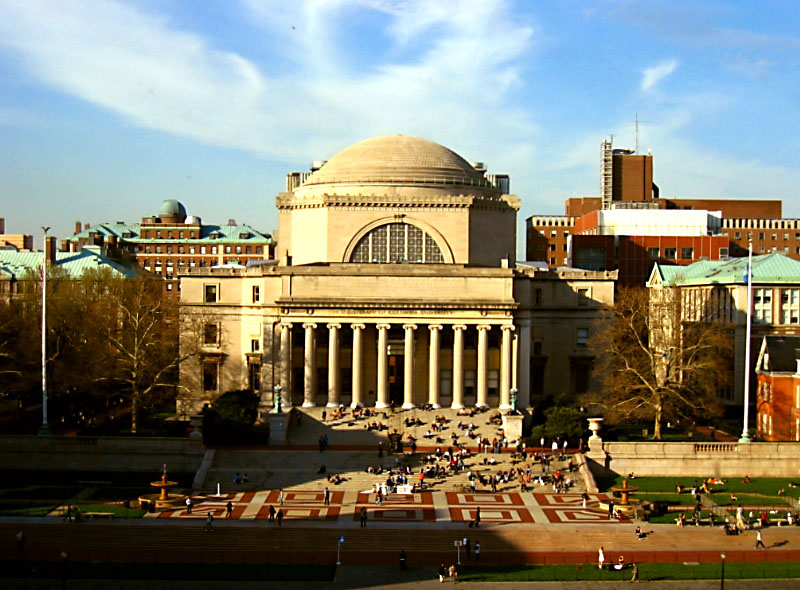
South elevation, from the upper stories of Butler Library

The Low Memorial Library was designed by Charles Follen McKim of McKim, Mead & White and was built between 1894 and 1897. McKim was assisted in the design by William M. Kendall, Austin W. Lord, and Egerton Swartwout. The library was designed in the Neoclassical style, incorporating many elements of Rome's Pantheon and Baths of Caracalla. It was funded by Seth Low, the president of Columbia University and later the mayor of New York City, in memory of his father Abiel Abbot Low.

=== Form ===
Low is arranged in the shape of a Greek cross, is aligned with the Manhattan street grid, and contains beveled corners. The main walls of the building's Greek cross correspond to the four cardinal directions. The cross has a maximum width of 192 ft (59 m). The Greek cross layout had previously been used in several libraries, including the main library of New York University's (NYU) Bronx campus (now Gould Memorial Library on the campus of Bronx Community College) that was designed by McKim's colleague Stanford White. Low's arrangement, like that of Gould's, is partly inspired by those of the Library of Congress and the British Library. Unlike these other libraries, Low faces away from much of the campus that was built around it.

The building is topped by a round dome made of brick, which is clad on the outside with limestone, and on the inside with steel framing and plaster. The dome has a radius of 52 ft (16 m) and a maximum thickness of 48 in (120 cm) at the bottom, tapering to 9 in (23 cm) at the pinnacle. The steel frame under the dome is made of two 1 in (2.5 cm) thick and 12 in (30 cm) wide steel bars. The ceiling of the rotunda beneath is a false ceiling that hangs about 16 ft (4.9 m) below the inner face of the dome. Otherwise, the dome is made of stone that is designed to be self-supporting. The dome was inspired by the Rotunda, the main library designed by Thomas Jefferson at the University of Virginia, and is also less directly evocative of the dome above the Pantheon.

=== Facade ===
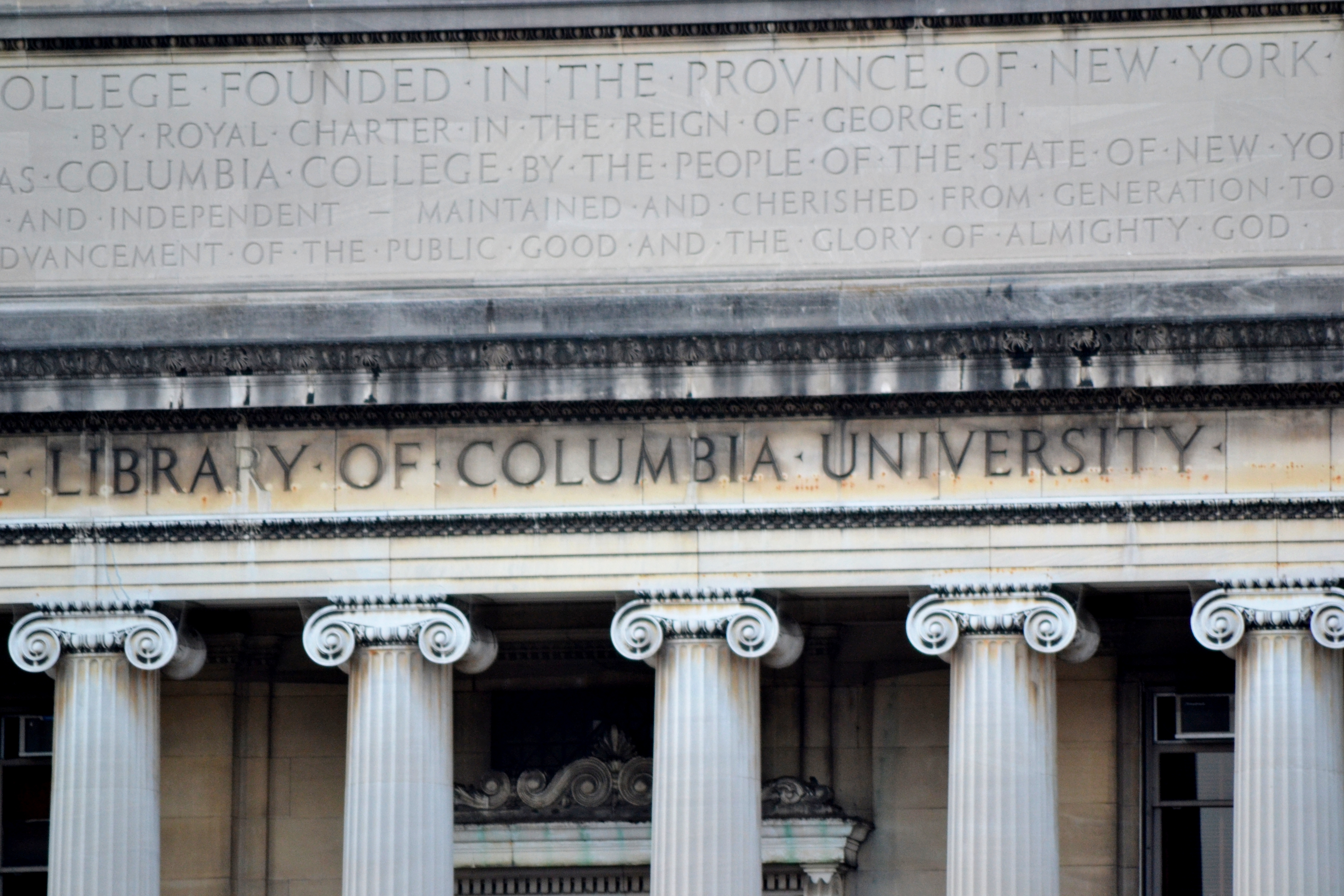
Frieze inscription

The 12 ft (3.7 m) high base of Low is made of granite. An 86 ft (26 m) wide staircase with 22 or 26 steps leads from the terrace to the main entrance portico on the building's south facade. The highest step, the stylobate of the portico, corresponds to the top of the base. The entrance portico consists of an Ionic-style colonnade of ten columns supporting a cornice and attic. Each of the columns is 35 ft (11 m) tall and has a diameter of 4 ft (1.2 m). The frieze above the columns reads: "Library of Columbia University". An inscription above the colonnade describes the university's founding. It reads:

King's College Founded in the Province of New York
By Royal Charter in the Reign of George II
Perpetuated as Columbia College by the People of the State of New York
When They Became Free and Independent
Maintained and Cherished from Generation to Generation
For the Advancement of the Public Good and the Glory of Almighty God

The building was designed with 150 windows, the smallest of which measures 10 by 4 ft (3.0 by 1.2 m). The upper section of the facade is clad in limestone, in contrast with the surrounding buildings, which are generally made of brick with limestone trim. The west, north, and east walls are designed with pilasters similar in design to the colonnade; the pilasters flank windows that are deeply set into the facade. The corners of the Greek cross also have deeply set windows. The roof of the Greek cross's "arms" is about 70 ft (21 m) above the ground level of the terrace.

Above the top of the cross, Low's walls, which rise to 100 ft (30 m) above the surrounding terrace, are arranged as an octagonal drum supporting the dome. Each of the four main walls has large, half-round windows that are either 44 or 50 ft (13 or 15 m) across and 22 ft (6.7 m) high, and are evocative of the lunettes atop the Baths of Caracalla. The top of the dome is around 135 ft (41 m) above terrace level and 152 ft (46 m) above the grade of what was formerly 116th Street.

=== Features ===
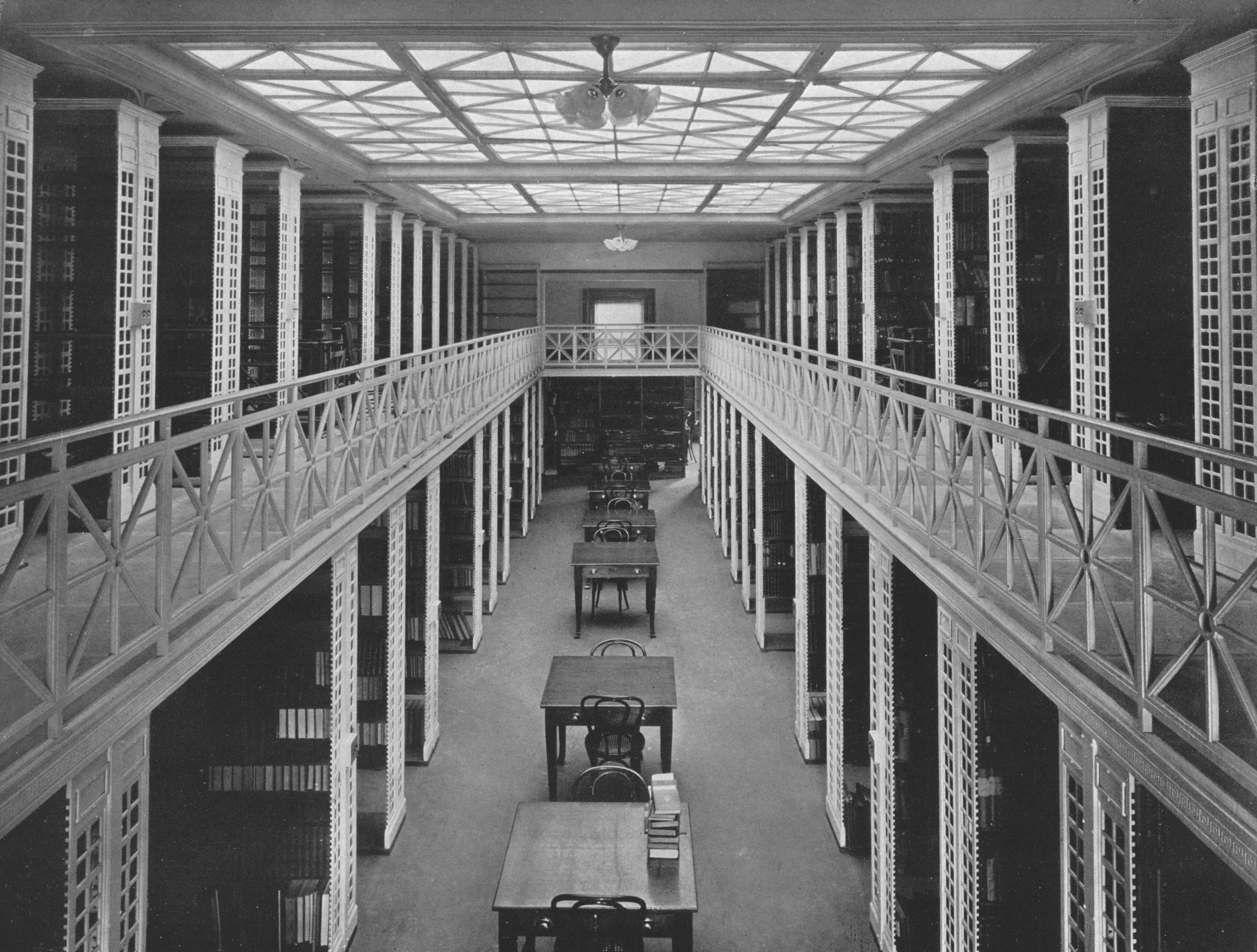
Stacks in a third floor seminar room, 1915

Low has four stories. The ground level is a raised basement while the first floor is one story above ground. The first floor's interior consists of an entrance vestibule on the south side of the building that leads to an ambulatory surrounding a central rotunda. Low's first floor shares design influences with the reading room at the Library of Congress's Thomas Jefferson Building, the Administration Building at the World's Columbian Exposition, and the nearby Grant's Tomb. The second floor had a gallery on the south arm and closed stacks on the north, east, and west arms. The third floor was devoted entirely to lecture rooms.

The library's stacks were built to store one-and-a-half million volumes. Graduate students used the open stacks and adjacent small reading rooms while undergraduates could use only the closed stacks, using the rotunda as a central reading room. Eighteen small reading rooms were provided. Elmer E. Garnsey was hired to create the library's interior color scheme. As of 2010, the exhibition space in the building is open to the public from 9:00 a.m. to 5:30 p.m. Columbia students, staff, and faculty can book the spaces on the first floor for events. (Note: According to Columbia University's website, the Faculty Room, Burden Room, Rotunda, and Trustees' Room on the first story above ground are denoted as being on the "second floor". This considers the ground floor as the "first floor".)

==== Vestibule, president's room, and trustees' room ====
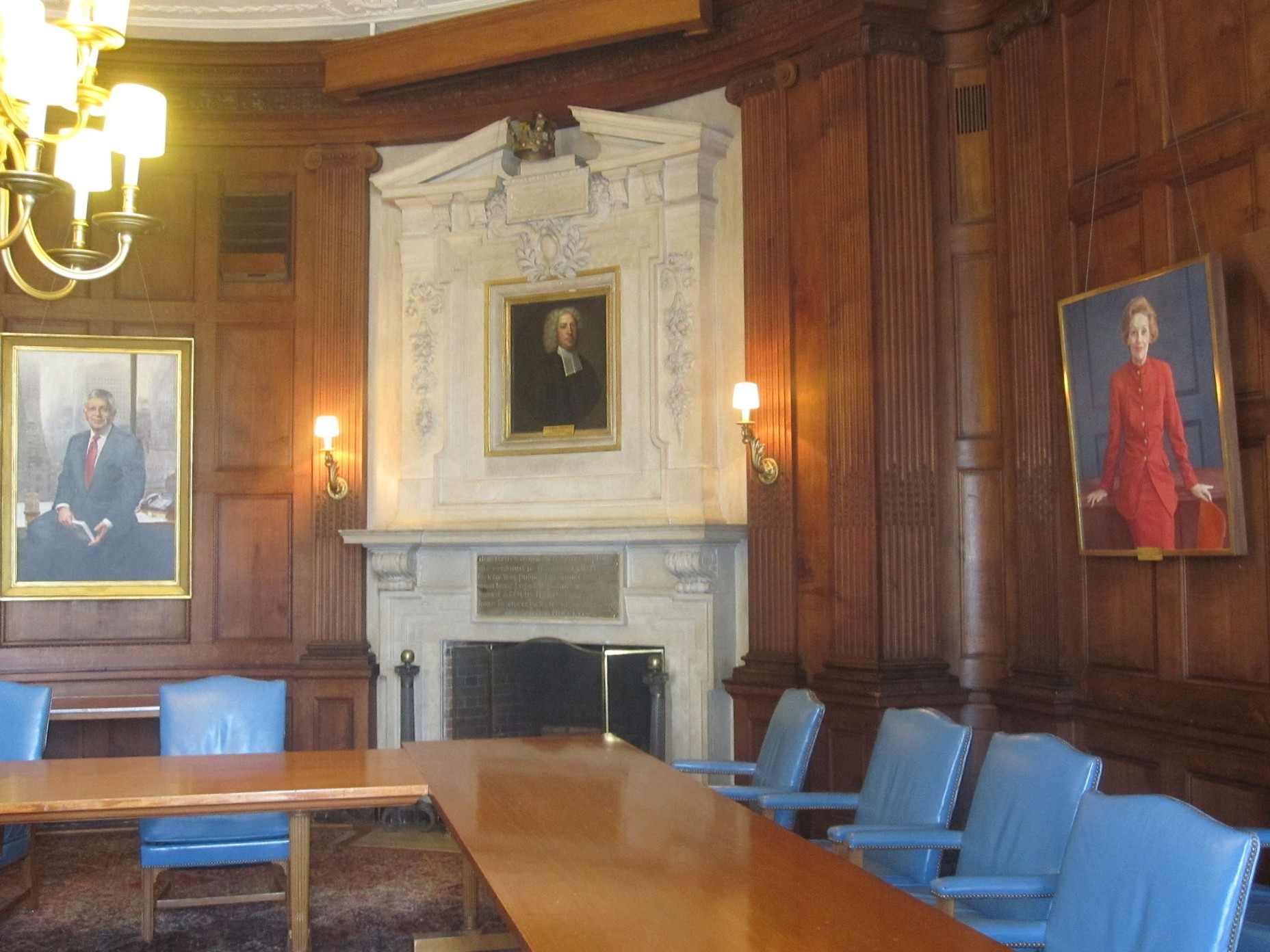
Trustees' room

Low's main entrance contains bronze and glass entrance doors leading to a double-height vestibule measuring 30 by 33 ft (9.1 by 10.1 m). The original doors were made of oak; McKim had proposed bronze doors be used but Low rejected the doors as "out of harmony with our ideals and with the ideals of my father". At the entryway are bronze busts of Zeus and Apollo. The vestibule has a marble floor with red, rust, beige, and gray panels in an octagonal arrangement. George W. Maynard sculpted eight panels with bronze reliefs depicting the twelve zodiac signs; the panels were manufactured by John Williams and displayed at the World's Columbian Exposition, after which they were donated to Columbia University. The vestibule contains a white marble bust of Pallas Athena, which is modeled after Minerve du Collier at the Louvre.

Oak doors on the west and east link to sets of four marble steps, which connect to the former offices of the president and the trustees, respectively. Above these doors are stone architraves with molded leaf-and-dart motifs and lintels with paneling. On either side of the doors are double-height limestone pilasters with gilded capitals. Several portraits were hung in each room. The trustees' room to the east was decorated by the Herter Brothers and has oak paneling. The center of the trustees' room has a Georgian-style fireplace mantel, which contains a broken pediment holding an iron crown from King's College, the predecessor of Columbia University. The mantel has a cornerstone from King's College's original building and a portrait of the college's founding president Samuel Johnson.

The rest of the vestibule's walls have plaster panels bordered by green-and-gold acanthus-leaf motifs, and band courses with Greek fretwork. Each corner of the vestibule has a pilaster similar to those flanking the west and east doors, as well as a wrought-iron lamp. The south wall has a narrow balcony illuminated by a lattice of crossbars; the north wall is a double window above a set of four steps leading to the rotunda. Laurel leaves and medallions divide the vestibule's ceiling into nine coffers. The central coffer has a bronze lantern above the Pallas Athena bust.

==== Ambulatory ====
The ambulatory is an octagonal hallway around the rotunda consisting of alternating long and short passages; the long passages correspond to the cardinal directions while the shorter passages correspond to the intercardinal directions. The floor has alternating marble squares and circles that are laid in hues of red, yellow, and black-and-white. At the floor's center is a bronze bas-relief of the university's seal.

The walls of the long passages have Doric-style limestone pilasters and orange plaster panels, bordered by leaf motifs and band course like those in the vestibule. There are also oak panels that correspond to the rotunda's former bookcases. The south hallway contains a pair of green, double-height, Connemara marble columns that screen it from the entrance vestibule. The columns, each of which weighs 25 short tons (22 long tons; 23 t), were quarried from the largest blocks of Connemara marble available when the library was built. The ceiling of the south hallway is divided into five coffers and a bronze lamp hangs from the outermost coffer on either side. The west, north, and east hallways have similar ceilings but are illuminated by three bronze lanterns. The north hall has a balcony while the south and east halls have gates to the rotunda.

Offices and additional libraries surrounded the ambulatory. At the center of the outer walls of the west, north, and east hallways are double wooden doors that lead to offices. Formerly, these doorways led to catalogue and specialized libraries. The doors on the east hall led to the Avery Architectural Library while the north hall's doors led to the law library. The Avery Architectural Library's ceiling beams bore inscriptions of architects' names. The west hall's doors led to the administrative offices, and the west wing contained the periodical, catalogue, and delivery rooms. The periodical room measured 61 by 37 ft (19 by 11 m) and had a two-story-high ceiling. There was also an exhibition room measuring 39 by 54 ft (12 by 16 m).

Decoration in the short passages is simple: The unornamented walls are made of plaster and have arched, recessed doorways flanked by simple pilasters. The halls have arched ceilings and are illuminated by bronze lamps on marble pedestals, below which are lions' heads and above which are glass globes. Staircases rise to the upper levels, which are adjacent to each of the short sections of the ambulatory.

==== Rotunda ====
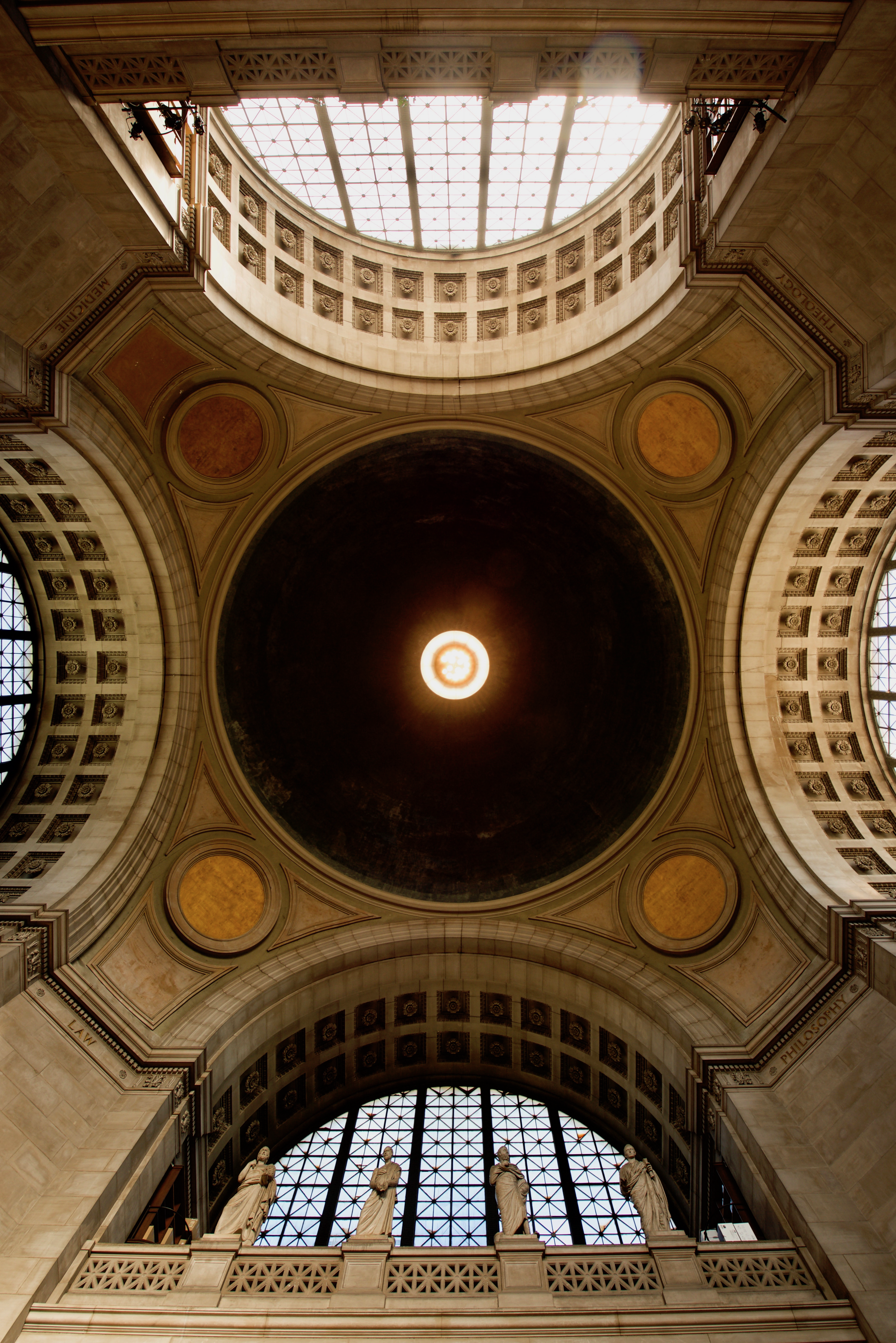
Underside of dome

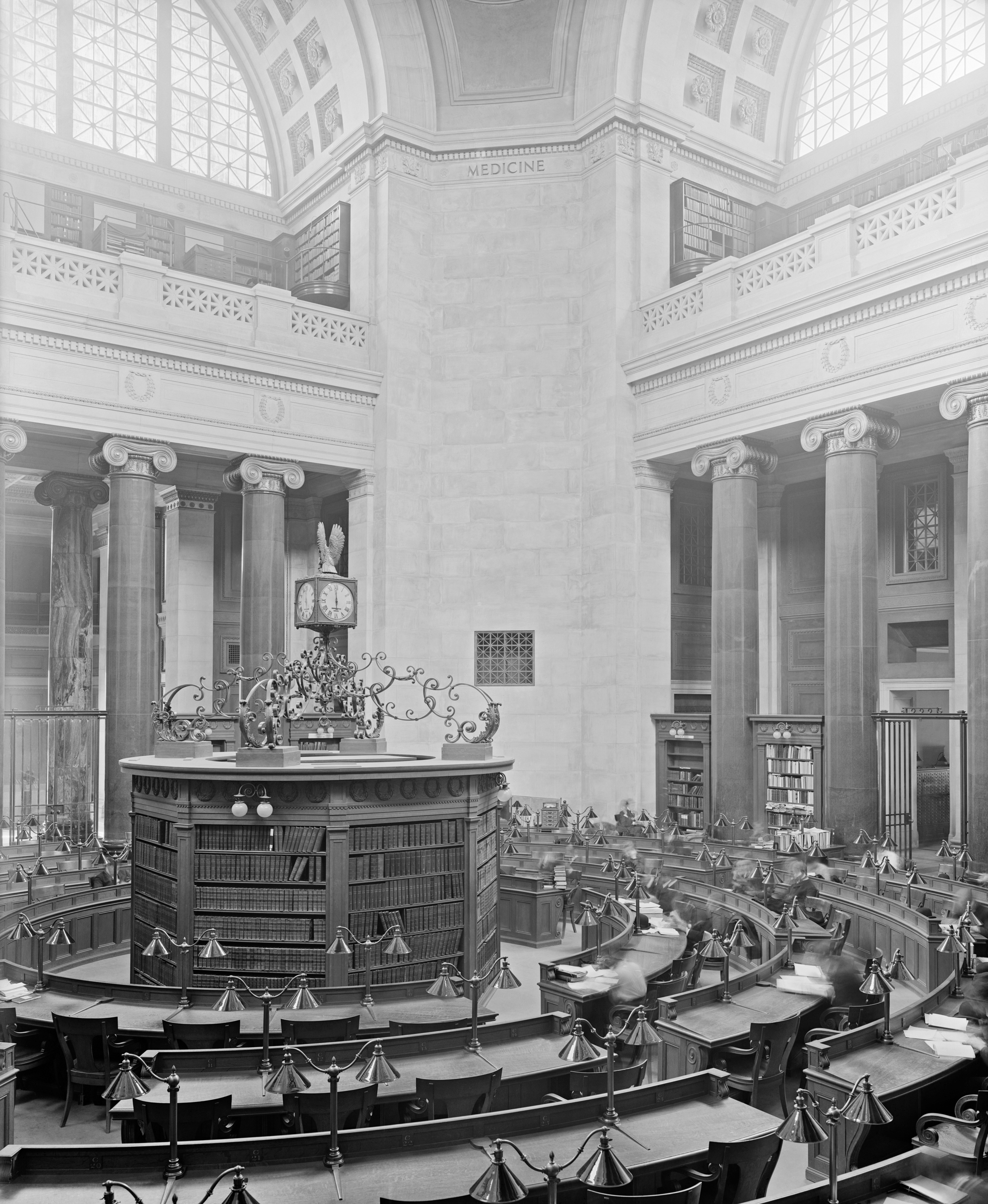
Seen c. 1900–1910

After 1934, the building was converted to administrative use and the rotunda became a ceremonial space.

The center of Low's first floor contains an octagonal rotunda, the library's former reading room. The rotunda has four long walls corresponding to the cardinal directions and four short walls corresponding to the intercardinal directions. (Note: According to an 1898 Scientific American article, the "short diameter" between the longer walls is 75 ft (23 m) while the "long diameter" between the shorter walls was 85 ft (26 m). According to a 1923 guidebook, the short diameter is 73 ft (22 m).) The reading room contained circular tables, each of which was lit by a reading lamp. The reading room's seats were arranged in four concentric rings. Four columns adjoined a reference desk at the center of the rotunda. Above the columns was a decorative iron structure topped by a four-sided clock with a bronze sculpture of an eagle.

Each of the rotunda's main walls includes four Vermont granite columns with gilt-bronze, Ionic-style capitals that screen the rotunda from the ambulatory. Each column is 29 ft (8.8 m) tall, supporting a third-story balcony, and each of the capitals weighs almost one ton. Vermont marble was chosen because it closely resembles Connemara marble, which could not be used for the rotunda due to the scarcity of large pieces of that material. Bookcases rising to eye level were originally laced between the columns to give the impression of an enclosed space. Depictions of Roman and Greek luminaries Demosthenes, Euripides, Sophocles, and Augustus Caesar are placed on the balcony along the north wall. McKim personally funded he figure of Euripides. Twelve figures were planned for the other walls but these figures were never built.

The corners of the rotunda have large, limestone piers that serve as pendentives for the rotunda's ceiling; the piers contain gold circles and have internal ducts. Inscriptions of the medieval sciences of Law, Philosophy, Medicine, and Theology decorate the piers. The tops of the pendentives are beveled. The rotunda's piers also support vaults on each of the building's main walls, which include half-round windows. During daylight hours, the lunette windows atop the walls provided sufficient illumination.

The rotunda's ceiling is 105.5 ft (32.2 m) tall and 73 ft (22 m) across. The ceiling is a false dome made of plaster over steel mesh and is painted sky blue. The false dome's ribs are spaced four ft (1.2 m) apart at the springing of the arches. A sphere that reflected light from eight spotlight beams on the room's third-floor balconies at night was suspended from the ceiling. The globe was intended to resemble the moon. The sphere was seven ft (2.1 m) across and hung from a steel, one-quarter in (6.4 mm) thick wire, giving the impression it floated in midair. It is not known whether the spotlights were ever used for their intended purpose but the sphere has since been removed.

==== Other stories ====
A sub-basement contained heating and ventilating apparatus, and a storage room. There are doors at each of the basement's four corners. When the Low Memorial Library was operating as a library, students generally used these doors to enter the building because they were convenient entrances from the campus grounds. The basement had cloak rooms, the office of the superintendent of buildings and grounds, a sub-post office, a telegraph office, and telephone booths. It also contained a portion of the stacks, which could store 150,000 volumes. A separate stack room served the law library in the north wing, to which it was connected by stairs.

The law library occupied the entire north wing, and the north side of the second story contained law collections. The east side had social sciences collections, with the Columbiana collection on the northeast corner and modern-language collections on the west side. The south wing, which is the top of the entrance vestibule, has only a balcony. The third-story balconies formerly held the open stacks, which were used by graduate students. The gallery stacks held 16,000 volumes. The third floor had history and philosophy collections, offices, workrooms, and 10 lecture halls. The layout of the second and third stories allowed different specialties to have seminar areas and private study rooms near the stacks corresponding to their subjects.

== History ==
In 1890, through his family's wealth and social connections, Seth Low became Columbia University's president. The university's campus, which at the time was in Midtown Manhattan, was quickly becoming cramped. In April 1892, Columbia University acquired the former site of the Bloomingdale Insane Asylum between Broadway, Amsterdam Avenue, and 116th and 120th Streets in Morningside Heights. The next month, Low hired Charles Follen McKim, Charles C. Haight, and Richard Morris Hunt as consultants to plan a new campus on the newly acquired site. Low wanted the consultants to collaborate but the process became an architectural design competition in practice, with each architect preparing multiple plans in different styles. In April 1893 the architects presented their findings to the trustees. Columbia ultimately hired McKim to design the new Morningside Heights campus in late 1893. McKim was a relatively inexperienced architect at the time, but he had endowed a fellowship to the Columbia School of Architecture three years prior.

=== Development ===
==== Planning ====
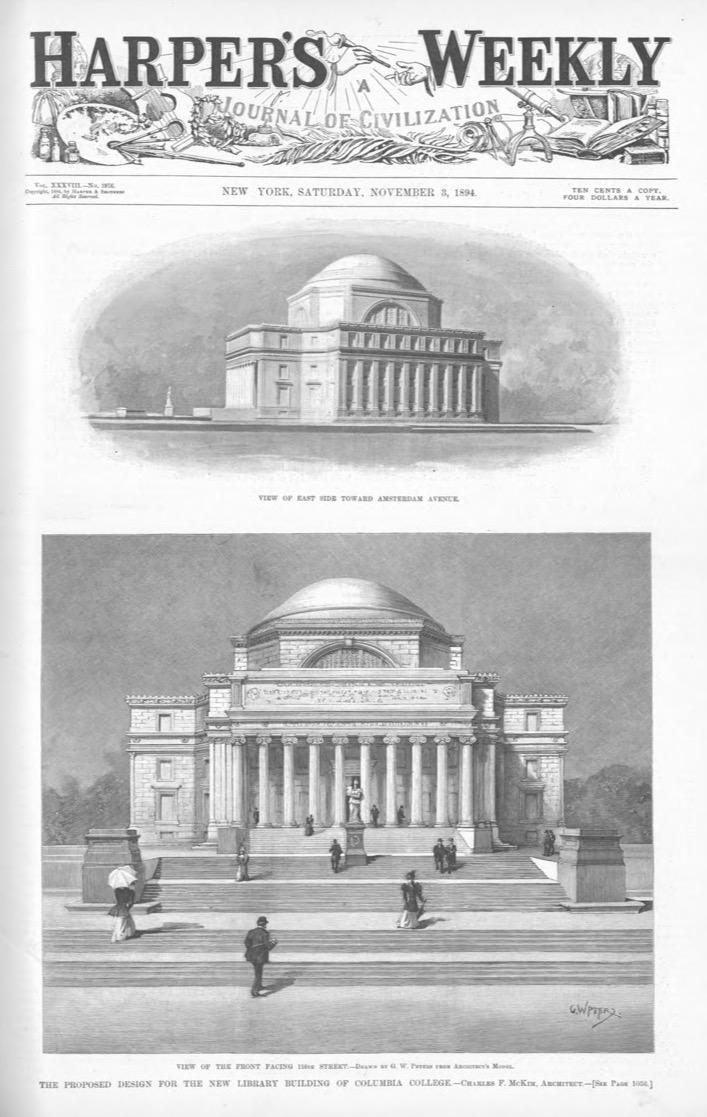
The final plan for Low Library, published in Harper's Weekly in 1894 on the eve of the building's construction

The center of the site was higher than its surroundings, leading McKim to develop a classical-style campus around the highest point. Columbia's trustees approved the first iteration of McKim's campus plan in April or May 1894; the plan had a rectangular library building surrounded on either side by symmetrical rows of buildings. The library was to be built at the center of the campus, facing south toward a main entrance on 116th Street; there would also be a court to the north, an assembly hall to the west, and a chapel to the east. In this plan, the pathways around the library were too narrow and the assembly hall, library, and chapel appeared to form a wall dividing the campus's north and south halves. Consequently, the plans underwent further refinement through mid-1894. McKim, working with his colleagues Kendall, Lord, and Swartwout, considered circular and octagonal layouts for the library before deciding on a cruciform layout.

In July 1894 McKim wrote to his partner William Rutherford Mead saying though "the scheme for the Library has undergone many changes", he and his colleagues had devised a suitable revised plan. The library would be placed on the site's highest point with a dome 300 ft (91 m) above the water level of the nearby Hudson River, and would be surrounded by the other buildings on campus. To make the library stand out, McKim designed a grand stairway for the 116th Street frontage. The assembly hall and chapel were moved from the library to the west and east, creating small courtyards on either side. Seth Low had contemplated whether the other buildings should be ornately decorated so the trustees could approve of the design but McKim believed the library should have a simple-yet-grand style. The trustees approved this proposal, under which the library would cost $700,000 (equivalent to $26 million in 2025), in November 1894. Later that month a model of the library was exhibited at the American Fine Arts Society.

After plans for the library were approved, the trustees received bids for the construction of the library and surrounding buildings. At the time, Columbia had sufficient funds to construct a few buildings but not the library. In May 1895 the construction contract was awarded to Norcross Brothers. A few days after the construction contract was awarded, Seth Low donated $1 million (equivalent to $39 million in 2025) to the library in memory of his father, Abiel Abbot Low. In exchange, the library would be named the Low Memorial Library. The donation reportedly comprised a third of Seth Low's fortune. News media profusely praised the donation, which was reported for several days on the front pages of the city's newspapers. McKim thanked president Low for the donation: "If, when the Library building shall be completed, your confidence in our firm prove to not have been misplaced, I shall regard [the library] one of the greatest happinesses of my life."

==== Construction ====
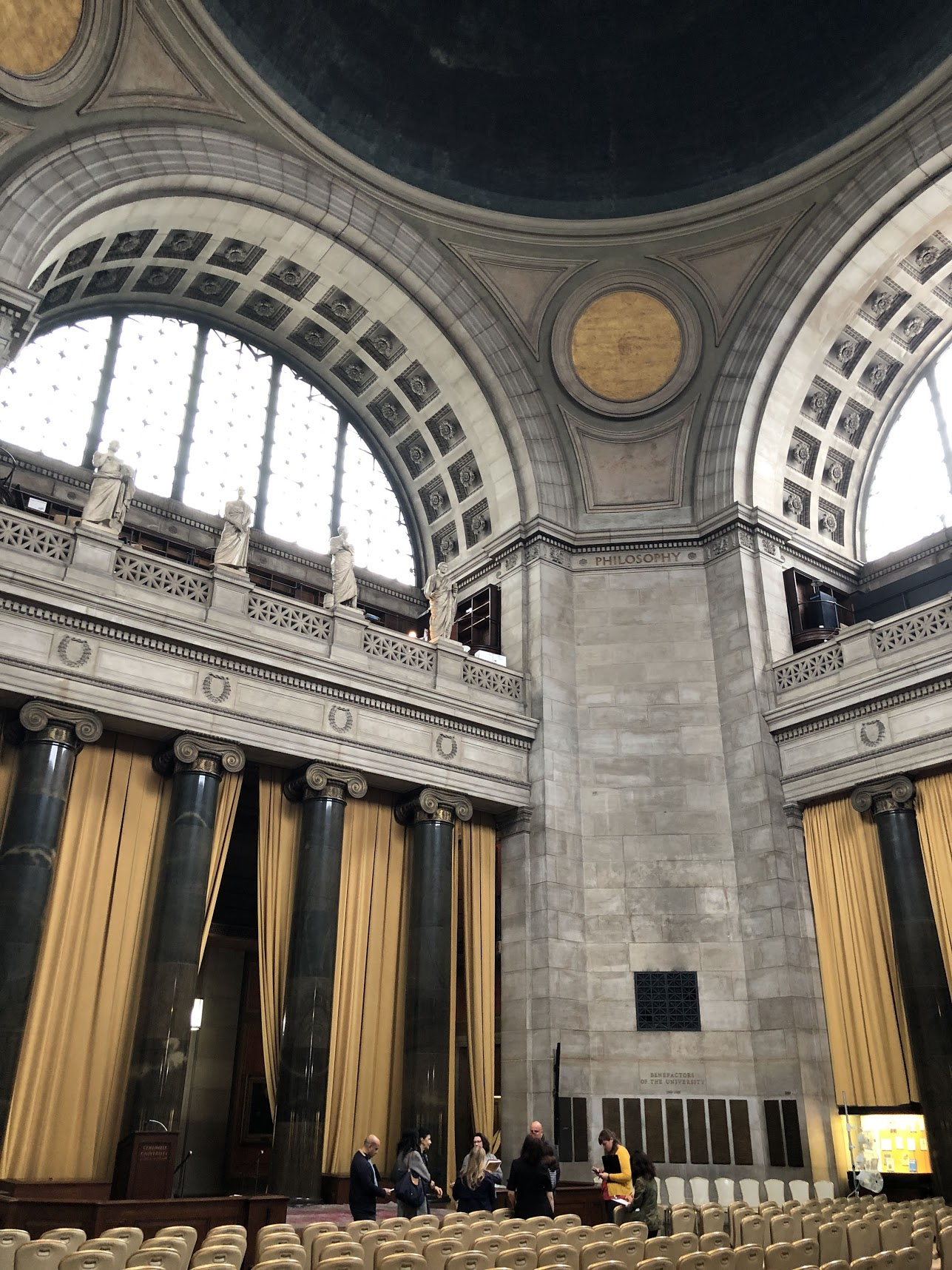
Modern view of the rotunda

Seth Low asked McKim to draw designs for a library with a facade of marble, limestone, or brick and limestone. The initial plans called for a marble facade but Low had been hesitant to use such an expensive material, preferring instead to use brick for the library. McKim had wanted to use limestone, a material with a "monumental character". Construction had started by June 18, 1895. Initial work included excavation of the library's foundation. Seth Low wished to hold a cornerstone-laying ceremony in late 1895, but he postponed these plans after the groundbreaking for NYU's Gould Library that October – he did not want to hold a similar event in such close succession. The Low Library's cornerstone was informally laid on December 7, 1895.

Construction of the library was delayed by disagreements over the dome's design. When the walls were being constructed, McKim had planned to create the dome using concrete carried on iron trusses with limestone cladding. Columbia's architecture departmental head William Robert Ware argued such a design would not be "a real dome". McKim then proposed a Guastavino tile dome, to which Ware agreed. The Norcross Brothers then proposed an un-reinforced concrete dome they had planned themselves and McKim submitted plans to the New York City Department of Buildings (DOB). The DOB delayed issuing the permit until November 1895, likely in part because of the uncertainties over the new design. By then, the architects feared cold weather would weaken the concrete, forcing the dome to be deferred until the following spring. Consequently, the dome was made of brick with an inner surface of metal lath and plaster, and a limestone exterior. The site of Columbia University's new campus was officially dedicated on May 2, 1896, by which time work on the library was rapidly progressing.

Seth Low had wanted all the library's columns to be made of Connemara marble, but because of their large diameters only two columns of that size could be quarried with the material available. NYU had purchased sixteen narrower Connemara marble columns for its own library; its architect, McKim's partner Stanford White, boasted about how Columbia's library had been unable to secure the same material. Columbia's two Connemara marble columns were placed at the entrance to the vestibule, where they were most prominent, and Vermont marble was used for the rest. An issue about inscriptions for the exterior friezes, which Low started to discuss at the end of 1896, arose. He devised some ideas for inscriptions during mid-1897, suggesting to McKim the inscriptions should describe Columbia's history. The Columbia trustees disagreed on whether such inscriptions should be in English or Latin, as well as their locations. Ultimately, they gave McKim permission only for the inscription above the main entrance. In June 1897 Columbia's existing library closed for three months for the relocation of the collection.

=== Use as a library ===
==== Early years ====
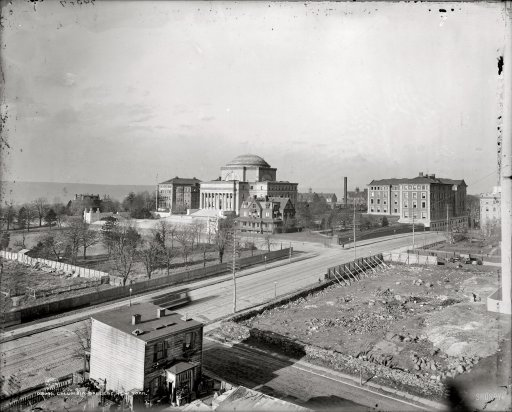
Low Library was not yet complete when the new Columbia University campus opened on October 4, 1897.

The new Columbia University campus opened on October 4, 1897. The opening was marked with a small ceremony in the library's reading room, during which Seth Low announced his resignation. Low Library was not completed at the time; the power plant and other mechanical systems were not in operation, and the final details were still being installed through 1898. From its opening, the building served both as a library and as the university's administrative office. The library could store 450,000 volumes in its stacks. Additional space on the third floor was being temporarily allocated to Columbia's political science and philosophy departments, which were expected to relocate to dedicated quarters some time in the future, freeing space for another 600,000 volumes.

University officials believed the new library was sufficient to accommodate the university's collection, which in 1896 contained 215,000 volumes and was adding 12,000 volumes annually. The campus had 1,353 students across all programs in 1898, and the library was expected to easily accommodate all these students. The collection grew much more quickly after the opening of the Morningside Heights campus, reaching 300,000 volumes by 1900. The following year, a university pamphlet said the library was open on weekdays between 8:30 a.m. and 11:00 p.m., and the library closed one hour earlier from July to September. At the time, the library had about 10,000 volumes in the general reading room, as well as 310,000 bound volumes and many pamphlets in the stacks. The steps outside the library became a meeting area for Columbia undergraduates in the early years of the campus. In 1903 the Alma Mater sculpture was installed on the steps leading to the library.

==== Overcrowding ====
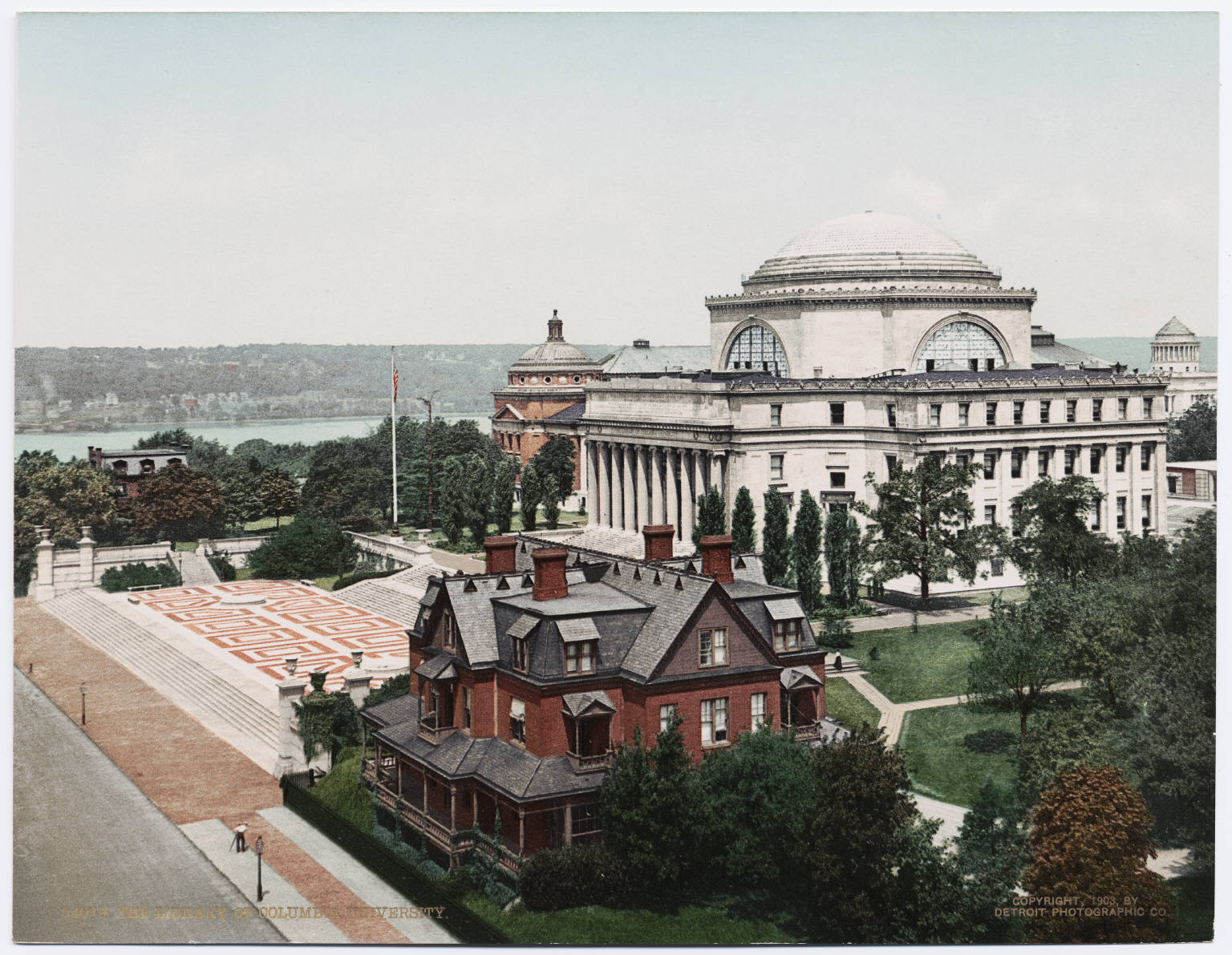
Low Library, c. 1902–05

The collection was organized in a compartmentalized manner, and departments expanded at different rates, causing problems for the building's operation as a library. Nicholas Murray Butler, who had replaced Seth Low as university president, was observing crowded conditions at the library by 1902; according to American Architect magazine, "One or two utilitarian points have been rather sacrificed." In addition, the calling of books from the stacks was difficult. The 10,000 ft-long (3,000 m) pneumatic tube delivery system stopped working two weeks after it was installed, and a dumbwaiter system had also broken down. The crowding increased in later years because the political science and philosophy departments did not move as scheduled, and because of increased enrollment – the university had 4,225 students by 1914. The overcrowding was slightly alleviated in 1910 when the law collection was relocated to the newly built Kent Hall. Avery Hall opened two years later; by then, the Avery Architectural Library had also outgrown its space at Low. The increasing overcrowding led Columbia's newspaper to say in a 1924 article: "'Library' is a misnomer for an edifice designed for the benefit of sightseers."

In a 1921 report, Butler said: "Pressure upon the Library of the University has become such as well nigh to paralyze it." In that year's university's annual report, Butler suggested a library could be created in University Hall, the completion of which had been delayed for years. A 1923 guidebook reported: "The room seats 152 readers, 15,000 reference volumes arranged on the shelves. The library contains in all about 835,000 volumes, beside pamphlets, manuscripts, and 50,000 doctoral dissertations." The following August, Charles C. Williamson, who was appointed Dean of the Columbia School of Library Service in 1926, wrote to Butler suggesting the creation of a new library. Williamson said in his letter: "A condition has been reached which threatens to hamper the growth and development of the University." Williamson suggested Columbia's library system needed space for at least four million volumes. Low's rotunda had become overcrowded with a reference collection while the card catalogs could not be sufficiently accommodated in the building.

Williamson began soliciting funds from philanthropist and Columbia alumnus Edward Harkness, and he commissioned James Gamble Rogers to design a new library. Rogers's ambitious plan to complete University Hall also included a bridge and tunnel connecting it with Low. As part of this plan, Low's north wing would have been gutted and replaced with a staircase leading to the bridge. The plan was never realized because large portions of University Hall would have had to be rebuilt to accommodate the weight of the books, and the project was deemed too expensive. In December 1930 Butler asked Harkness to fund a new building on South Field facing Low from a site across 116th Street. Rogers devised a final design for South Hall (now Butler Library) in April 1931. The new library, which Harkness agreed to fund that May, would be able to hold four million volumes.

=== Administrative offices ===
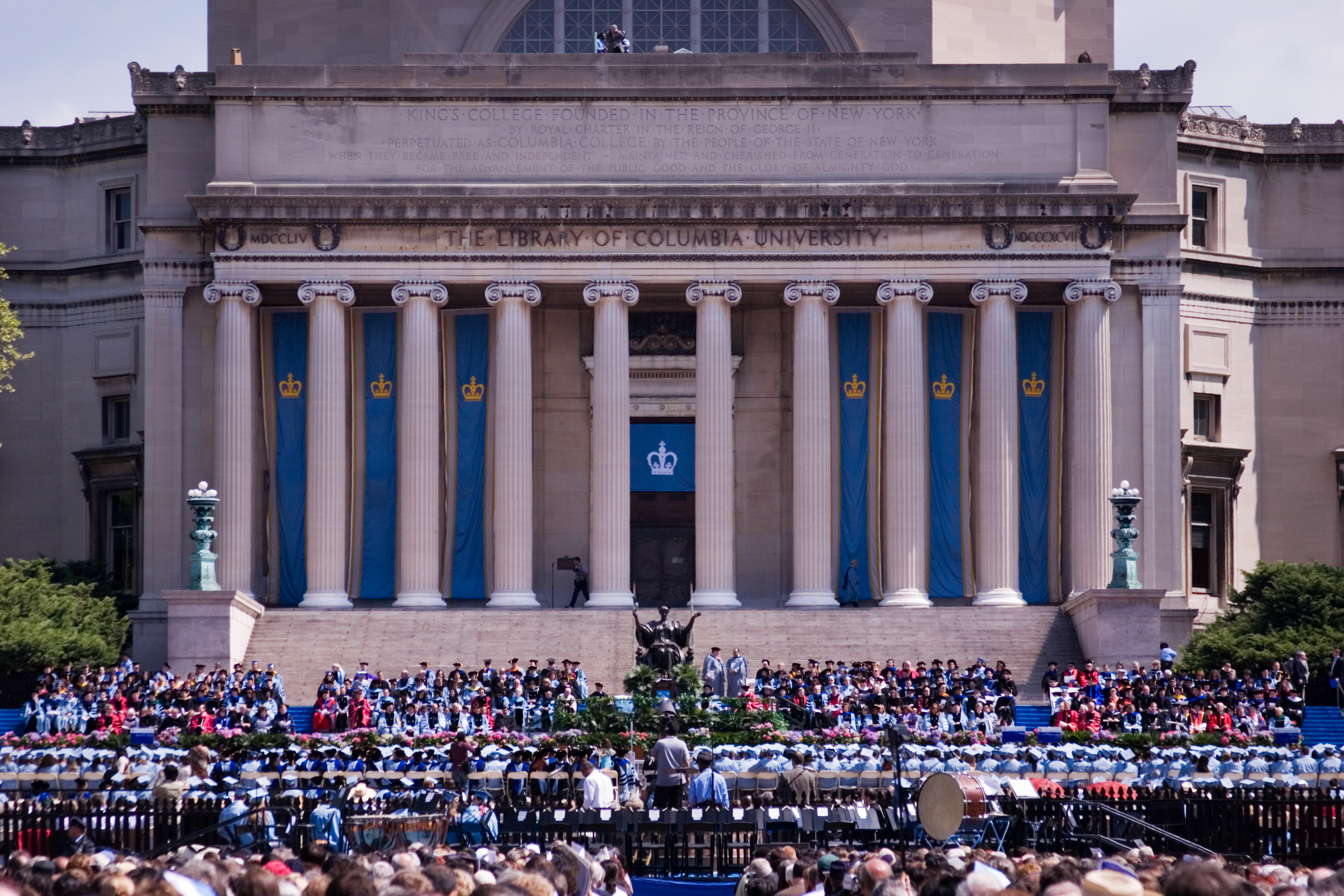
A commencement in front of Low Library, 2005

The new South Hall was dedicated on November 30, 1934. A giant slide was used to transport the 700,000 books – 22 mi (35 km) worth – in Low's stacks to the new library. Low continued to host the president's and secretary's offices, the summer session, and the Columbiana and Rare Book Collections. The rest of the building contained mostly faculty offices. Because people continued to refer to the building as "Low Library", some students were confused and believed the building still served as a library.

In the first few years after the South Hall library was completed, the Low building was used for events such as an exhibit of fine books, a show of Navajo art, and a display of rare religious art. Low was also used to host large ceremonies with notable guests of honor, including George VI and Queen Elizabeth of Britain, who visited Low in 1939, as well as British prime minister Winston Churchill and Queen Juliana of the Netherlands. In 1948 the west wing of the first floor was renovated as an office for the General of the U.S. Army Dwight D. Eisenhower when he became Columbia's president. Edmund Astley Prentis, and his wife and sister, donated a colonial-style drawing room to Low Library in 1960. Four years later, the north wing was turned into the Faculty Room, a reception hall with oak paneling.

The New York City Landmarks Preservation Commission (LPC) designated Low as a city landmark in 1966. During the 1968 Columbia protests, Low was occupied by students objecting to, among other things, the proposed construction of a university-owned gymnasium in Morningside Park and Columbia's involvement with the Vietnam War. A major anti-war protest also took place at Low in 1972. Among the less-conventional uses of the library's interior in the 1970s was a model airplane club being allowed to use the rotunda to fly miniature aircraft at weekends. The rotunda continued to host events like the annual Alfred I. duPont-Columbia University Awards for news broadcasters. The LPC designated the interior of the library's first floor as a city landmark in 1981. Low was added to the National Register of Historic Places in 1987 as a National Historic Landmark, and it was added to the New York State Register of Historic Places the same year.

In 2001 Columbia began to renovate Low's roof and add new mechanical systems to plans by David Paul Helpern Associates. The work was projected to cost $14.5 million (equivalent to $26.4 million in 2025) and the installation of the new mechanical systems would enable Columbia officials to remove mechanical equipment from the roof. At the time, the building was still open to the public on weekdays from 9:00 a.m. to 5:00 p.m. In the early 21st century Low continued to be the location of large events such as protests and rallies. For example, in 2016, students conducted a sit-in and a "sleep-out" to demand divestment from fossil fuel companies, and a chapter of Extinction Rebellion protested in the building in 2019.

== Impact ==
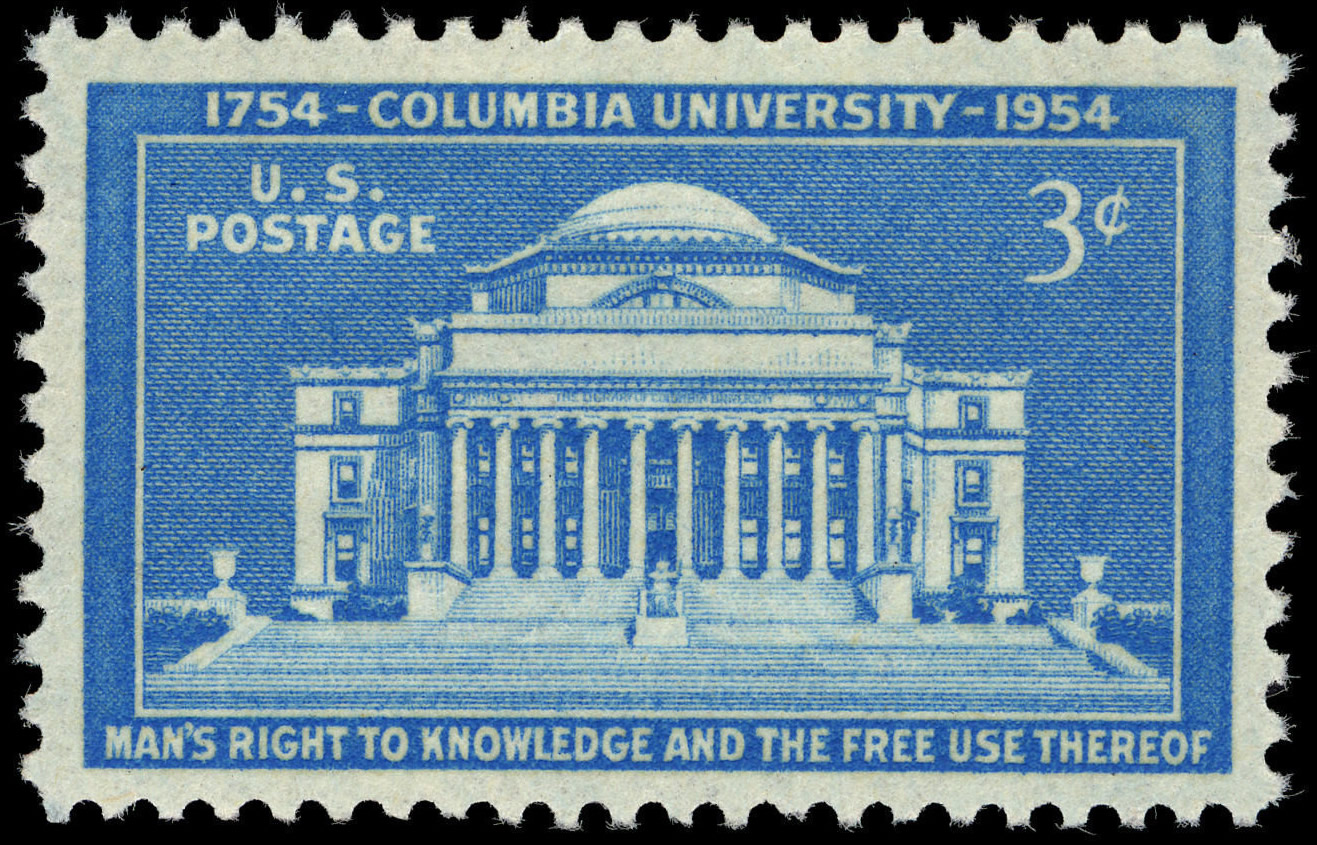
The 1954 Columbia University Bicentennial stamp depicts Low Library.

The Low Memorial Library was intended to symbolize Columbia's new campus and to serve as an administrative center. A 1995 article from the journal Library Columns said Low's cornerstone symbolizes the cornerstone of the entire campus "not only architecturally, but philosophically and philanthropically". Some early publications praised the design; one source said the library is "a utilitarian scheme artistically carried out", and another ranked the library "among the foremost in the world". The fifth edition of the AIA Guide to New York City described Low Memorial Library in 2010 as "Columbia University's most noteworthy visual symbol" and a "dignified centerpiece for the campus".

The Real Estate Record and Guide, believing Low to have been patterned after a French church by "the architect Rumpf", criticized Low's design as having been "plagiarized" from the older church. Montgomery Schuyler, who resented the fact the Columbia campus had not been designed in a Collegiate Gothic style, wrote in 1910: "the library of Columbia is a 'library de luxe and not de books'," citing a French friend. Architectural historian Richard Guy Wilson said: "The dome and space overpower while directional orientation to the necessities, such as picking up a book, are afterthoughts." According to Wilson, Low's exterior has "a powerful, rude strength of classicism being reborn" with refinement only in its architectural detail. Charles Harris Whitaker, former editor of the Journal of the American Institute of Architects, said of the library, "it used to be current gossip amongst the profession that the building had a place for everything – except books... The list of absurdities is infinite. The pile of arches, columns, cornices and ornament grew like an ant-hill."

The Low Memorial Library has appeared in several portrayals of Columbia University in popular culture, including the 2005 film Hitch and the 2017 film The Post. The library building has also been depicted on postage. In 1954, during the university's bicentennial, Low was commemorated on a postage stamp. For the university's semiquincentennial in 2004, an image of the library was placed on a pre-stamped postcard.

== See also ==
- List of libraries in 19th-century New York City
- List of New York City Designated Landmarks in Manhattan above 110th Street
- National Historic Landmarks in New York City
- National Register of Historic Places listings in Manhattan above 110th Street
