= EdLab =

Education research centre in New York City

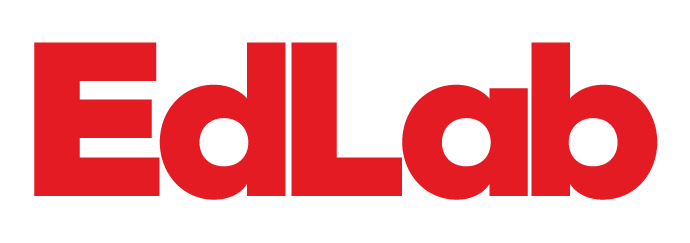
- Established: 2004; 22 years ago
- Research type: Education
- Field of research: Education, Ed tech, Future of libraries, Online learning, Electronic publishing, Distance education, Virtual learning environment, Civic engagement
- Director: Gary Natriello
- Staff: 72
- Location: 525 West 120th Street, New York City, New York, 10027, United States
- Campus: Teachers College, Columbia University
- Affiliations: The Gottesman Libraries
- Website: edlab.tc.columbia.edu

EdLab is an education research organization located at Columbia University's Teachers College in New York City. The EdLab attempts to create easier methods of education through communication and advancements in technology, and serves as both a university and community resource center.

Founded in 2004, it started under the leadership of Professor Gary Natriello, Edlab is a unit of the Gottesman Libraries at Teachers College. EdLab houses both library administration and an interdisciplinary team of developers, designers and content creators. Their work is divided into five foundational areas: Reimagining Schooling, Innovations for Online Learning, New Directions for Online Publishing, Efficiencies in Educational Research, and Charting the Future of Libraries. EdLab is organized in small flexible multi-disciplinary teams that collaborate to develop and deliver products and services of distinction.

== Projects ==
=== Vialogues (2011-present) ===
Vialogues is a free, online video discussion platform. It was created and developed by a dedicated team of educators, researchers, and engineers from EdLab at Teachers College Columbia University. As well as uploading original content, vialogues allows users to "borrow" content from YouTube & Vimeo in order to create a discussion. Vialogues also allows users to embed video discussion on other websites, and allows videos to be private or public, as well as include interactive features like polls. Research has shown that the use of cognitive words within vialogues discussions contributes positively to user engagement, in addition to the number of views, the number of moderator comments, and the number of time-code clicks, which also correlate positively with user engagement.

=== New Learning Times ===
The New Learning Times (NLT) is an online publication created and hosted by EdLab, centered on developing innovations in the education sector. It publishes articles daily, aiming to provide "coverage of the transformation of learning opportunities in the information age for those shaping the future of education". NLT publishes a number of regular features including:

- EdLab Review
- NL Sector
- Research Digest
- Seen in NY
- VisualizED

Between January and March 2019, NLT had 18,770 user visits.

==== Seen in NY ====
Seen in NY was a weekly web series produced by EdLab Studios and published as part of the New Learning Times project platform. As a video series, Seen in NY focused on current educational opportunities in New York. The videos were designed as a resource for the education community, and as stand-alone pieces which represented the work of the featured organization or event. They were part of the new learning sector, where the experience of making the videos are part of the pedagogic experience, as video dialogues.

Seen in NY featured a wide array of educational opportunities, experiences and events, from hundreds of different organizations in New York City, and across the entire state. There are approximately 250 episodes spanning multiple demographics and featuring a diverse range of subject matter, from STEM, to arts, and social justice, that are available on the EdLab blog, on EdLab's Vialogues interface, and as embedded content on the subject of the videos' organization websites.

==== Series overview ====
Season	Episodes	Originally released	
Season	Episodes	First released	Last released
2012	10	October 18, 2012	December 26, 2012
2013	51	January 2, 2013	December 25, 2013
2014	52	January 1, 2014	December 31, 2014
2015	50	January 7, 2015	December 23, 2015
2016	38	January 6, 2016	December 28, 2016
2017	21	January 11, 2016	December 27, 2016
2018	5	March 21, 2018	June 27, 2018

=== Rhizr ===
Rhizr is an online learning tool which brings together learners of similar interests and provides a space to share thoughts, work together, and build off of ideas. Users are able to create, remix and share educational resources amongst each other. Rhizr was created in 2017 by a team of researchers, developers, and content creators at the Gottesman Libraries of Teachers College Columbia University. The mSchool initiative paved the way for what is now known as Rhizr. The name is a metaphor based on a Rhizome, which is a structure of roots and nodes organized in a random and non-hierarchically structure. "Rhizomatic learning" is based on ideas from Gilles Deleuze. Rhizr utilizes modules so that users can share, organize and save information in a non-linear way with a format that is similar to Trello. In June 2019 a new version of Rhizr was released by EdLab with greater flexibility and faster search.

=== EdLab Seminar ===
EdLab hosts seminars at the EdLab space on the 5th Floor of the Gottesman Libraries at Teachers College (almost) every Wednesday.

== Teachers College Record ==
EdLab is the publisher of the Teachers College Record, a journal of research, analysis, and commentary in the field of education which has been published continuously since 1900 by Teachers College.

== Research ==
Postdoctoral research scientists at EdLab develop and evaluate educational technology tools and services.
