= C.V. Starr East Asian Library =

Library at Columbia University

Coordinates: 40.807273°N 73.961627°W

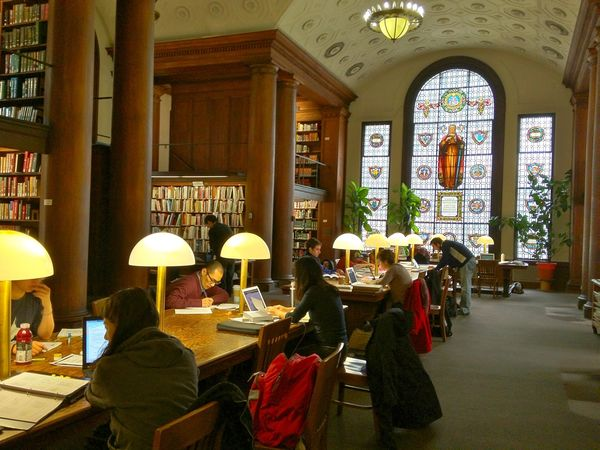
C.V. Starr East Asian Library

The C.V. Starr East Asian Library is a library at Columbia University, holding collections for the study of East Asia in the United States. It is one of the largest East Asian libraries in North America, consisting of over one million volumes of Chinese, Japanese, Korean, Tibetan, Mongolian, Manchu, and Western-language materials, almost 7,500 periodical titles, and extensive special collections. It is located in Kent Hall, on the university's Morningside Heights campus.

== History ==
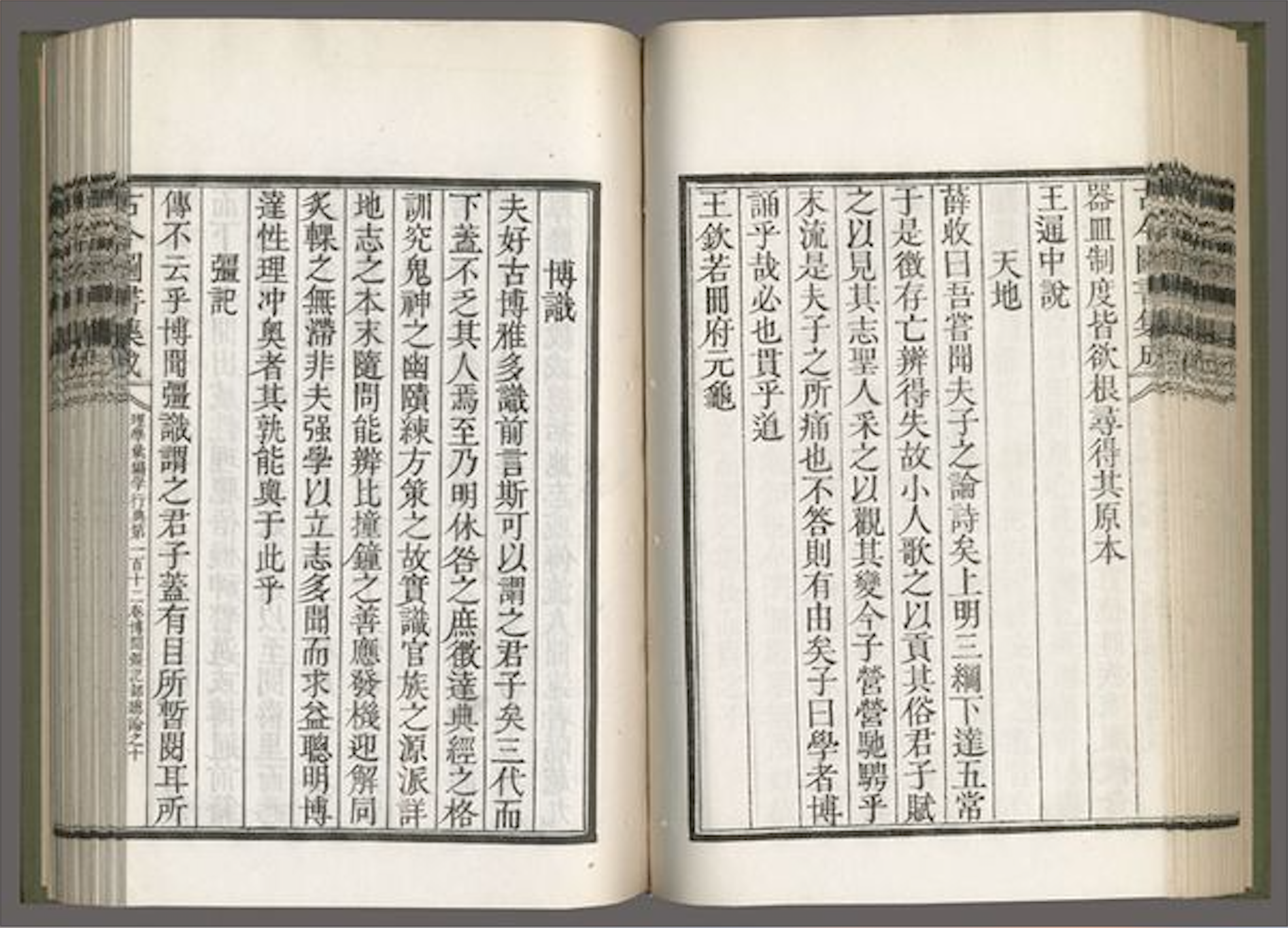
The Columbia University copy of the Gujin Tushu Jicheng, rebound in a Western style by Professor Friedrich Hirth for ease of handling

The library was established in 1902. Seth Low, president of Columbia University at the time, wished to start a Chinese library. The foundation for the library and the Chinese collection began with a donation by Empress Dowager Cixi of the 5,044 volume encyclopedia Gujin Tushu Jicheng, one of three copies of the book currently located outside of China. The Japanese collection began in 1927 by Professor Ryūsaku Tsunoda, who acquired some 5,000 volumes from the Japanese Imperial Household Agency, and the Korean collection began in 1931 with a donation of nearly 1,000 books by Korean students at Columbia.

In the decades after its foundation, the library established materials exchange programs with almost every important university and government library and archive in Taiwan and China. Its relationship with the National Library of China in Beijing began in 1963, through which it was able to acquire, at significantly cheaper prices, materials that would have otherwise been impossible to access through its old method of buying books in Hong Kong and Japan. Over the duration of the exchange program, Columbia received copies of the People's Daily, the Red Flag, and the Beijing Review, a "complete set of Communist law books," in addition to transcriptions of opera performances, recordings of folk music and orchestral performances using Chinese instruments, and films of traditional Chinese paintings. However, these programs stopped in the early 2000s, when the Columbia University Libraries discontinued its exchange department.

In 1968, the library received a 6,000-item collection of rare Chinese books from General Li Hanhun, which on its own was described as "equal to the top institutional Chinese libraries in [the United States]" in the 1960s. The books were smuggled out of China in 1949, and were mostly printed on rice paper using hand-carved blocks.

The library was gifted $1 million by the Starr Foundation in 1980, which were put towards the renovation of its Kent Hall facilities. In gratitude, the library was named for Cornelius Vander Starr.

== Special collections ==
The special collections of the C.V. Starr Library hold rare books and materials including Chinese local histories and genealogies, Edo period woodblock-printed books, and rare Korean books, as well as Chinese oracle bones, a jade book in Manchu and Chinese, early-twentieth century Chinese paper god prints, and Japanese woodblock prints, maps, and paintings. The Japanese rare books and special collections include the Kōbō Abe collection, consisting of the original works and manuscripts of the author, as well as the Barbara Curtis Adachi Bunraku collection and the Makino Mamoru Collection on the History of East Asian Film. The library's Korean collection holds, among other things, an extremely rare early printed version of Yongbieocheonga, volumes 9 and 10, the first work ever written in Hangul. The Tibetan collection, which began actively collecting in the late 1990s, includes the manuscripts of Tibetan journalist Gegen Darje Tarchin and Anagarika Govinda, and several editions of the Tibetan Buddhist canon, some dating as early as the 14th century.
