= Teachers College Record =

- Discipline: Education
- Language: English

Publication details
- History: 1900-present
- Publisher: Teachers College, Columbia University
- Frequency: Monthly
- Impact factor: 1.072 (2017)

Standard abbreviations
- ISO 4: Teach. Coll. Rec.

Indexing
- ISSN: 0161-4681 (print); 1467-9620 (web)
- LCCN: 92645723
- OCLC no.: 1590002

Links
- Journal homepage; Online access

Teachers College Record is a monthly peer-reviewed academic journal of education that was established in 1900. It is published by EdLab at Teachers College, Columbia University. The journal also "pre-publishes" papers online, and curates special online issues with the aim of building a weekly audience by utilizing online technologies in order to increase relevancy and reduce publication lag.

== Editors ==
The editor-in-chief was Gary Natriello since 1995 until June 2019

== Abstracting and indexing ==
The journal is abstracted and indexed in:

- PsycINFO
- Scopus
- Academic Search
- America: History and Life
- Current Contents/Social & Behavioral Science
- EBSCO databases
- ProQuest databases
- Social Sciences Citation Index

According to the Journal Citation Reports, the journal has a 2017 impact factor of 1.072.

== The Voice ==
Teachers College Record publishes a bi-weekly video series entitled "The Voice" which was developed, and is produced by the EdLab. The Voice is published on EdLab's video platform Vialogues, with the aim of communicating traditional academic papers in an innovative way. Over 350 episodes of The Voice have been published.
