= Beverly R. Betts =

American reverend and librarian

Beverly Robinson Betts (August 3, 1827 – May 21, 1899) was an American reverend and librarian, who served as the first "professional" librarian of the Columbia University Libraries.

Betts was born in New York City on August 3, 1827 to William Betts, a law professor and trustee at Columbia University. Beverley Betts himself graduated from Columbia College in 1846, and from the General Theological Seminary in 1850. The same year he was ordained a deacon, and served as rector of various churches in Long Island and New York City from 1851 to 1865, when he appointed head librarian of the Columbia Libraries following faculty complaints about the library's management under William Alfred Jones. As librarian, Betts replaced its badly outdated catalog, and accepted 7,000 volumes from the personal collections of alumnus Stephen Whitney Felix, which included a Shakespeare First Folio, an illuminated book of hours, and "several important U.S. literary manuscripts." However, he did little to expand the library's collections, under his ideal "of forming a library of moderate extent indeed, but of the highest character," leading librarian Kenneth J. Brough to criticize him as "incompetent and lazy". Following complaints by political science professor John Burgess, the university board of trustees reorganized the library, and President Frederick Barnard replaced him in 1883 with the more progressive Melvil Dewey. He died on May 21, 1899.
