= Columbia Law School Center for Japanese Legal Studies =

US research center

Coordinates: 40.80693°N 73.96027°W

Center for Japanese Legal Studies
- Founded: 1980
- Location: Box E-27, Columbia Law School, 435 W. 116th Street, New York, NY USA 10027
- Parent organization: Columbia Law School
- Website: jls.law.columbia.edu
- Remarks: The first and only center of its kind in the U.S.

The Center for Japanese Legal Studies (CJLS) at Columbia Law School is the first and only center of its kind in the United States.

The Center for Japanese Legal Studies advances the study of Japanese law at Columbia Law School and fosters intellectual exchange between the Columbia community and the legal profession of Japan. The Center strives to be the principal source of intellectual exchange between the legal professions of the United States and Japan. Columbia Law School consistently ranks among the top schools nationally in the field of international law.

The CJLS holds that its main challenge today is keeping abreast of dynamic changes in the Japanese legal system over the past decade. Reforms have been motivated by a variety of factors, ranging from domestic economic and demographic pressures to international relations considerations and the forces of globalization. Understanding and responding to these significant institutional changes requires in depth research and the timely dissemination of ideas.

== History ==
Columbia Law School’s focus on Japanese law dates to the aftermath of World War II. Columbia spearheaded bilateral collaboration among lawyers, judges, and legal scholars. As early as the 1950s, the University of Tokyo invited the late Professor Walter Gellhorn CLS ’31, an architect of U.S. administrative law, to be a visiting professor in the Faculty of Law. Professor Gellhorn envisioned a center for Japanese legal studies at Columbia to facilitate student and faculty exchanges and to disseminate research on the fundamental changes in post-war Japanese law and society. In 1980, the Center for Japanese Legal Studies was founded at Columbia Law School with support from the Fuyo Group (a leading group of Japanese corporations and financial institutions at the time) and the Japan-U.S. Friendship Commission. Curtis J. Milhaupt directed the Center from 1999 through 2017.

== Today ==
More than a quarter century later, the Center continues its mission to enhance the understanding of the Japanese legal system within the Columbia University community and beyond. During this time, the activities and reputation of the Center have grown in tandem with the increasing presence of Japanese students and scholars at Columbia Law School. In the decade from 1990 to 2009, the number of Japanese LL.M. students studying at Columbia Law School annually more than doubled. The number of students studying Japanese law at Columbia has increased steadily. And Columbia Law School sends more students each summer to complete internships in Japan, both in law firms and public interest organizations, than any other major U.S. law school. The Center is currently led by Executive Director Nobuhisa Ishizuka and Assistant Director Nick Pozek.

== Toshiba Library ==
Among the wealth of resources available to the Center for Japanese Legal Studies is the Toshiba Library for Japanese Legal Research, which is considered to be among the finest private collections of Japanese Law and is the country’s premier collection of Japanese law materials.

The library began in 1982 with a gift of the private collection of the late Jiro Tanaka, Justice of the Supreme Court of Japan from 1964 to 1973. Columbia Law School's Arthur W. Diamond Law Library began developing a comprehensive Japanese law collection in 1984 to support research and teaching at the Center. A permanent position of Japanese law curator was established with a generous endowment from the Toshiba Corporation. In 2003, the collection was enhanced by a gift of the private collection of Itsuo Sonobe, a visiting scholar at the Columbia Law School in 1958, who served as a Justice of the Supreme Court of Japan from 1989 to 1997.

The Toshiba Library is tended by a full-time curator. The collection contains approximately 36,000 volumes of books and bound periodicals, more than 90 percent of which are in Japanese.

== CJLS Programs ==
- Conducting academic research and publishing
- Teaching students from around the world to become leading practitioners, academics, and public officials in their home countries
- Arranging on-campus speaker series, as well as conferences in the United States and Japan
- Facilitating a faculty exchange program with the University of Tokyo
- Interacting with an energetic network of over 400 Japan-based alumni
- Publishing newsletters and reports on current events related to Japanese law
- Collaborating with other institutes, such as the Weatherhead East Asian Institute and Columbia Business School’s Center on Japanese Economy and Business
- Administering student fellowships, and study abroad programs at Waseda University and Hitotsubashi University
- Providing advice and employment assistance to law students pursuing professional careers involving Japan
