= Elder High School =

Location
- 3900 Vincent Avenue; Price Hill; Cincinnati, Ohio 45205; United States; 39.112602°N 84.578639°W

Information
- School type: Private, Parochial, College-preparatory school
- Motto: Latin: Altiora (Strive for the higher things)
- Religious affiliation: Roman Catholic
- Established: 1922; 104 years ago
- School district: Roman Catholic Archdiocese of Cincinnati
- Principal: Kurt Ruffing
- Teaching staff: 61.5 (FTE) (2017–18)
- Grades: 9–12
- Gender: All-male
- Enrollment: 800 (2023-2024)
- Student to teacher ratio: 13.0:1 (2017–18)
- Colors: Royal purple White
- Athletics conference: Greater Catholic League South
- Mascot: Panther
- Newspaper: The Purple Quill
- Yearbook: Elderado
- Tuition: US$15,300 (2021–22)
- Website: www.elderhs.org

Elder High School is a Catholic all-male, college-preparatory high school in the Price Hill neighborhood of Cincinnati, Ohio. The high school has been in existence for over 100 years, and is a diocesan high school within the Archdiocese of Cincinnati.

== History ==
The cornerstone was laid in 1922. Named for William Henry Elder, third bishop and Archbishop of Cincinnati, it was the city's fourth high school and first Catholic diocesan high school. Eventually, 12 other such schools were constructed in the Greater Cincinnati area.

Eleven original parishes of the Western Hills neighborhood were the true founders of the school and served as "feeder parishes" for students. The first graduating class was in 1923, with eight students graduating in the year of the school's opening. Since its founding, over 22,000 students have graduated from the school.

Elder educated girls as well as boys its first five years.

In 1927, Elder's girls' department was transferred to Seton High School next door.

== Academics ==
The school's curriculum is accredited by the Ohio Department of Education and the Ohio Catholic School Accrediting Association. Several levels of curriculum are provided. The school has an Honors Program which provides the top students Advanced Placement courses in Art, Calculus, Chemistry, Computer Science, English, World History, U.S. History, American Government, and Physics. In addition, Elder offers other level courses including (in order from most advanced to least) Honors+ (H+), Honors (H), Advanced College Prep (ACP), College Prep 1 (CP1), and College Prep 2 (CP2).

Elder High School was named the Best Private High School in the Greater Cincinnati Area by Cincinnati Magazine.

== Athletics ==
=== Championship titles ===
On June 4, 2005, the Elder varsity baseball team won their record 12th OHSAA Division I State Championship, defeating Toledo Start 3–0. The school has won at least one baseball state championship in every decade since the 1940s, and the baseball team was ranked eighth in the nation in 2005. As of 2006, the Elder baseball program has the most wins (1257-493-4), from 1924 through 2006, and state titles (12) of any school in Ohio.

In addition to baseball, Elder High School has won multiple OHSAA State Championships in several other major sports, including football, basketball, and cross country:

- Baseball – 1943, 1952, 1955, 1956, 1958–1960, 1973, 1978, 1984, 1999, 2005
- Cross country – 1973, 1982, 1986, 1988, 1989
- Basketball – 1973, 1974, 1993
- Football – 2002, 2003

Non-OHSAA-sponsored state championships include:

- Volleyball (Ohio High School Boys Volleyball Association) – 1999, 2000, 2008, 2010, 2014, 2016

=== The Pit ===
Football games are played at "The Pit". Construction began in the 1930s by students and faculty and was completed in December 1947. The stadium seats 10,000.

=== The Panther Fitness Center ===
Elder High School underwent significant expansion with the 2018 construction of the Panther Fitness Center, a two-story facility on the east side of the school, adding new weight training space, locker rooms, coaches' offices, and wrestling practice areas.

== Notable alumni ==
Academia

- Robert Kaske – professor of medieval literature at Cornell University

Athletics

- Buzz Boyle – MLB player (Boston Braves, Brooklyn Dodgers)
- Ralph Brickner – MLB player (Boston Red Sox)
- Robert Hoernschemeyer (1943) – professional football running back
- Jim Brosnan (1945) – pitcher for the Chicago Cubs, St. Louis Cardinals, Cincinnati Reds and Chicago White Sox
- Bob Fry (1949) – professional football offensive lineman
- Gordon Massa (1953) – catcher for the Chicago Cubs, 1957–1958
- Ron Moeller – MLB player (Baltimore Orioles, Los Angeles Angels, Washington Senators)
- Steve Junker (1953) – professional football tight end for 1957 NFL champion Detroit Lions
- Dan James (1955) – professional football player
- Joe Schaffer (1955) – professional football player for the Buffalo Bills, 1960
- Steve Tensi (1961) – professional football quarterback
- Bill Earley (1974) – pitcher for the St. Louis Cardinals, 1986
- Chris Nichting (1984) – Major League Baseball pitcher
- Pat Kelsey (1993) – He is the current head men's basketball coach at the University of Louisville. Former head coach of the Division I College of Charleston.
- Dan Rohrmeier – MLB player (Seattle Mariners)
- Ricky Brown (2002) – professional football player for the Oakland Raiders
- Eric Wood (2004) – 28th pick in the 2009 NFL draft and former professional football player for the Buffalo Bills
- Mike Windt (2004) – Former professional football player for the San Diego Chargers
- Jake McQuaide (2006) – professional football player for the Dallas Cowboys
- Kyle Rudolph (2008) – All-American college football tight end, Notre Dame; professional football player previously for the Minnesota Vikings and the Tampa Bay Buccaneers
- Tommy Kraemer (2016) – NFL offensive guard for the Detroit Lions
- Peyton Ramsey (2016) – former college football quarterback
- Steve Keller – professional soccer player for the Dallas Burn
- Joe Royer (2020) – college football tight end
- Luke Kandra (2020) - former college and professional football offensive lineman

Clergy

- John J. Kaising – Auxiliary Bishop of the Archdiocese for the Military Services, USA

Business

- George Schaefer Jr. – former CEO of Fifth Third Bancorp

Government and politics

- Donald D. Clancy – eight-term Republican member of the United States House of Representatives (January 3, 1961 – January 3, 1977)
- Steve Driehaus (1984) – former Democratic member of the U.S. House of Representatives, 1st district
- Henry Jude (Trey) Radel III (1994) former Republican member of the U.S. House of Representatives

Media/Entertainment

- Jim Borgman – Pulitzer Prize–winning cartoonist for The Cincinnati Enquirer
- Bill Hemmer (1983) – Fox News Channel journalist and anchor, formerly with CNN
- John Riggi – Emmy Award-nominated comedy writer for 30 Rock.
