= John Joseph Kaising =

American Roman Catholic priest and bishop

John Joseph Kaising (March 3, 1936 – January 17, 2007) was an American Roman Catholic bishop who served the Archdiocese for the Military Services. He was a priest for 44 years and a bishop for 6.7 years.

== Biography ==
Born in Cincinnati, Ohio, on March 3, 1936, Kaising graduated from Elder High School. He was ordained to the priesthood for the Roman Catholic Archdiocese of Cincinnati. Kaising became a priest at age 26 on 22 December 1962. In the late 1960s he taught religion at Alter High School in Kettering, Ohio, and in 1969 the death in Vietnam of an Alter graduate he had taught moved him to enter service as a military chaplain. He served as an active duty chaplain from 1969 to 1998, retiring as a full colonel.

On February 21, 2000, he was named auxiliary bishop for the Roman Catholic Archdiocese for the Military Services and Titular Bishop of Horrea Coelia. On April 11, 2000, he received his consecration. On January 13, 2007, he died in his Washington, D.C., home at age 70.

Kaising has received Legion of Merit with one Oak Leaf Cluster, Bronze Star with one Oak Leaf Cluster, Meritorious Service Medal with four Oak Leaf Clusters, Air Medal, Army Commendation Medal, and Army Achievement Medal.
