= George C. Schaeffer =

American engineer, chemist and librarian

George Christian Schaeffer (December 8, 1814 – October 4, 1873) was an American engineer, chemist, and librarian.

Schaeffer was born in Harrisburg, Pennsylvania, and attended Columbia University, where his father served as a professor. As an engineer, he worked under David Bates Douglass from 1833 to 1836 in surveying and constructing the Croton Aqueduct, and from 1837 onwards served as an editor (and later sole owner) of the American Railroad Journal. He was the chief librarian of the Columbia University Libraries from 1839 to 1847, when he was appointed the chair of the Natural Philosophy, Chemistry, and Geology department of Centre College in Danville, Kentucky. He resigned after five years to become the principal examiner of the United States Patent and Trademark Office. Later, he would serve as the chair of Materia Medica and Therapeutics at Georgetown University (1854–1858), the a professor of the science of agriculture, including chemistry and its application to the arts, geology, and mineralogy at the Maryland Agriculture College, later known as the University of Maryland, College Park (1859–1861), and the chair of the Chemistry, Physics, and Natural History department at Columbia. During the American Civil War, Schaeffer worked under the engineering department of the Union army, surveying land for George B. McClellan during the Peninsula campaign in 1862, and was personally consulted several times by Abraham Lincoln for his surveying expertise. Following the war, he was appointed Librarian of the Patent Office and of the Copyright Library, resigning in 1873. He would die later that year.
