= George Schaefer (finance) =

George Alphonse Schaefer Jr. (born May 17, 1945) is the former CEO of Fifth Third Bancorp in Cincinnati, Ohio, a financial services company whose banking arm is Fifth Third Bank. In April 2007, Schaefer stepped down as CEO, deferring to Kevin T. Kabat, retaining his role as chairman of the board.

Born in Ohio and raised in Cincinnati, Mr. Schaefer is a 1963 graduate of Elder High School. Upon graduation he was appointed to West Point where he received his bachelor of science degree in 1967, in nuclear engineering. He was commissioned a 2nd Lieutenant and soon after entered U.S. Army Ranger school. He was a veteran of the Vietnam War, was awarded a Bronze Star and left the Army in 1970. He is a 1974 graduate of Xavier University Business School with an M.B.A. degree focused on finance.

He joined Fifth Third Bank in 1971 and continued in increasing roles within Fifth Third Bank, becoming a director in 1988, a company officer in 1990, at which time he reached the top position.

He is married to Betty Ann (Bruser) Schaefer. They have 3 children, George III, Shaune and Thomas.
