= Li Lu Law Library =

Library of Columbia Law School

Coordinates: 40.8071°N 73.9603°W

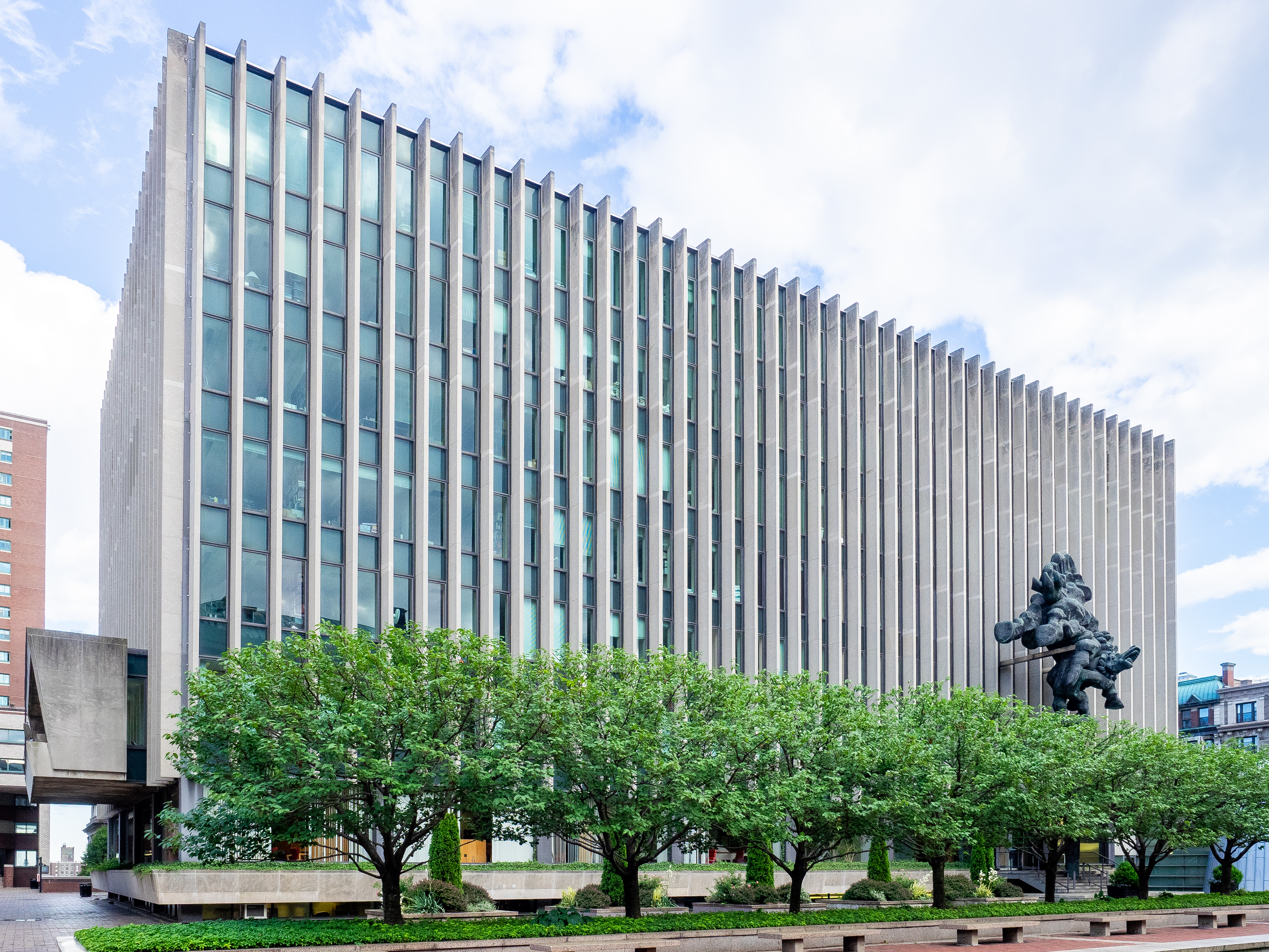
(2019)

The Li Lu Law Library is the law library of Columbia Law School. Located in Jerome L. Greene Hall on the university's Morningside Heights campus, it is named after alumnus Li Lu, who pledged $15 million to support the project.

== History ==
Columbia Law School was established in 1858, and by 1876 its library held over 4,000 volumes. In 1898, the library consisted of 25,000 volumes, and was described as "one of the most complete in the country." Its collections grew to 95,581 volumes by 1921, when the library began an effort to rapidly expand in preparation for Columbia Law School's centennial. The Columbia University Law Library Association was formed, with the goal of encouraging donations, creating a student loan collection for students unable to purchase their own books, and protecting the library's existing collections.

Notable acquisitions throughout the library's history include the von Richthofen library, which consisted of 4,250 volumes on local laws in medieval Germany and was purchased in 1929; and the 1951 donation of some 1,100 volumes on copyright from Edwin P. Kilroe, assistant district attorney of New York County and legal counsel at the Twentieth Century-Fox Film Corporation. In 1982, the family of Japanese Supreme Court Justice Jiro Tanaka donated over 13,000 items to the library, which formed the core of the Toshiba Library for Japanese Legal Research, one of the most comprehensive collections of Japanese law outside of Japan, and the largest in the United States. It holds the private papers of Tanaka as well as Justice Itsuo Sonobe.

Other rare items in the possession of the library include a 1482 copy of the Corpus Juris Civilis, one of 15 printed drafts of the Constitution of India, and 22 incunabula (including three copies of Nicholas Statham's Abridgment, as well as volumes from the private collections of Richard Harison, John Jay, Samuel Johnson, James Kent, and Melvin Krulewitch.

== See also ==
- Columbia Law School Center for Japanese Legal Studies
