= Gottesman Libraries =

University library in New York City

The Gottesman Libraries is located in Russell Hall at Teachers College, Columbia University at 525 West 120th Street, and is the sole library of Teachers College graduate school. It is one of the nation's largest and most comprehensive research libraries in education, and the scope of its collections reflect the historic commitment to advanced study in education, psychology, and the health professions in their local, national, and international dimensions. Its standard opening hours are Monday through Thursday 8 am to 11 pm, Friday 8 am to 7 pm, Saturday 12 pm to 7 pm, and Sunday 12 pm to 11 pm. The library provides numerous services in support of the learning, teaching, and research needs of its members and affiliated members, including online and in-person support; chat or real-time transmission of text messages; course readings integrated with the library services platform and College's learning management system; sponsored events; exhibits and displays; instructional offerings and research consultations; the Library Blog; and live musical performances. Automated acquisitions, interlibrary loan, printing, scanning, kiosks and monitors; and room booking services are available. Historical collections focus on pedagogical research, curriculum and children's literature, and institutional history and are integrated into EDUCAT+, the library's online catalog, powered by Primo VE.

In 2001 the library received a $6.5 million gift from Professor Ruth Gottesman, to establish 'the Library of the Future'. A dedication ceremony was held on November 4, 2004. Previously the library of Teachers College was known as Milbank Memorial Library, named after Thomas Milbank and dedicated as such in 1982. Before moving to Russell Hall in 1924, where it occupied four floors and the tower, it was located at 9 University Place, and known as the Bryson Library, named after Mrs. Peter M. Bryson.

== Galleries ==
The Gottesman Libraries features two art galleries; The Kasser Exhibition Space in the entrance of the first floor, and the Offit Family Gallery, on the third floor, located past the large reading room. In addition to these spaces, there is an exhibit area on the second floor, known for its congenial, collaborative setting, and the library has hosted art and exhibits in additional locations, including the Everett Cafe, also situated close to the entrance.

== Smith Learning Theater ==
The Smith Learning Theater is housed on the 4th floor of the Gottesman Libraries, and it is under the direction of the Digital Futures Institute to facilitate ambitious teaching and learning opportunities. The Smith Learning Theater was made possible by an $8 million gift from George and Camilla Smith, which allowed for the renovation of the 4th floor of the Gottesman Libraries, in order to create an "experimental and demonstration space" for Teachers College students and faculty. Architect firm Shepley Bulfinch, having executed prior renovations at the Gottesman Libraries, were responsible for the design, allowing research into new ways of teaching.
