= Butler Library =

Main library of Columbia University

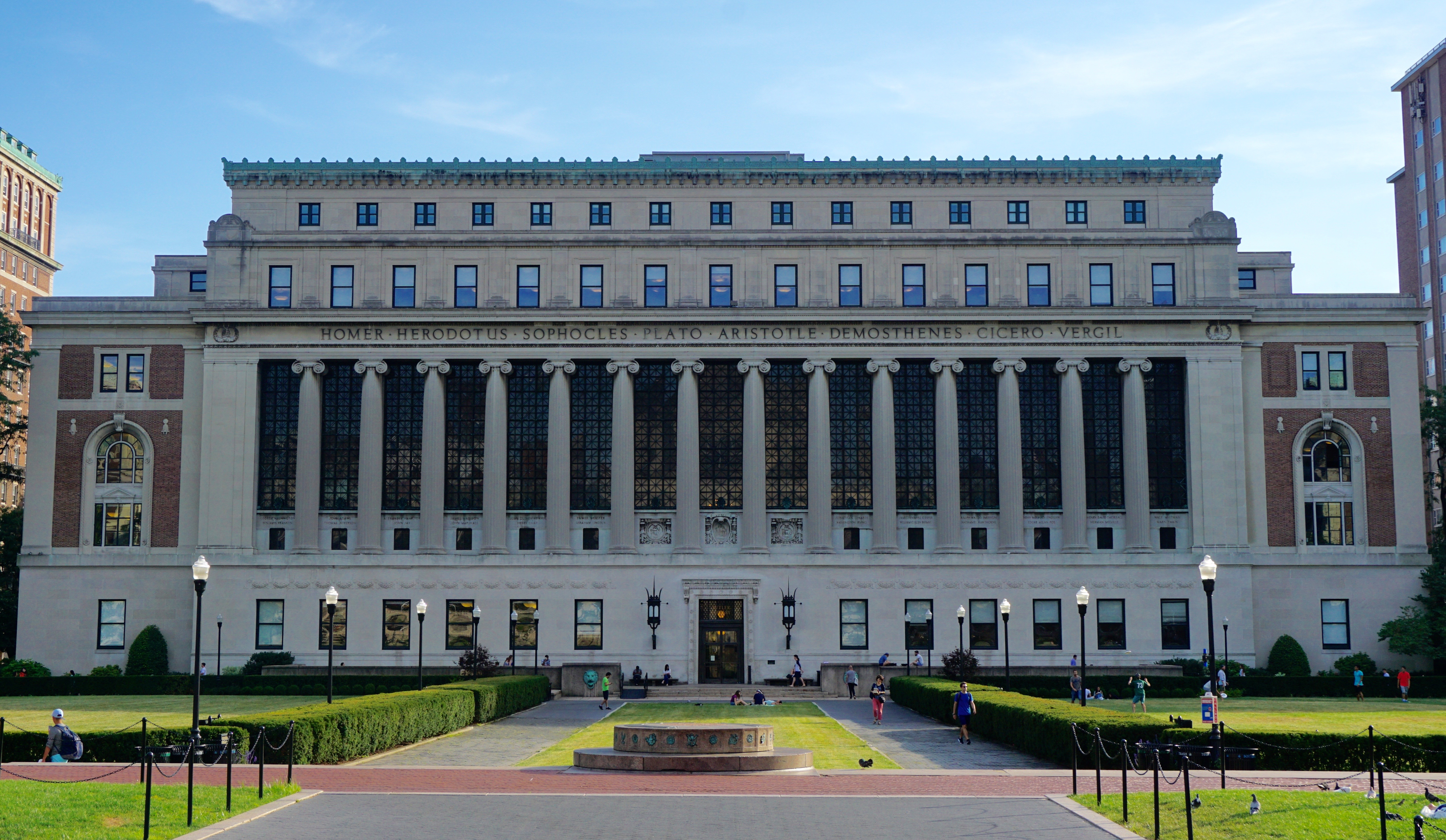
- Butler Library at Columbia University in New York City
- 40°48′23″N 73°57′48″W
- Location: New York City, New York, U.S., United States
- Type: Academic library
- Established: 1934
- Branch of: Columbia University Libraries

Collection
- Size: 2 million

Other information
- Website: library.columbia.edu/libraries/butler.html/

Butler Library is located on the Morningside Heights campus of Columbia University at 535 West 114th Street, in Manhattan, New York City. It is the university's largest single library with over 2 million volumes, as well as one of the largest buildings on the campus. It houses the Columbia University Libraries collections in the humanities, history, social sciences, literature, philosophy, and religion, and the Columbia Rare Book and Manuscript Library.

The Neoclassical style building was built in 1931–1934 to a design by James Gamble Rogers. Butler Library remains at least partially open 24 hours a day during the academic year.

== History ==
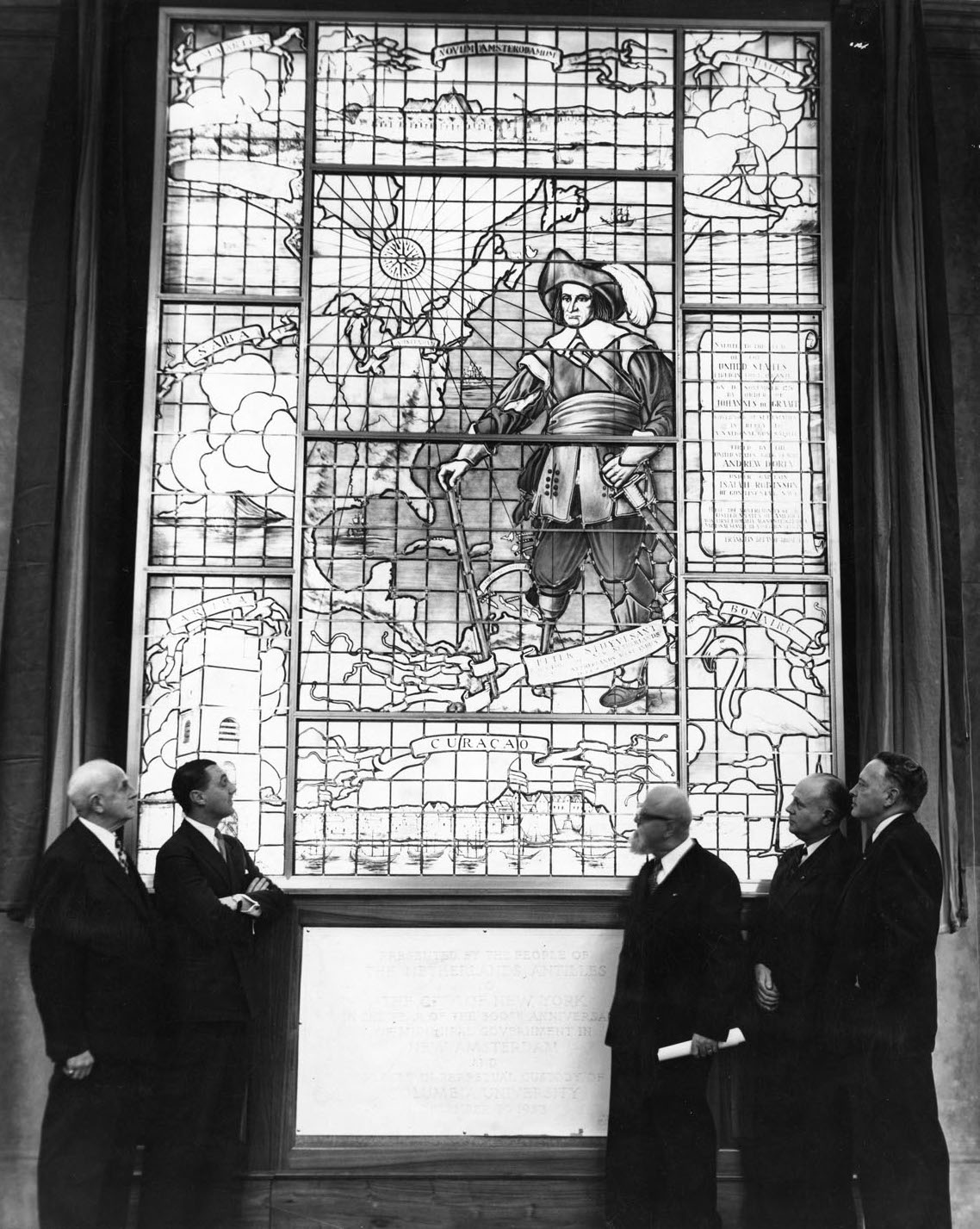
The 1954 unveiling of the 12-foot stained-glass window depicting Peter Stuyvesant in Butler 209, given to the university by the Netherlands Antillean government in celebration of the 300th anniversary of the founding of New Amsterdam and the Columbia University Bicentennial

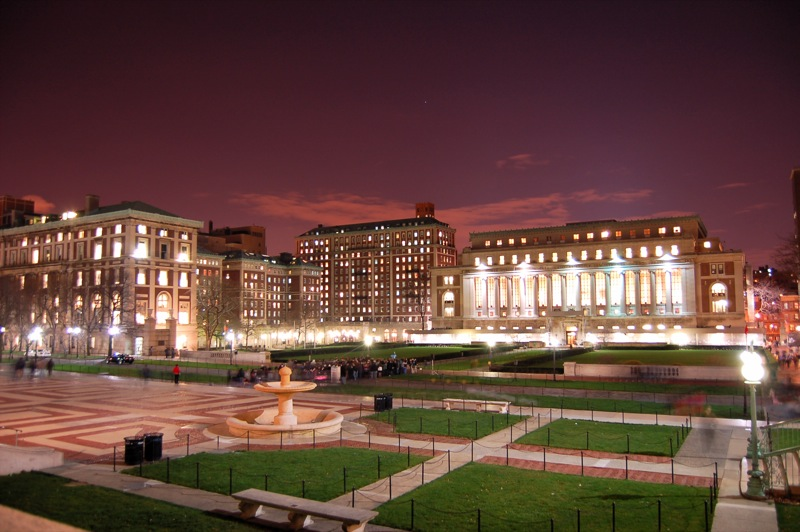
Butler Library within the architectural context of the surrounding McKim, Mead & White buildings

=== Planning and construction ===
Butler was built from 1931 to 1934 in order to replace the existing Low Library, which was completed in 1897, but by the 1920s had already proved inadequate for the needs of the university's expanding library. The first proposal to build a new library building was made in 1922 by Nicholas Murray Butler, the president of Columbia University from 1902 to 1945, who suggested that the unfinished University Hall, which sat behind Low where Uris Hall stands today, could be completed for library use.

Following a letter from the director of the Columbia Libraries, Charles C. Williamson, in August 1927, which detailed the library's need for space, Butler began seriously contemplating the University Hall expansion. He began soliciting funds from the philanthropist and alumnus Edward Harkness, who at the time was also funding the residential college system at Yale, and commissioned James Gamble Rogers, Harkness' favorite architect, to draw up plans for the new library. Rogers' ambitious plan to complete University Hall also included a bridge connecting it with Low. It was never realized, however, as large portions of University Hall would have had to be rebuilt in order to accommodate the extra weight of the books, and the project was deemed too expensive.

In December 1930, Butler changed his request to Harkness, now asking him to fund a completely new building to be placed on South Field, facing Low Library from across 116th Street. Rogers arrived at his final design in April 1931, and Harkness agreed to provide $4 million towards its construction. Though Rogers' previous projects at Yale and Northwestern University had largely been Collegiate Gothic, his design for the new library was in the Neoclassical style in order for it to fit within the context established by McKim, Mead & White, who had designed most of the other buildings on Columbia's campus. Construction began in 1931, and the building was completed in 1934. Upon its completion, a giant slide was used to transport the 22 miles of books in Low to the new library.

Shortly after construction began, Butler proposed naming the building after Alexander Hamilton, arguing that "Hamilton remains, after all the years that have passed, the most distinguished alumnus of Columbia in any of the stages of its history." However, the trustees of the university insisted on naming it after Butler himself. As it would have been inappropriate to name a building after him while he still served as president, the library was given the placeholder name of "South Hall" until 1946, a year after Butler's retirement, when it was renamed to Butler Library.

The School of Library Service was housed in Butler Library.

=== Recent history ===
The Lawrence A. Wien Reference Room, the main reading room of Butler Library

Butler Library has been the site of several notable protests around the names on the inscriptions on its façade, which are exclusively white and male. On commencement day in 1989, several students attempted to unfurl a banner above the main inscription containing the names of prominent female authors including Sappho, Virginia Woolf, and Sor Juana Inés de la Cruz, all of whom were white. The banner was quickly taken down by the university administration, though it reappeared the next fall, and in 1994 to commemorate Women's History Month. A new banner was placed above the inscription in 2019 as a piece of protest art with the endorsement of the Columbia University Libraries, this one containing the names of women authors of color, including Toni Morrison, Maya Angelou, and Zora Neale Hurston.

The 2016 decision to place a copy of Reclining Figure 1969–70, a bronze sculpture by Henry Moore, in front of Butler Library was protested by students, who described the statue as "ugly" and "kind of evil". In particular, students complained that the statue would "throw off [South Lawn]'s Versailles-like symmetry" and "interrupt ...the architectural harmony" of Butler Plaza. Following the protests, the university administration decided to change its location to the lawn in front of Havemeyer Hall and Mathematics Hall.

The Columbia tradition of Orgo Night took place each semester in Butler 209, a large reading room in the library, where the Columbia University Marching Band would hold a performance in order to distract students from studying on the night before the organic chemistry final. The marching band was banned from the building in 2016, and the tradition was discontinued entirely following the disbandment of the band in 2020.

On May 7, 2025, in the context of student protests at the university demanding its disinvestment from Israel amid the Gaza genocide, student protesters occupied Room 301, the main reading room of Butler Library, and named it the "Basel Al-Araj Popular University" for the Palestinian activist and writer Bassel al-Araj.

== Design ==
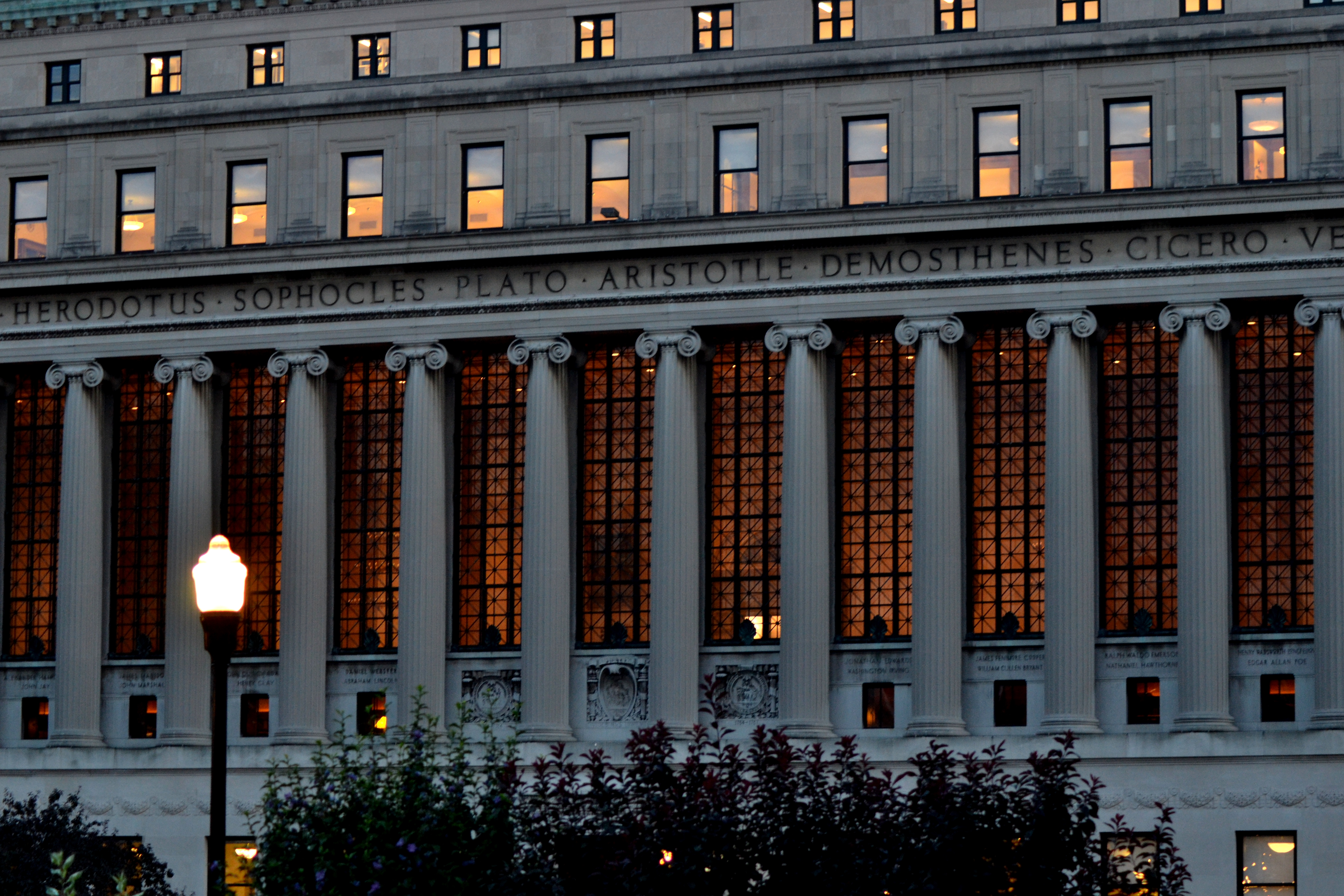
The Butler Library colonnade, above which are the names inscribed on the building's frieze

Butler Library was built in the Neoclassical style. The building is ten stories tall, with two small wings on either side with brick façades in a Flemish bond pattern and limestone trim, intended to connect it visually with the rest of the Columbia campus. The building's façade is adorned with a three-story colonnade of fourteen columns of the Ionic order which echoes that of Low Library, copper lanterns, and cast iron marquees.

Above the library's colonnade are inscribed the names of male writers, philosophers, and thinkers from Europe, many of which are represented in the university's Core Curriculum. The panels along the front façade of the library are also inscribed with the names of prominent American writers and statesmen. The names were selected by Nicholas Butler, as were the quotations which decorate the main rooms of the library.

The large mural in the entrance lobby, titled Videbimus Lumen, (based on the university's motto In Lumine Tuo Videbimus Lumen, or In Thy Light Shall We See Light) was painted in 1934 by Eugene Francis Savage. The composition is anchored by the figure of Athena, echoing the large Alma Mater sculpture in front of Low Library in the center of the campus. The mural contains references to light, social struggle, fascism, and the architecture of Columbia and New York City.

== In popular culture ==
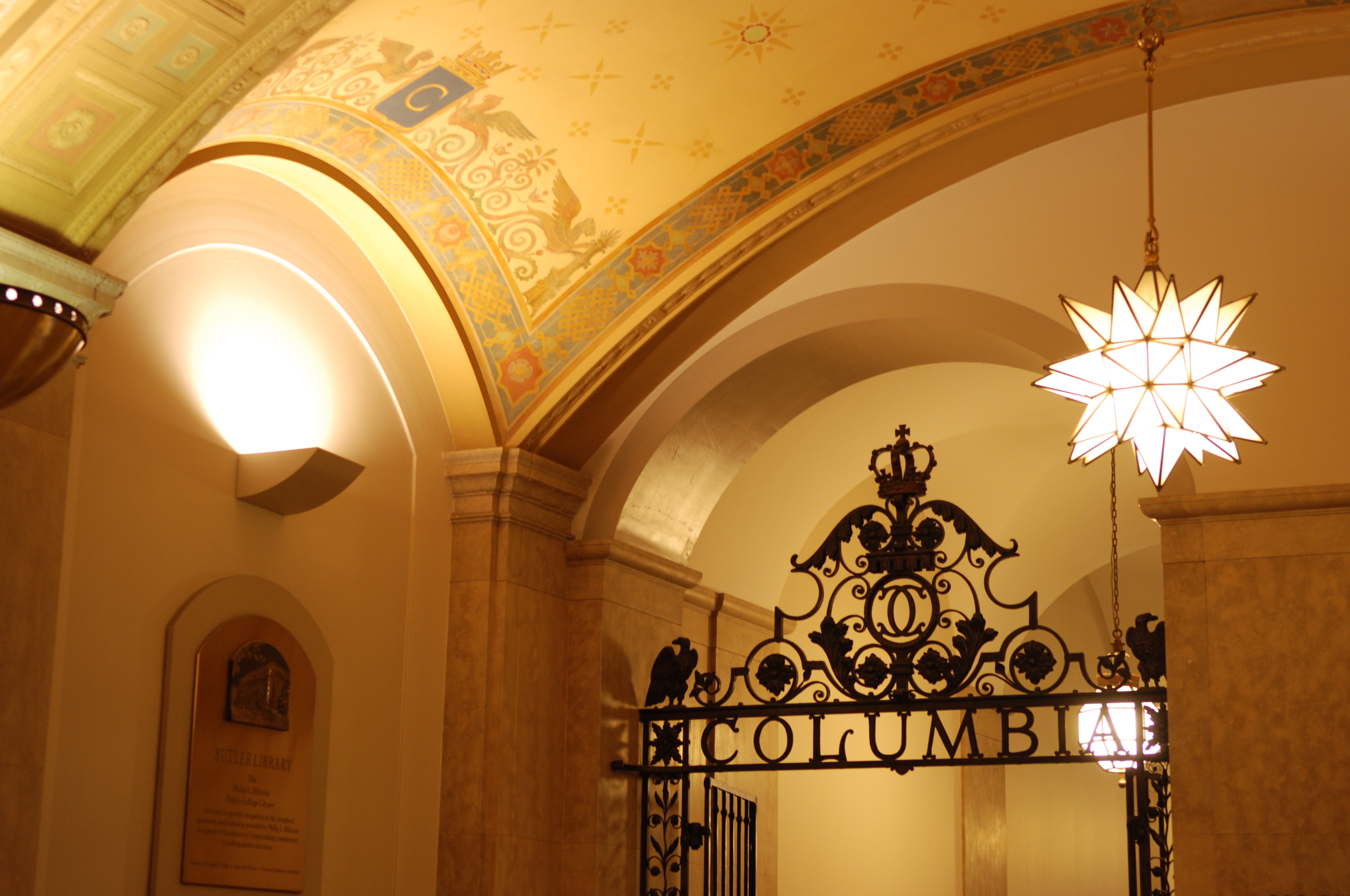
The lobby of Butler Library

Several books and screenplays have been written in Butler, including Nobel Prize‑winning novelist Orhan Pamuk's The Black Book and the script for the film Capote. It also plays a role in Paul Auster's 2009 novel Invisible: the novel's main protagonist, Adam Walker, takes a job as a page in the library's stacks. This section of the novel is set in 1967 when the stacks were closed to library users. The library is also referenced in Erica Jong's Fear of Flying.

The library also appears in the 1984 supernatural comedy film Ghostbusters. The exterior is shown in the background on the film's title card.

The Raven Mantel, the mantelpiece and last remnant of the room in which Edgar Allan Poe penned his most famous poem, "The Raven", was acquired by Columbia in 1908. It is currently installed in the Rare Book and Manuscript Library, on the 6th floor of Butler Library.

== See also ==
- Columbia Center for Oral History Research
- Rare Book & Manuscript Library
