= Papyrus Oxyrhynchus 297 =

Greek papyrus fragment

Papyrus Oxyrhynchus 297 (P. Oxy. 297 or P. Oxy. II 297) is a fragment of a Letter concerning a Property Return, in Greek. It was discovered in Oxyrhynchus. The manuscript was written on papyrus in the form of a sheet. It was written at 23 July 54. Currently it is housed in the library of the Columbia University (Rare Book & Manuscript Library) in New York City.

== Description ==
The measurements of the fragment are 316 by 94 mm.

The document was written by Ammonius and was addressed to his father. P. Oxy. 336 is another letter from the same Ammonius to his father.

== See also ==
- Oxyrhynchus Papyri
