= Lillian Goldman Law Library =

Law library of Yale Law School

Coordinates: 41.3116°N 72.9281°W

Lillian Goldman Law Library in Memory of Sol Goldman
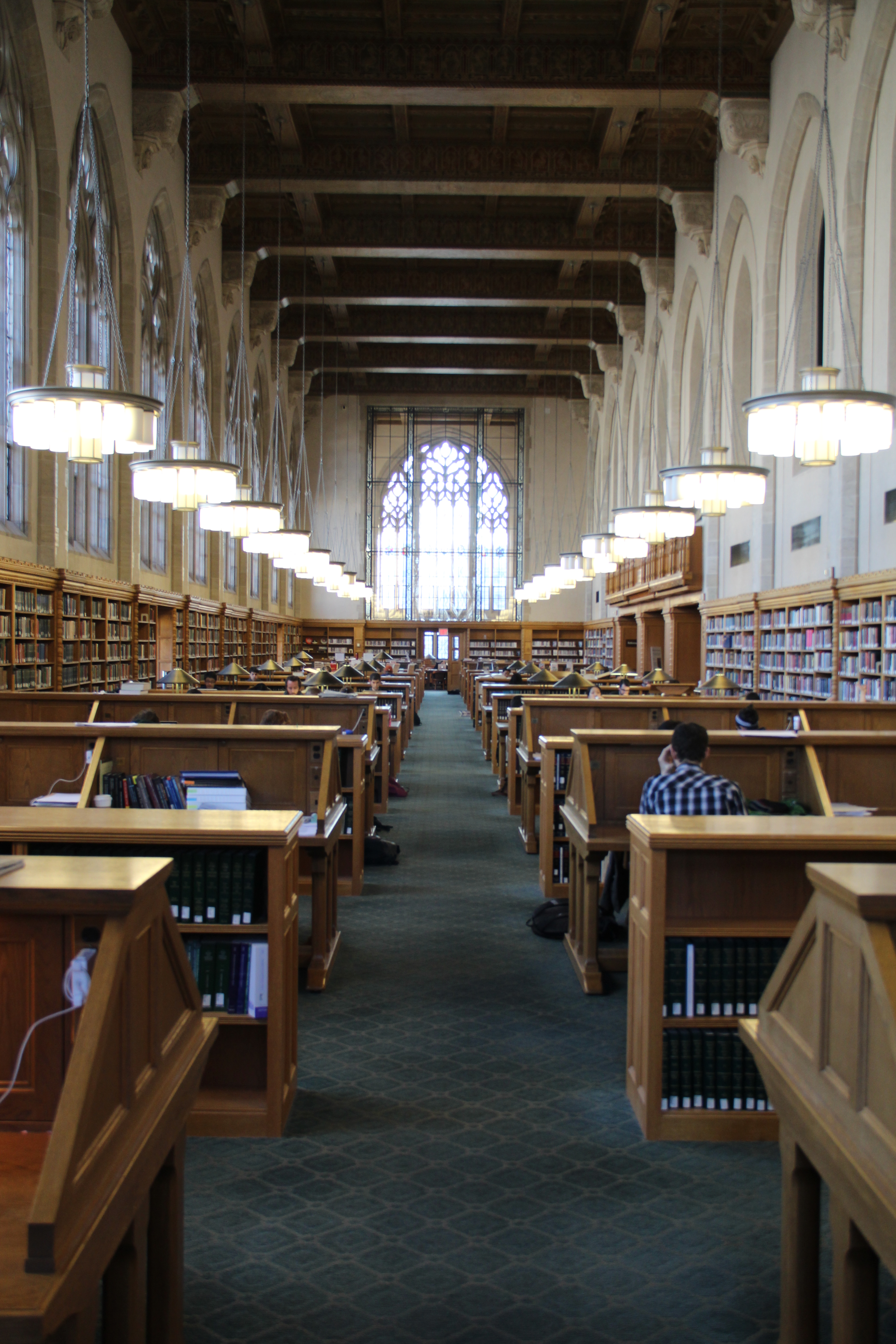
- Reading Room of Lillian Goldman Law Library
- Location: New Haven, Connecticut, United States
- Type: Law library

Collection
- Size: 800,000 volumes

Other information
- Website: library.law.yale.edu

The Lillian Goldman Law Library in Memory of Sol Goldman (previously known as Yale Law Library) is the law library of Yale University. It primarily serves Yale Law School.

It is located in the Sterling Law Building and has almost 800,000 volumes of print materials and about 10,000 active serial titles, in which there are 200,000 volumes of foreign and international law materials. In 1992, the law library was renamed following a US$20 million donation by Lillian Goldman, widow of real estate magnate Sol Goldman.

== Facilities ==
The library is contained within five stories on the eastern wing of the Sterling Law Building, completed in 1931 and designed by James Gamble Rodgers. The library's main reading room, named for the Class of 1964, is located on the library's third story. Employing the Collegiate Gothic style used throughout the law school campus, it is modeled after the King's College Chapel at the University of Cambridge.

In addition to the library's main body, two annex levels of bookstacks are contained below Beinecke Plaza, and infrequently used items are contained in the Yale University Library Shelving Facility in Hamden, Connecticut.

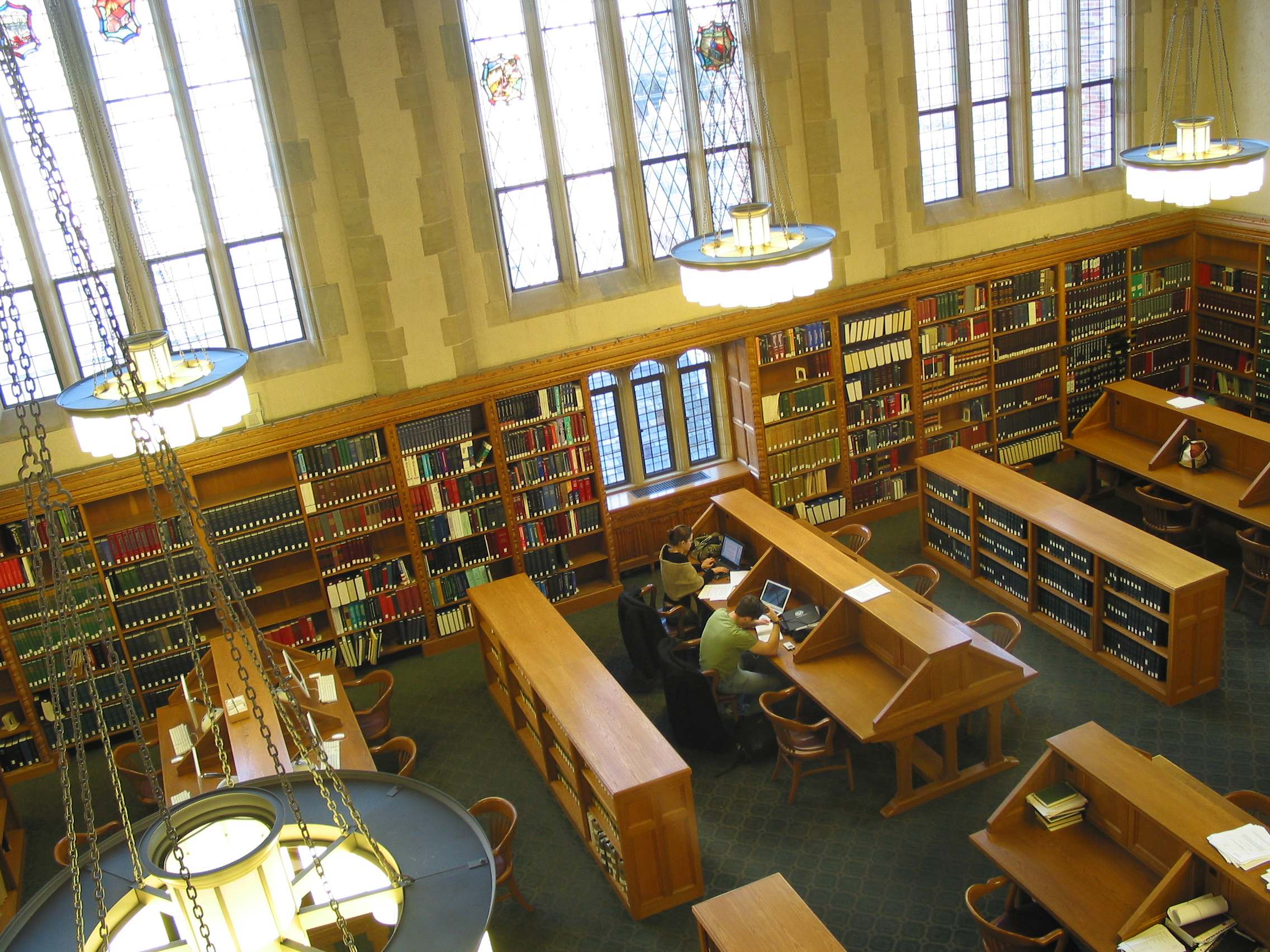
View of Reading Room from above

Projects run by the library include the Avalon Project.

== Anecdotes ==
Hillary Rodham and Bill Clinton first met there.
