= Columbia University School of Library Service =

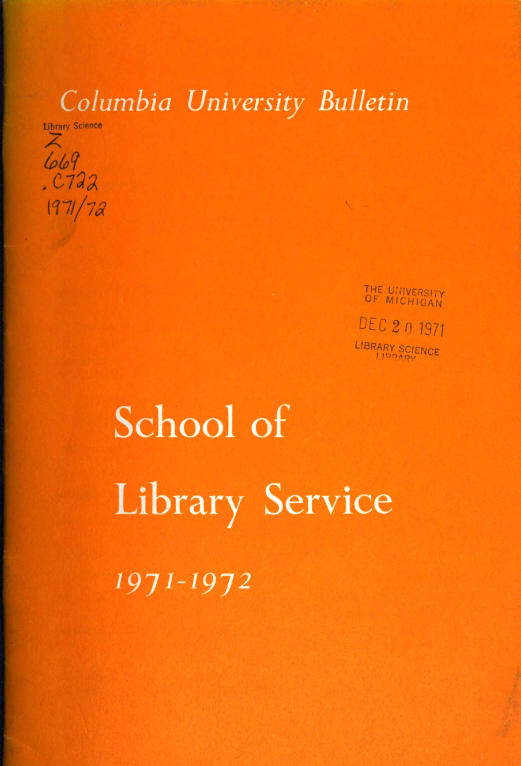
- Former names: Columbia College School of Library Economy (1887–1889); New York State Library School (1889–1926)
- Type: Private
- Active: January 5, 1887–June 30, 1992
- Founder: Melvil Dewey
- Parent institution: Columbia University
- Dean: Charles C. Williamson; Carl M. White; Robert D. Leigh; Jack Dalton; Richard L. Darling; Robert Wedgeworth
- Location: Butler Library, Manhattan, New York City, New York, United States
- Campus: Urban

The Columbia University School of Library Service was the librarianship school from 1887 to 1992 at Columbia University in New York City. It was closed in 1992 due to the university's budget crisis.

It was founded by Melvil Dewey and began operation in 1887 as the Columbia College School of Library Economy and as such is considered to have been the first library school in the world. In 1889, the school departed Columbia and became the New York State Library School, located in Albany, New York. Then in 1926, it returned to Columbia University as the Columbia University School of Library Service.

In its first few decades, the school usually awarded additional bachelor's degrees, but beginning in 1948, it granted mostly Master of Library Science degrees, as well as a number of doctoral degrees. The school's enrollment fluctuated over time, reaching a peak of over a thousand students in the late 1930s but more commonly being in the several hundreds. During the 1970s and 1980s, two unique programs were developed at the school, one for the training of rare book and special collections librarians and the other regarding the conservation and preservation of paper.

In 1990, amidst a budget crisis, the university decided that the library school no longer fit into its overall plans, and it was closed in 1992. Nonetheless, in its time, as the New York Times wrote, it was "one of the most prestigious library schools in the nation." As one scholar has said, the school "came to exercise a profound impact on the library profession." And as a history of it has stated, "The School of Library Service and its [Columbia and Albany] predecessors have influenced training for librarianship all over the world."

== Columbia College School of Library Economy ==
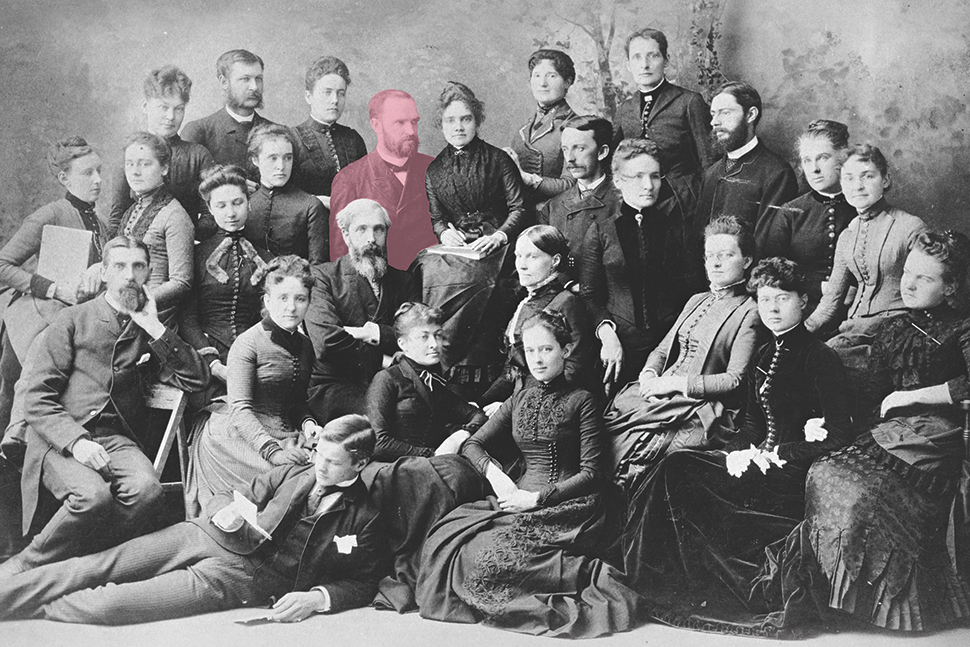
The class of 1888 of the School of Library Economy at Columbia College (Dewey is shaded in color)

In 1883, Melvil Dewey had become librarian-in-chief of Columbia College in New York City, with one of his goals being the creation of a library school there. Indeed, Dewey had been mentioning the need for a library school since 1879. Heretofore, librarians were usually trained through the apprenticeship, the method that Dewey's rival William Frederick Poole advocated. Dewey's idea of creating a school at Columbia was encouraged by most of the members of the American Library Association, with Poole being a vocal exception. Dewey's friendship with Columbia's president, Frederick A. P. Barnard, was a key factor in the arrangement moving forward. In May 1884, the trustees of the college approved a resolution to create the school.

Thus, operation of the Columbia College School of Library Economy was underway. In Spring 1886, Dewey began publishing notices about the school in order to recruit students. The new school would admit women, which caused consternation among Columbia traditionalists. It was located on Columbia's 49th Street campus of that time, in a spare room above the chapel. Its staff included regular Columbia College professors.

Its first sessions began on January 5, 1887. There were twenty students in the initial class, with seventeen of them being women. There were no students known to be African American. The first classes used a few "practice books" for training. The new school encompassed vocational education of library practices, but how much this was mixed with theoretical underpinning or other forms of intellectual inquiry has been the subject of historical scholarly debate. In any case, along with Dewey's founding of the trade publication Library Journal in 1876, the founding of the school marked the beginning of the professionalization of the library science field.

Barnard resigned from the Columbia presidency in mid-1888 due to poor health. This led to Dewey losing his political support in the university, especially among those who objected to the presence of women, those who questioned the value of having a library school in the first place, and those who did not appreciate Dewey's overbearing and boasting manner.

At the end of 1888, Dewey resigned from Columbia and accepted an offer from the Board of Regents of the University of the State of New York, becoming the librarian of the New York State Library, a position located in the state capitol of Albany. The School of Library Economy went with him, in a transaction agreed to by the Trustees of Columbia and the Board of Regents. In April 1889, it opened as the New York State Library School.

== New York State Library School ==
The New York State Library School kept much of the curriculum of the Columbia school intact. The first African American graduated from the school in 1900. Edwin H. Anderson replaced Dewey as director of the school in 1906; he was followed by James Ingersoll Wyer in 1908, who held that post for the remainder of the time in Albany.

A fire at the state capitol devastated much of the state library in 1911, but classes were continued at the New York State Normal College until a new building was completed the following year. The level of budgetary support from the state for the library school was never substantial and the financial situation became more acute by the early 1920s, leading to a series of discussions with the conclusion being that the school should return to its origins.

== Columbia University School of Library Service ==
=== Back to Columbia ===
In 1926, the School of Library Service was created as a professional school at what is now Columbia University, with the new entity incorporating not just the New York State Library School in Albany but also the training school run by the New York Public Library. Funding for the school came via a grant from the Carnegie Corporation of New York. The Albany school had some 6,000 books; they and other physical assets of it were transferred to Columbia.

The initial director of the school was Charles C. Williamson, a position which would subsequently become known as the dean of the school (the same person was often also the director of Columbia University Libraries). The school had six faculty members with professorial rank as well as additional lecturers who were librarians at either Columbia University or the New York Public Library. Compared to its earlier incarnation at Columbia, more theoretical educational materials were introduced. The school was initially mostly located in East Hall on the Morningside Heights campus, with classrooms located in the Business Building, later to be known as Dodge Hall, and library materials scattered among several sites.

The American Correspondence School of Librarianship, located in Syracuse, New York, was absorbed into Columbia University and the School of Library Service in 1928.

=== Expanded quarters ===
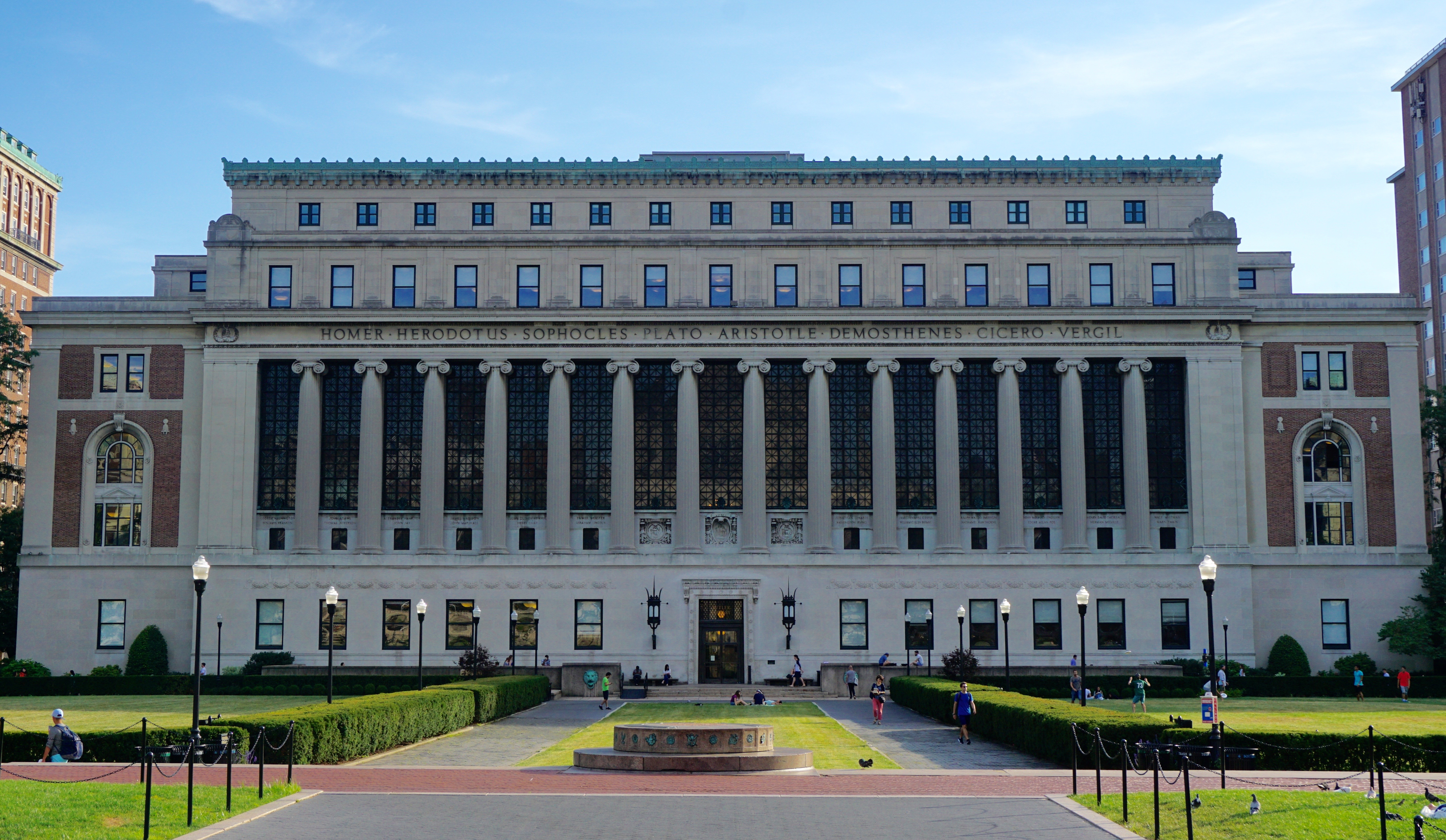
For most of its existence, the School of Library Service was located in the Butler Library building

By the early 1930s, the Columbia school was one of the five major library schools in the United States, with the others being the University of Chicago Graduate Library School, the University of Illinois Graduate School of Library Science, the University of Michigan School of Library Science, and the University of California, Berkeley School of Librarianship.

Then in 1934–35, when South Hall, later to be known as Butler Library, opened, the school moved into it. The added space was a great improvement, as by then the school had a total of 783 full-time and part-time students, making it the largest library school in the nation (a rank it would maintain for some number of years). Having the library school housed in a same structure as the university's main library was also beneficial; as Dean Williamson said, "Quite literally, the library is for the library student a laboratory".

Around the same time, the school's curriculum was revised to allow more advanced study for those who already had knowledge in specific areas. The new curriculum also sought to train future librarians into seeing the public library as a center of a community's adult learning efforts. The library school reached its peak enrollment figure during the 1938–39 academic year, with 1,071 students.

The School of Library Service was influential in establishing new institutes of training around the world. For instance, the library school at the University of Cape Town was created by a 1938 graduate of the School of Library Services, who used the Columbia school as a model.

Upon Williamson's retirement in 1943, Carl M. White became dean of the School of Library Service.

=== Revised degree programs ===
The programs at the school leading to degrees were revised in 1948: Heretofore most degrees awarded had been that of an additional, "fifth-year" bachelor's degree, with a few going on to get a master's degree; both of those were dropped and were replaced by a new master's degree representing one full year of post-bachelor's work. The doctoral program at the School of Library Service also started in 1948, joining the University of Chicago Graduate Library School, which had begun its doctoral program in 1926. The first such degree was granted in 1953, and the School of Library Service's program would become one of the most active such programs in the nation, granting as many as eleven doctoral degrees in a year. Overall, throughout its history, the School of Library Service saw 166 doctoral degrees awarded.

Robert D. Leigh was acting dean of the school from 1954 to 1956 and then dean until 1959. He was followed by Jack Dalton, who was dean of the school from 1959 to 1970. By 1961, enrollment in the school was 365 students.

Richard L. Darling was the next dean of the school, being named to that position in 1970.

=== Regular and special programs ===
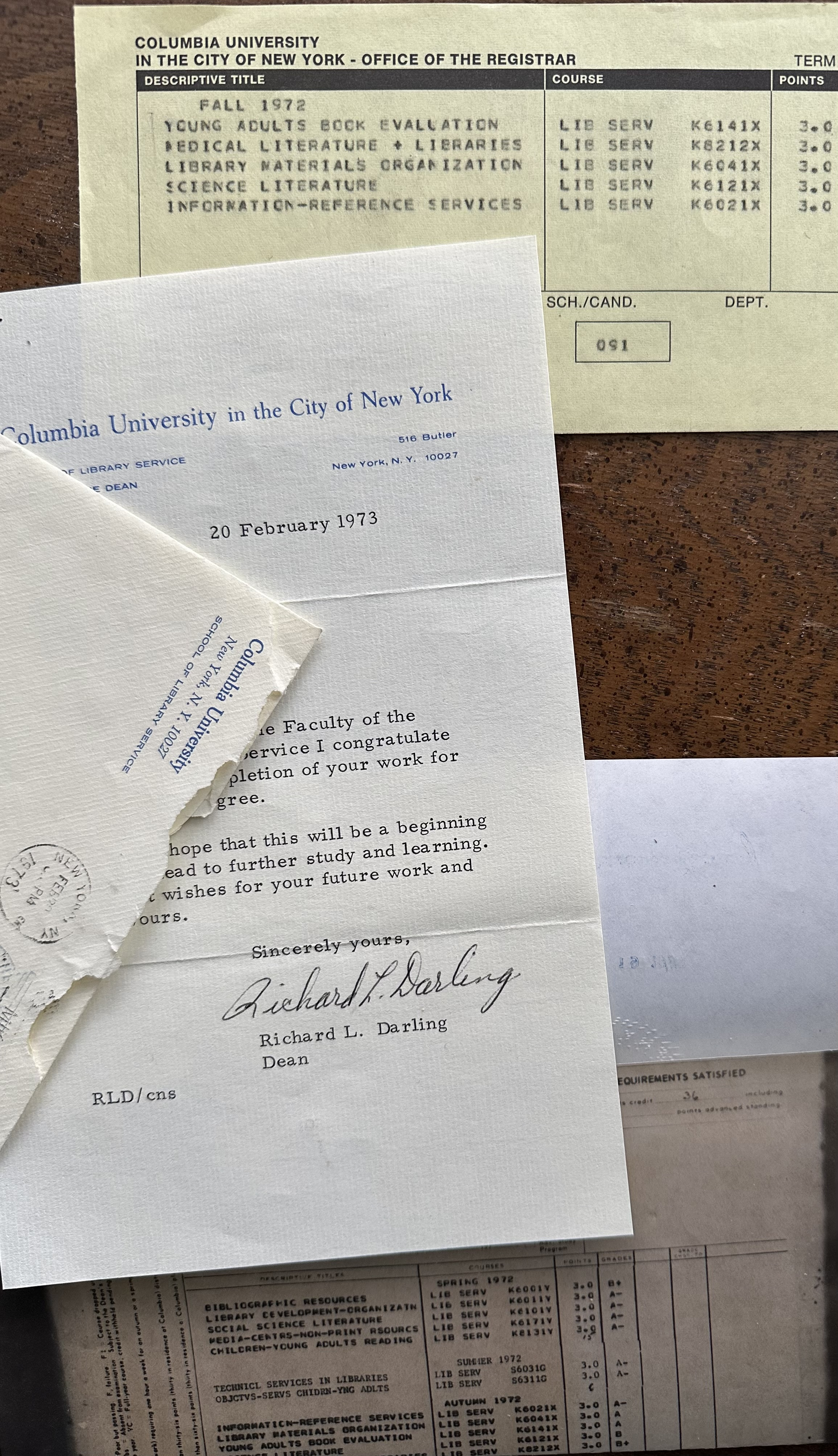
Some student-related documents from the Columbia University School of Library Service in the early 1970s

By the early 1970s, the school offered around 60 different courses. When done full-time, the requirements for the Master of Library Science degree was met by two academic semesters as well as a summer session. Students could enter the program at the start of any of the fall, spring, or summer terms. For those working at the same time, the degree could be accomplished over as many as three years. Once gaining a master's degree, the most common place where students found employment was in academic libraries, followed by public libraries, various kinds of special libraries, and school libraries.

The core faculty of around a dozen professors of various rank was augmented by adjunct professors and lecturers, as well as by lecturers from outside academic, governmental, and corporate institutions, and by visiting lecturers for the summer session. Among the noted core faculty members of the school was Frances E. Henne, who from the 1950s into the 1970s was a professor there; she taught a number of courses and was a recognized authority on children's libraries and school library services. Maurice Tauber was a professor at the school for 32 years, and became renowned in the subjects of cataloging, classification, and similar processes. During his time at Columbia, Theodore C. Hines wrote extensively on the use of computer-based indexing for library catalogs.

The School of Library Service had space on the fifth and sixth floors of Butler Library. It had its own collection of library and librarianship materials, that would eventually grow to some 110,000 volumes; it was considered the most extensive such collection anywhere in the world.

In 1972, Dean Darling invited Terry Belanger to develop a master's program for the training of rare book and special collections librarians. This included the Book Arts Press, a bibliographical laboratory for various studies concerned with the history of books and printing, descriptive bibliography, the antiquarian book trade, and rare book and special collections librarianship. Then in 1983, Belanger founded the Rare Book School at Columbia, which offered non-credit courses on the history of books, manuscripts, and related objects. Belanger's activities would stimulate the development of rare book librarianship as a profession.

The School of Library Service had the only program in the world for preserving paper. The Conservation Education Program was created in 1981 by Paul N. Banks, and students going through its full curriculum would earn an Endorsement of Specialization in Administration of Preservation Programs in Libraries and Archives.

Between the mid-1970s and the mid-1980s, enrollment at the library school underwent a decline, to around 250 students. Darling announced his retirement in 1984, which would become effective the following year, and in 1985, Robert Wedgeworth became dean of the school. Wedgeworth led a drive to modernize the school's approach to technology and information services.

By 1990, the School of Library Service had 10 faculty members and 244 students. It was the smallest of Columbia's schools on its main campus.

=== Closing ===
In April 1990, news emerged that the university was considering closing the library school. The university as a whole was under substantial financial and budgetary pressure. Butler Library was intended to undergo renovation and expansion, and there was no room for the library school in those plans. Faculty in other parts of the university questioned whether professional education had a place in a high-research institution, echoing a long-running debate over whether library and information science is a professional or a research discipline. Questions about the role that library schools would play during the era of the information superhighway also played a part.

Dean Wedgeworth disputed many of the characterizations about the school, and would ascribe the move against it as partially due to bureaucratic struggles within the university. However, many librarians conceded that their field had an image problem, being in that they were associated with older technologies in a female-dominated occupation. Several other highly-ranked library schools had closed in prior years, including the aforementioned one at the University of Chicago as well as ones at the University of Southern California and Vanderbilt University, and library school education had largely become the province of public schools, not private ones. After some debate, the Columbia University Senate passed a resolution affirming the high academic quality and purpose of the School of Library Service, but stopped short of endorsing a stronger resolution calling for the preservation of the school.

In June 1990, Columbia announced that it had gone ahead with its decision and that the School of Library Service would be closing, in a phasing out that would take place over two years in order to allow existing students to complete their degrees. In the announcement, university provost Jonathan R. Cole said that the school was "valuable but not vital" and that keeping it could "come only at the cost of sacrificing greater priorities." Patricia Wilson Berger, the president of the American Library Association, condemned the closure, saying, "I simply cannot accept the rationale" and adding, "I think it's outrageous ... to see an institution of such stature just shut down."

The university remained in poor financial shape as the library school was disassembled, with eventually Columbia's president Michael I. Sovern stepping down. Following the completion of the 1991–92 academic year, the School of Library Service officially closed on June 30, 1992.

Columbia looked to see if the library school could be moved to another university. At one point, there was an agreement, signed in December 1991, to move it to the City University of New York. However, it appears that this arrangement fell through and no move happened. Two programs within the school were moved independently of the fate of it as a whole. Belanger's rare books program was moved to the University of Virginia at Charlottesville, where the Rare Books School continues to operate as of 2025. The Conservation Education Program was moved to the University of Texas at Austin, where it lasted until 2009.

In 2002, Columbia University Libraries undertook a project to save and digitize the School of Library Service's old library collection, which was said to be "the strongest historical collection in the world for materials relating to libraries and librarianship."

In 2006, essential parts of the curriculum were used to launch a new program known as the Master of Science in Information and Knowledge Strategy. The foundation of information science is still there, and the program continues to be a pioneer in the use of data and knowledge in organizations as well as hybrid learning.

== See also ==
- Category:Columbia University School of Library Service alumni
