= Engineering Institution of Macedonia =

Engineering Institution of Macedonia is Macedonia's regulatory authority for registration of chartered and Incorporated engineers and technicians, holding a register of these and providing advice to students, engineers, employers and academic institutions on the standards for registration and procedures for registration. It is responsible for the accreditation of educational and training programmes, delegating this responsibility to Licensed Member institutions.

== Engineer's Ring ==
The Engineering Institution of Macedonia awards the best graduate students with Engineers Ring. The ring is a crown of oak leaves on top of which is embedded sign of Engineering Institution of Macedonia.

== Divisions ==
- Association of architects of Macedonia
- Macedonian Association of Structural Engineers
- Association of thermal engineers
- Society of thermal engineers
- Association of Physics Engineers
- Macedonian Energy Association
- Society for Electronics, Telecommunications, Automatics and Informatics
- Union of Geodesy Societies
- Association of Civil Engineers
- Union of electrical engineers
- Union of engineers in Forestry and wood industry
- Association of Mechanical Engineers
- Union of metallurgists
- Union of Miners and geologists
- Association of transportation engineers
- Association of Textile Engineers
- Union of Agricultural Engineers
- Association of chemists and technologists
- Horticultural Association
