= Academic grading in Venezuela =

Academic grades in Venezuela range from 0 to 20 points, with 20 being the highest possible grade. Decimal points are also sometimes used, depending on the academic institution.

Venezuelan grades are easily changed into percentages by multiplying by 5. Rounding of averages is generally done to the second decimal; hence, a 13.95 is rounded up to a 14.0, whereas a 13.94 is rounded down to a 13.9. A passing grade is usually a 10 (50%), but some schools and universities may require a higher passing grade overall, or sometimes by subject.

Some universities have different grading systems, 5 or 10 point grading scale, with or without decimals.

The following table shows the system used by the University of Illinois at Chicago for converting Venezuelan grades into American grades. Although this represents just one example, it is representative of similar scales used by other universities such as the University of South Florida and Colorado State University.

Venezuelan Grade	American Grade
16-20	A
13-15	B
10-12	C
0-9	F
