= Carl M. White =

American librarian

Carl Milton White
- Born: 1903
- Died: November 8, 1983 (aged 79–80)
- Education: Oklahoma Baptist University (BA 1925), Mercer University (MA, 1928), Cornell University (PhD.)
- Occupation: Librarian
- Employer: Columbia University Libraries

Carl Milton White (1903 – November 8, 1983) was an American librarian who served as Director of Libraries at the Columbia University Libraries. White was born in Burnett, Oklahoma, and earned a bachelor's degree from Oklahoma Baptist University (OBU) in 1925. While there he played football, basketball, and baseball. In 1925 White set a state meet record of 11-3 in the pole vault. He was inducted into the OBU Athletics Hall of Fame.

He earned a master's degree from Mercer University in 1928, a doctorate from Cornell University in 1933, and a bachelors in library service from Columbia University in 1934.

White served as director of libraries at Fisk University (1935–1938 ) and as university librarian at the University of North Carolina at Chapel Hill (1938–1940).

From 1940 to 1943 White was director of libraries and the Library School at the University of Illinois Urbana-Champaign. Concurrently (1941–1948) he edited College & Research Libraries, the journal of the Association of College and Research Libraries.

In 1943, he became chief librarian at Columbia and dean of its School of Library Service, stepping down from his librarian position in 1953 in order to focus on his role as dean.

He took leave from 1959-1961 to serve as director of the library program at Ankara University in Turkey supported by the Ford Foundation

From 1962-1967 he served as program specialist in library administration at the Ford Foundation. He assessed library planning and development in Nigeria, India and Mexico.

Later he helped develop the library collection of the University of California, San Diego from 1967 to 1971.

White died in 1983, survived by his wife Ruth Bennett and two daughters.

== Selected Publications ==
- White, Carl M. (October 1940). "The Place of the University Library in the Modern World". Educational Record. 21: 462–479.
- White, Carl M. (1961). The Origins of the American Library School. New York: Scarecrow Press.
- White, Carl M. (1969). Mexico’s Library and Information Services: A Study of Present Conditions and Needs. Totowa, N.J.: Bedminster Press.
- White, Carl M., ed. (1964). Bases of Modern Librarianship: A Study of Library Theory and Practice in Britain, Canada, Denmark, the Federal Republic of Germany, and the United States. International Series of Monographs on Library and Information Sciences. Vol. 1. Oxford: Pergamon Press.
- White, Carl M. (1976). A Historical Introduction to Library Education: Problems and Progress to 1951 (Revised and expanded edition of The Origins of the American Library School ed.). Metuchen, N.J.: Scarecrow Press.
