= Avalon Project =

Yale University digital library of law, history and diplomacy

- Website type: Digital library
- Available in: English
- Owner: Lillian Goldman Law Library
- Website: avalon.law.yale.edu
- Commercial: No

The Avalon Project is a digital library of documents relating to law, history and diplomacy. The project is part of the Yale Law School Lillian Goldman Law Library.

The project contains online electronic copies of documents dating back to the beginning of history, making it possible to study the original text of not only very famous documents such as Magna Carta, the English Bill of Rights, and the United States Bill of Rights, but also the text of less well known but significant documents which mark turning points in the history of law and rights.

The Avalon Project will mount digital documents relevant to the fields of Law, History, Economics, Politics, Diplomacy and Government. We do not intend to mount only static text but rather to add value to the text by linking to supporting documents expressly referred to in the body of the text.

— Statement of Purpose

The site has full search facilities and a facility to electronically compare the text of two documents. It also hosts Project Diana: An Online Human Rights Archive.
