= James Gamble Rogers =

American architect (1867–1947)

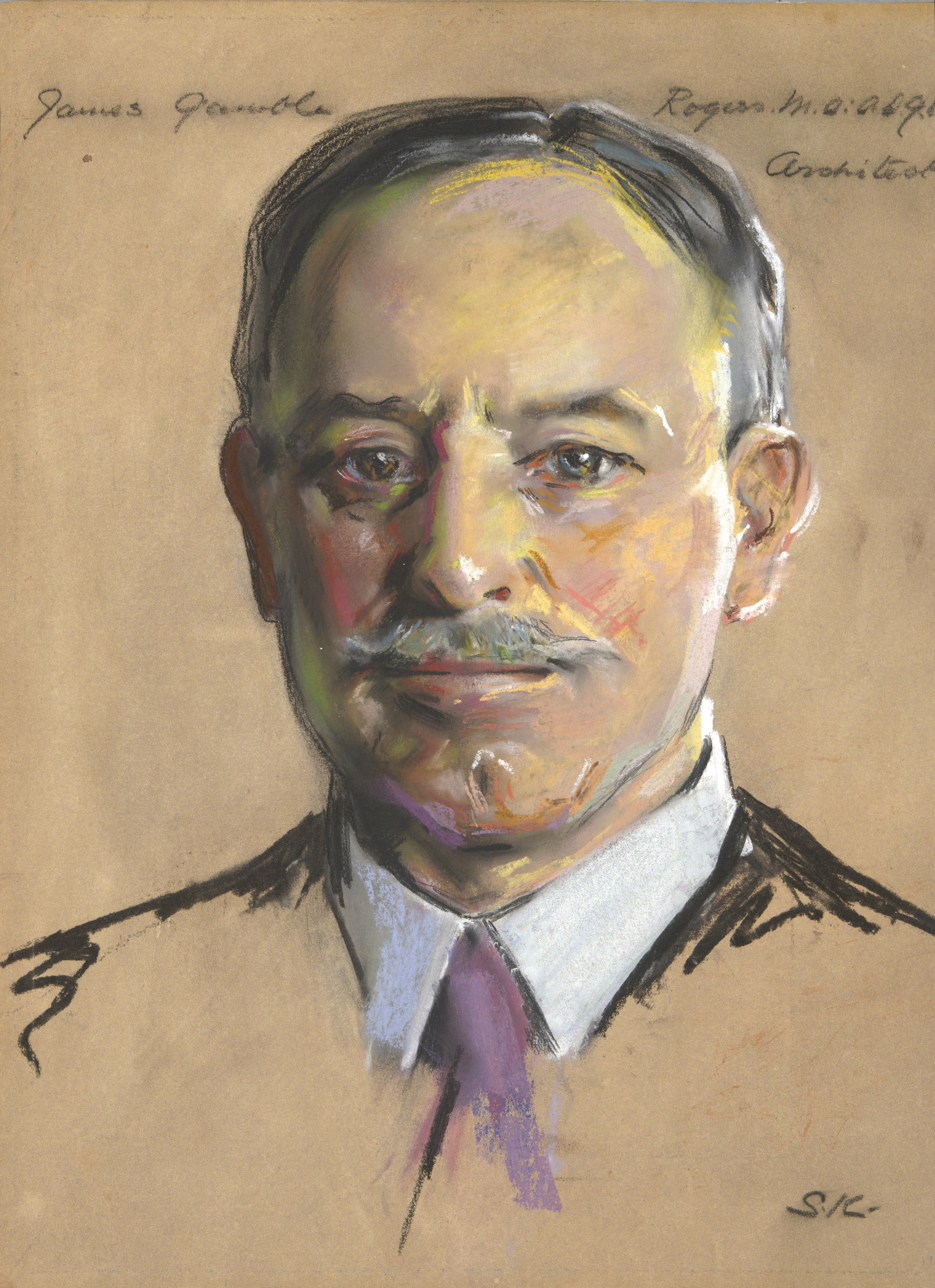
- Portrait by William Sergeant Kendall
- Born: March 3, 1867; Bryan Station, Kentucky, U.S.
- Died: October 1, 1947 (aged 80); New York City, U.S.
- Occupation: Architect
- Buildings: At Yale University: Sterling Memorial Library; Harkness Memorial Tower; Berkeley College; Jonathan Edwards College; Branford College; Saybrook College; Trumbull College; Pierson College; Davenport College; Timothy Dwight College; Sterling Law Building, home of Yale Law School; Hall of Graduate Studies; In New York City: Butler Library, Columbia University; Columbia University Medical Center, Columbia University; Memorial Sloan-Kettering Hospital; Yale Club of New York City; Elsewhere: Deering Library, Northwestern University

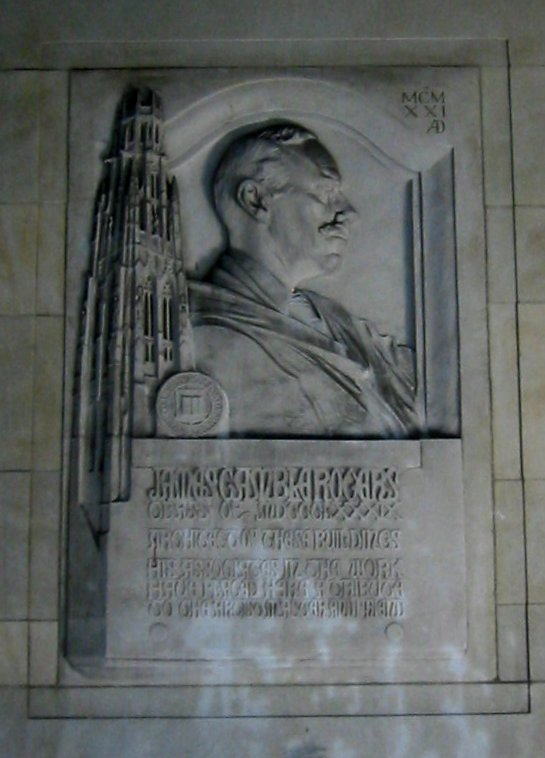
A tribute to Rogers in the Memorial Quadrangle, Lee Lawrie, sculptor.

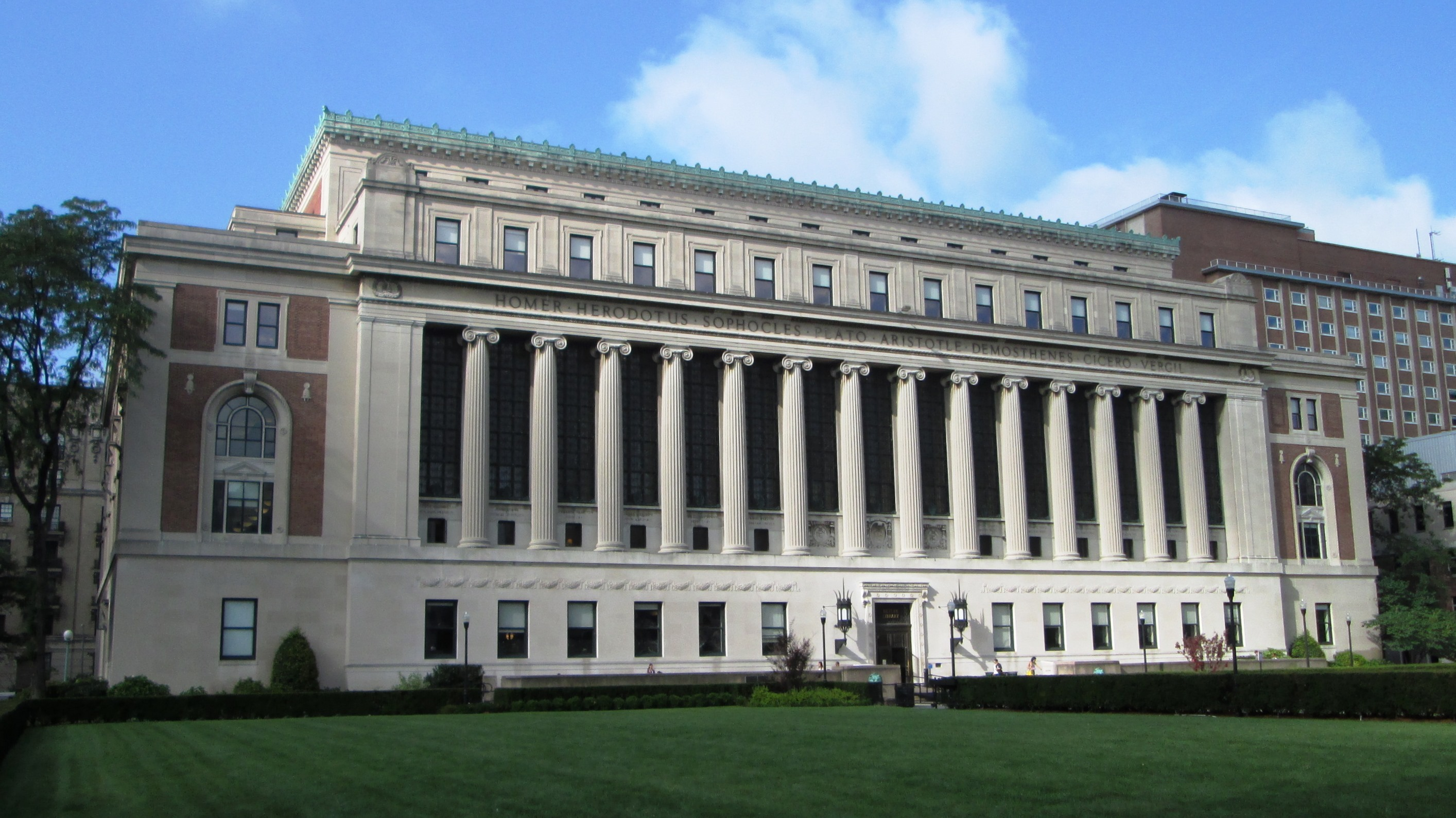
Butler Library at Columbia University

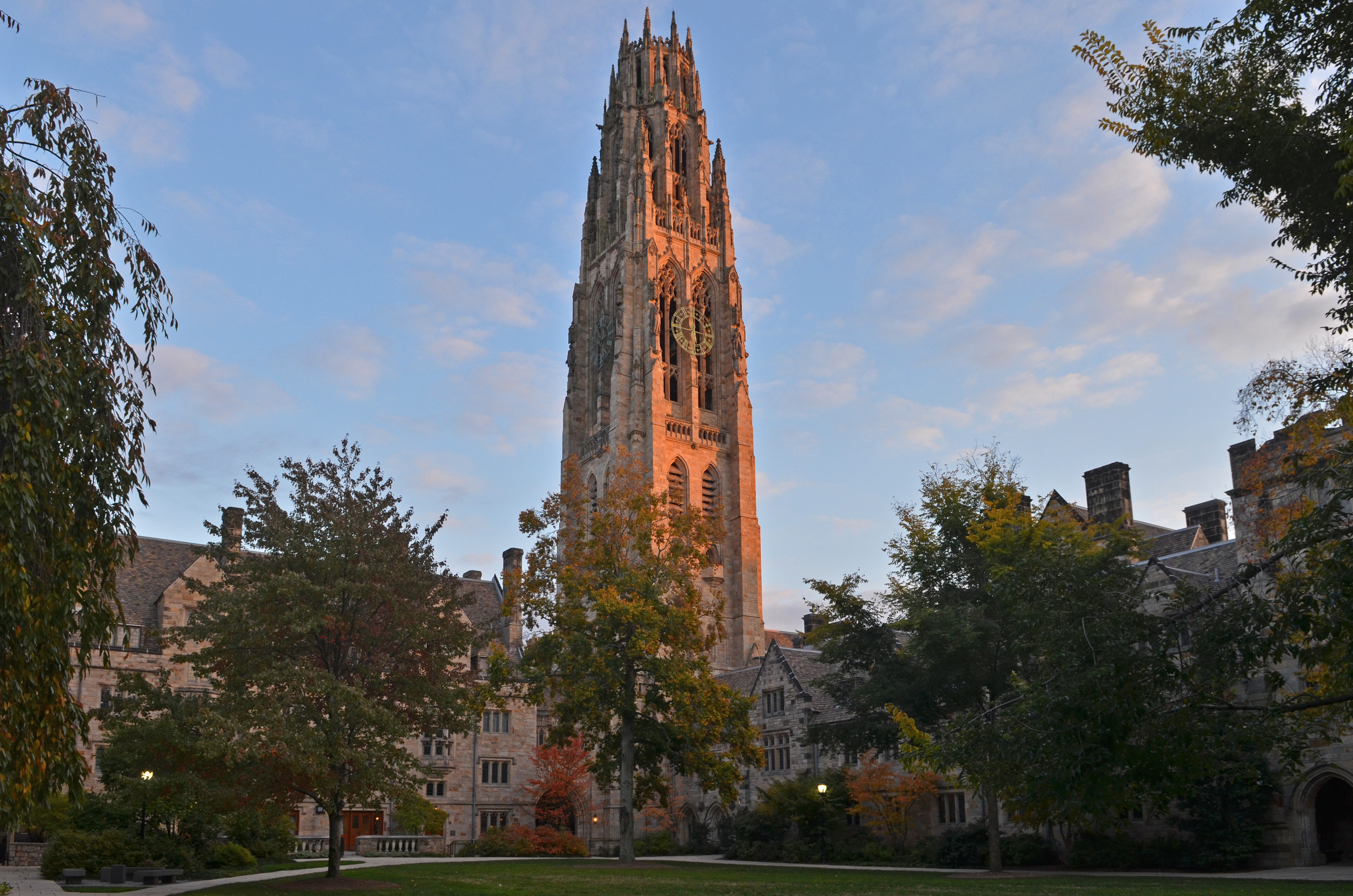
Rogers' Memorial Quadrangle at Yale University's Branford College.

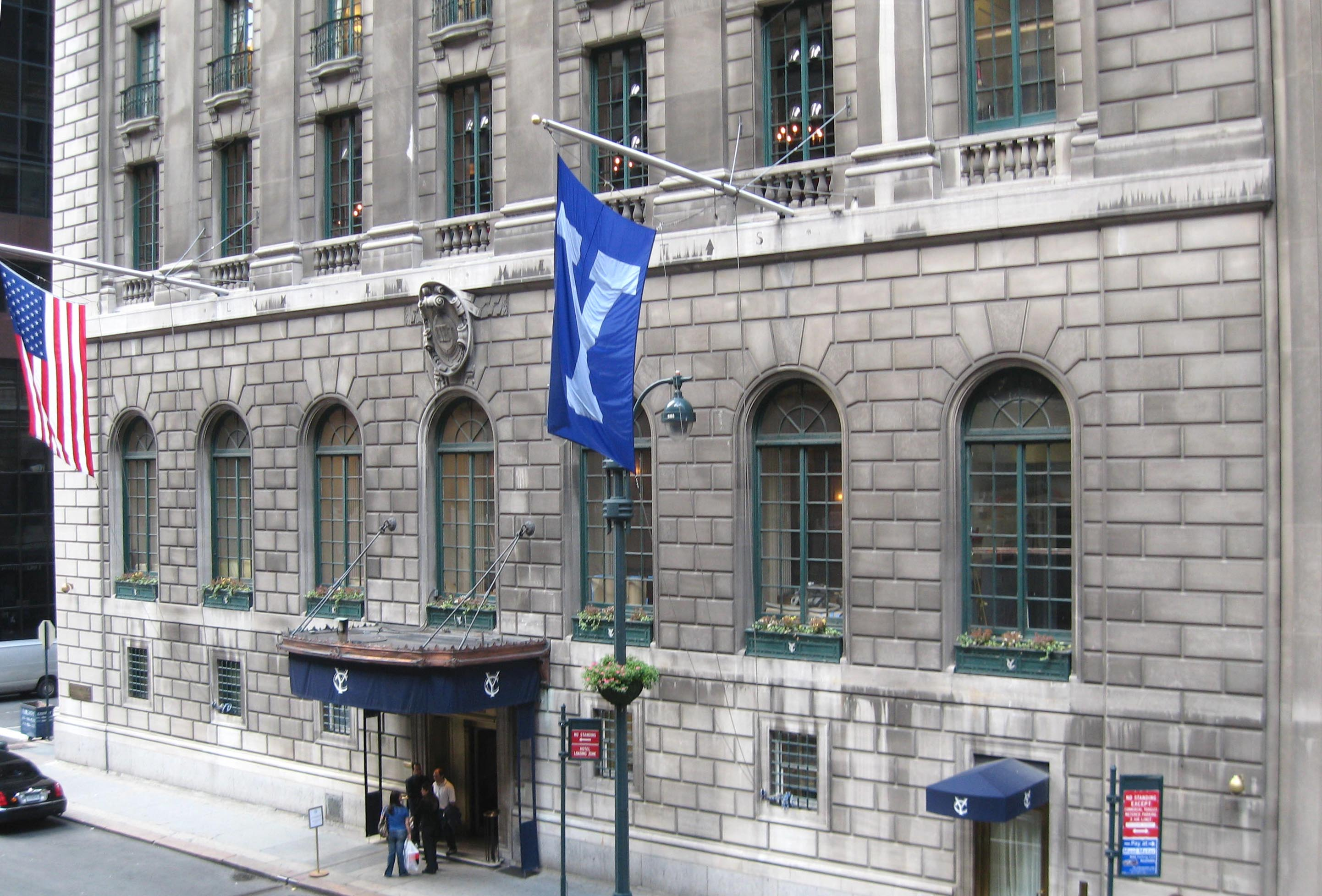
Rogers' front facade of the Yale Club of New York City.

James Gamble Rogers (March 3, 1867 – October 1, 1947) was an American architect. A proponent of what came to be known as Collegiate Gothic architecture, he is best known for his academic commissions at Yale University, Columbia University, Northwestern University, and elsewhere.

== Biography ==
Rogers was born in Bryan Station, Kentucky, on March 3, 1867, to James M. and Katharine Gamble Rogers. Rogers attended Yale University, where he contributed to The Yale Record and was a member of the senior society Scroll and Key, whose membership included several other notable architects. He received his B.A. in 1889, and is responsible for many of the Gothic Revival structures at Yale University built in the 1910s through the mid-1930s, as well as the university's master plan in 1924. He designed buildings for other universities as well, such as the Butler Library at Columbia University and several buildings at Northwestern University, notably Deering Library.

Rogers designed most of the original buildings at the Columbia-Presbyterian Medical Center (now the NewYork-Presbyterian/Columbia University Irving Medical Center), which was the world's first academic medical center.

He died in New York City on October 1, 1947.

== Legacy ==
Rogers was philanthropist Edward Harkness's favorite architect, and Harkness would often condition a gift for a new academic or medical building upon the institution's agreement to hire Rogers for the project. It is thus no coincidence that Rogers' work is abundant at Yale, Columbia and the other institutions Harkness supported lavishly. Even though Harkness admired Rogers's work, when Harkness donated a new home for Wolf's Head, his society at Yale, another architect (Bertram Goodhue) was chosen.

Rogers' Collegiate Gothic designs for Yale lent an air of instant heritage and authenticity to the campus. Rogers was criticized by other prominent Gothic-revival American architects, namely Ralph Adams Cram, for his use of steel frames underneath stone cladding, and tricks such as splashing acid on stone walls to simulate age. Rogers was also criticized by the growing Modernist movement of the time. The 1927 Sterling Memorial Library came under especially vocal attack from Yale students for its historicist spirit and its lavish use of ornament. But current opinion generally regards the building as a triumph, being both beautiful and functional.

Rogers's nephew, James Gamble Rogers II (1901–1990) was also an architect, who designed homes in Winter Park, Florida for the Rogers family architecture firm Rogers, Lovelock and Fritz, where Rogers II's son John (Jack) Rogers is a principal architect.

Rogers II's other son, James Gamble Rogers IV (1937–1991) was also trained as an architect. After working in the family firm as a young man, James Gamble Rogers IV decided to pursue his passion for music. He became a noted Florida folksinger, composer and guitarist, now memorialized by the Gamble Rogers Memorial Foundation, Gamble Rogers Middle School, and Gamble Rogers Memorial State Recreation Area at Flagler Beach on Florida's east coast.

James Gamble Rogers' architectural drawings and photographs are now held in the Dept. of Drawings & Archives in the Avery Architectural and Fine Arts Library at Columbia University in New York. A number of his built works are listed on the National Register of Historic Places (NRHP).

== Buildings ==
- Lees Building (1893), Chicago, Illinois (now demolished)
- Hyde Park Union Church (1906), Chicago, Illinois
- Laurel Court Mansion (1907), Cincinnati, Ohio, also known as Peter G. Thomson House (residence of his aunt Laura Gamble Thomson), NRHP-listed
- The Edward S. Harkness House (1908), 1 East 75th Street at Fifth Avenue, Manhattan. Constructed as the residence of Edward and Mary Stillman Harkness in 1908. Currently the home of The Commonwealth Fund, the organization they founded for their philanthropic work. Designated a landmark in 1967.
- Shelby County Courthouse (1909), Memphis, Tennessee
- Federal Courthouse (1913), New Haven, CT.
- Plan and buildings of The H. Sophie Newcomb Memorial College (1913), Tulane University, New Orleans
- Brooks Museum of Art (1913), Memphis, Tennessee.
- The former Bridgeport High School, now City Hall (1914–16), Bridgeport, Connecticut.
- The Yale Club of New York City (1915), Midtown Manhattan.
- Burnham Park Plaza (1915), Chicago.
- Hsiang Ya Hospital (1918) in Changsa, China.
- Harkness Memorial Quadrangle (later renovated and subdivided by Rogers in 1933 into Branford and Saybrook Colleges) and Harkness Memorial Tower (1921), Yale University.
- The Goodwyn (1922), Memphis, Tennessee
- Yale's General Plan (1924)
- Bob Cook Boat House (1924), Yale University.
- English Country Estate (1926), 990 East Illinois Road, Lake Forest, Illinois
- Dyche Stadium (1926), Northwestern University (demolished in 2024).
- Wieboldt Hall (1926), Northwestern University, Chicago campus
- Methodist Church (1926), now University United Methodist Church, Chapel Hill, North Carolina
- Yeamans Hall Club (1926), Hanahan, South Carolina
- Ward Memorial Building (1926), Northwestern University, Chicago campus (funded by Elizabeth Ward in honor of her late husband, mail order and department store magnate Aaron Montgomery Ward.)
- Beta Theta Pi (1927), Fraternity Row, Yale University.
- James Gamble Rogers House (1927), 424 West Mountain Road, Ridgefield, CT, in NRHP-listed West Mountain Historic District
- Psi Upsilon (1928), later the Fence Club, Fraternity Row, Yale University
- Harkness Pavilion (1928), NewYork–Presbyterian Hospital
- Ossining High School (1928), Ossining, New York
- Vanderbilt School of Dental and Oral Surgery (1928), Columbia Presbyterian Medical Center.
- Neurological Institute of New York (1928), NewYork–Presbyterian Hospital.
- College of Physicians and Surgeons (1928), Columbia University Medical Center
- Presbyterian Hospital Building (1928), NewYork–Presbyterian Hospital.
- Joseph L. Mailman School of Public Health (1929), Columbia University Medical Center.
- School of Education (1930), New York University, Greenwich Village.
- Sterling Memorial Library (1930), Yale University.
- Delta Kappa Epsilon (1930), Fraternity Row, Yale University.
- Sterling Law Building (1931), Yale University.
- Alpha Delta Phi (1931), 215 Park Street, Fraternity Row, Yale University.
- University Theater and Drama School (1931 renovation), Yale University.
- Aetna Home Office (1931), Hartford, CT.
- Phi Gamma Delta / Vernon Hall (1932), 217 Park Street, Fraternity Row, Yale University.
- Hall of Graduate Studies (1932), Yale University.
- Jonathan Edwards College (1932) including Weir Hall addition, Yale University.
- Pierson College (1932), Yale University.
- Davenport College (1932), Yale University.
- Briton Hadden Memorial Building (1932), Yale Daily News
- Deering Library (1933), Northwestern University, Evanston campus.
- Trumbull College (1933), Yale University.
- Berkeley College (1933), Yale University.
- Butler Library (1934), Columbia University, (as South Hall; renamed in 1946 in honor of Nicholas Murray Butler, president of the university from 1902 to 1945)
- Timothy Dwight College (1935), Yale University.
- Memorial Sloan-Kettering Hospital (1939), Memorial Sloan-Kettering Medical Center.
- Scott Hall / Cahn Auditorium (1940), Northwestern University, Evanston campus.
- Harkness Chapel (1940), Connecticut College, New London.
- Harkness Hall, Clark Atlanta University, Atlanta, Ga.
- Riegel Ridge Community Center, Co. Rt. 519, approximately 1.5 mi N of NJ-PA state line, Holland Township, Milford, NJ, NRHP-listed
- Rutherford Health Department, 303 N. Church St., Murfreesboro, TN, NRHP-listed

== Sources ==
- James Gamble Rogers and the Architecture of Pragmatism, Aaron Betsky, MIT, 1994. ISBN 978-0262023818
- The Architecture of James Gamble Rogers II in Winter Park, Florida, Patrick and Debra McClane, 2004. ISBN 0-8130-2770-5
- The Campus Guide: Yale University, Patrick L. Pinnell, Princeton Architectural Press, New York, 1999. ISBN 978-1616890643
- Yale: A Pictorial History, Reuben A. Holden, New Haven, Yale University Press, 1967.
- Yale in New Haven: Architecture and Urbanism, Vincent Scully, Catherine Lynn et al., New Haven, Yale University Press, 2004, ISBN 978-0974956503
