= Riegel Ridge Community Center =

- U.S. National Register of Historic Places
- New Jersey Register of Historic Places
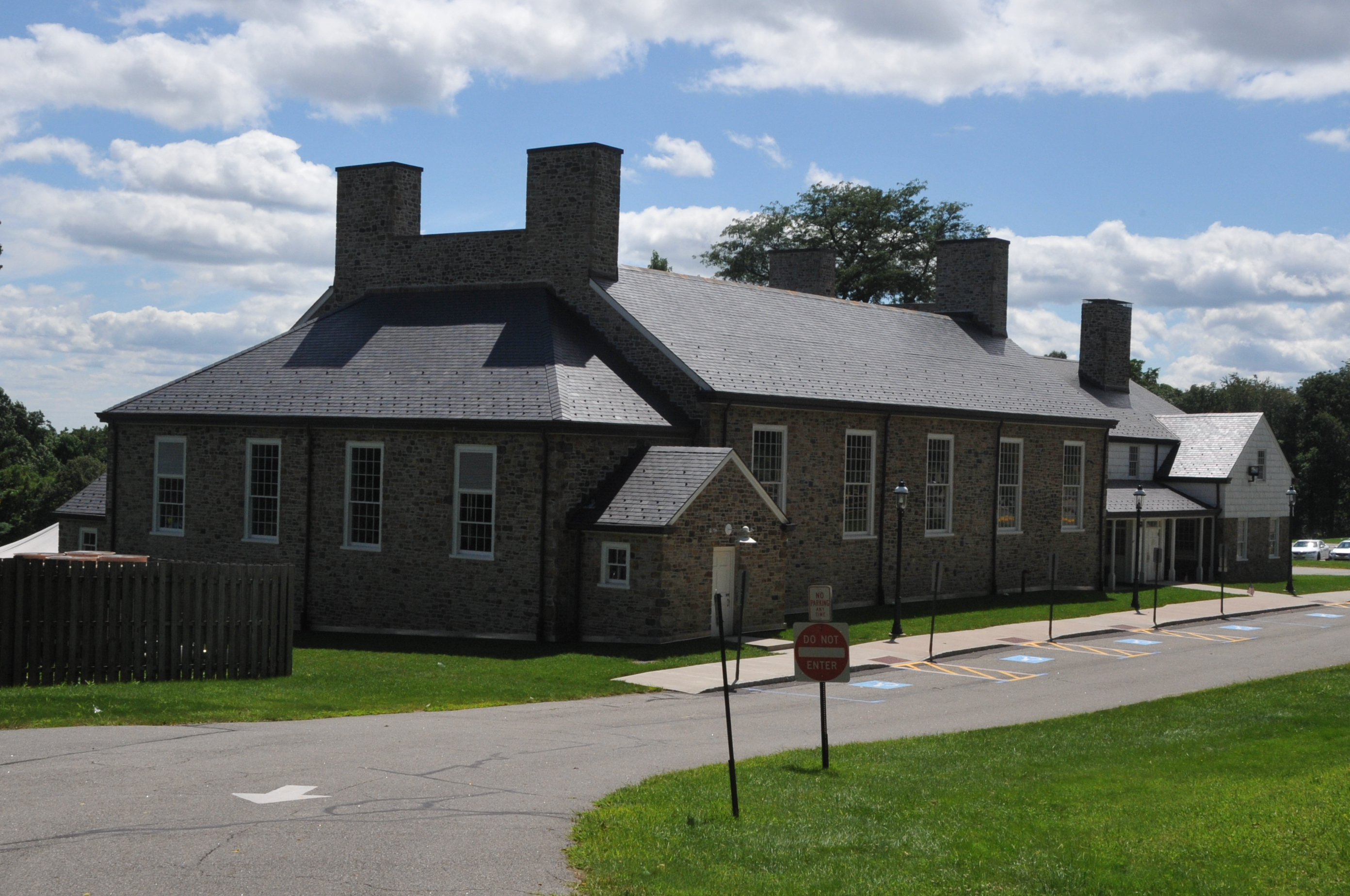

- Location within Hunterdon County, New Jersey Location within New Jersey Location within the United States
- Location: CR 519, Riegel Ridge, New Jersey
- Nearest city: Milford, New Jersey
- Coordinates: 40°36′38″N 75°6′57″W
- Area: 22 acres (8.9 ha)
- Built: 1938
- Architect: James Gamble Rogers
- Architectural style: Colonial Revival
- NRHP reference No.: 96000656
- NJRHP No.: 3243

Significant dates
- Added to NRHP: June 7, 1996
- Designated NJRHP: April 24, 1996

The Riegel Ridge Community Center is a historic building located on County Route 519 in the Riegel Ridge section of Holland Township near Milford in Hunterdon County, New Jersey, United States. It was added to the National Register of Historic Places on June 7, 1996, for its significance in architecture, entertainment and social history.

== History and description ==
The 22-acre (8.9 ha) property includes a two-story Colonial Revival community house, baseball field with grandstand, and pool house. The community house was designed by architect James Gamble Rogers. It was built from 1937 to 1938 by the Riegel Paper Corporation, led by its chairman Benjamin D. Riegel, for the benefit of its employees and their families. Since 1996, the property has been owned and operated by the township.

== See also ==
- National Register of Historic Places listings in Hunterdon County, New Jersey
