= West Mountain Historic District =

Historic district in Connecticut, United States

- U.S. National Register of Historic Places
- U.S. Historic district
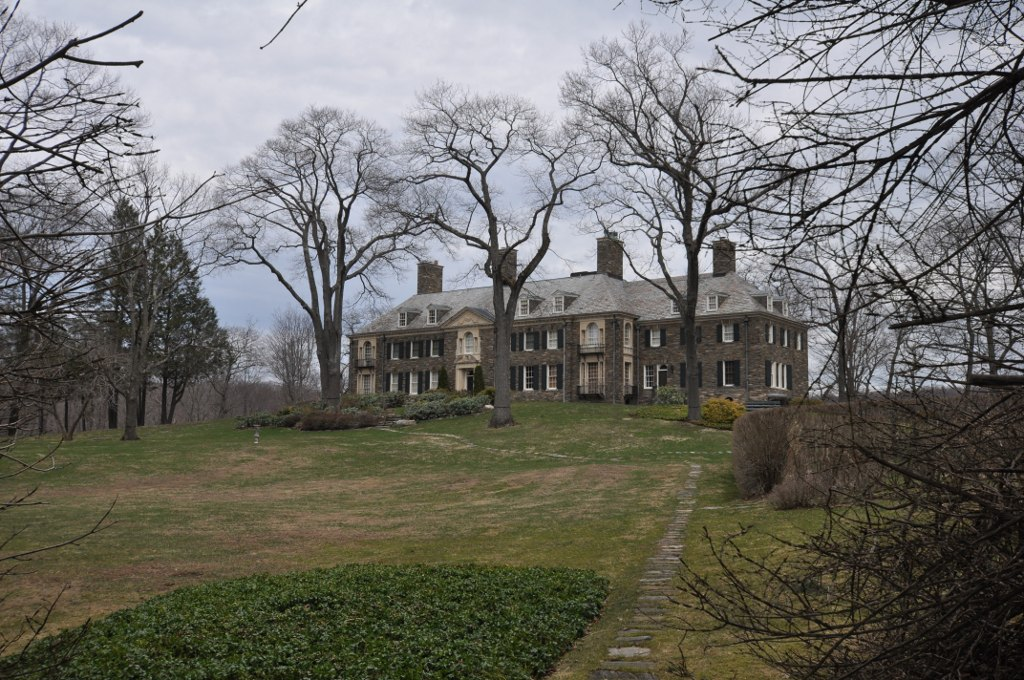
- 60 Oreneca Road

- Location within Connecticut Location within the United States
- Location: Ridgefield, Connecticut
- Coordinates: 41°17′53″N 73°31′44″W
- Area: 425 acres (172 ha)
- Architect: Rogers, James Gamble
- Architectural style: Colonial Revival, Georgian Revival
- NRHP reference No.: 84000828
- Added to NRHP: February 23, 1984

The West Mountain Historic District is a 425-acre (172 ha) historic district northwest of the center of Ridgefield, Connecticut in Fairfield County, Connecticut that was listed on the National Register of Historic Places in 1984. It includes 12 contributing buildings. It is roughly centered on the junction of West Mountain Road and Oreneca Road, between Ridgefield center and the state line. It includes five large country estates developed in the early 20th century. Its "grandest" house is "Orenica", described as "a 1932 Georgian Revival style stone structure of considerable pretension" that was home of Philip Dakin Wagoner (1876-1972), chairman of the board of the Underwood Typewriter Company.

== See also ==
- National Register of Historic Places listings in Fairfield County, Connecticut
