= Sterling Law Building =

Yale Law School building in New Haven, Connecticut

Coordinates: 41.3120°N 72.9281°W

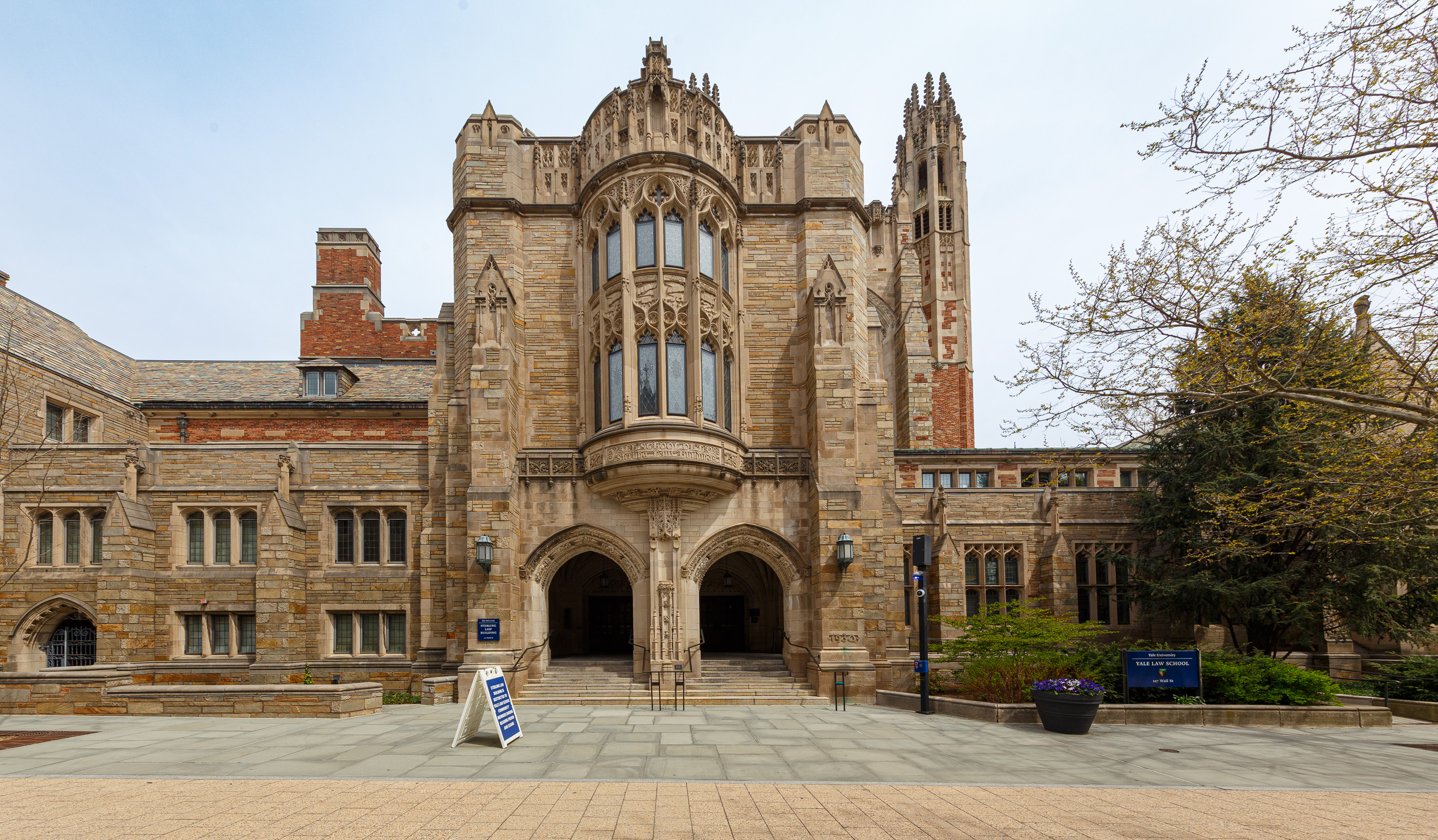
Sterling Law Building

Sterling Law Building houses the Yale Law School. It is located at 127 Wall Street, New Haven, Connecticut, close to the downtown area, in the heart of the Yale campus. It occupies one city block between the Hall of Graduate Studies, the Beinecke Library, Sterling Library, and the Grove Street Cemetery.

The Sterling Law Building was built in 1931 and was designed by James Gamble Rogers. Its model follows the English Inns of Court. In contains classrooms, offices, a law library, a dining hall, a day-care center, and a courtyard.

The building is named after Yale alumnus and benefactor John William Sterling, name partner of the New York law firm Shearman & Sterling.
