= Ted Hines =

American librarian and information scientist

Theodore Christian "Ted" Hines
- Born: September 9, 1926; Washington, DC
- Died: June 25, 1983 (aged 56)
- Occupations: librarian, information scientist

Theodore Christian "Ted" Hines (September 9, 1926 - June 25, 1983) was an American pioneer in the use of microcomputers and microcomputer programs in libraries.

Hines was born in Washington, D.C.. He served in the U.S. Army from 1944 to 1947, with assignments in Italy and Germany.

He attended undergraduate school at George Washington University. From 1947 to 1957 he worked in the District of Columbia Public Library system, rising to chief of its Extension Department. He received his Masters of Library Science (MLS) in 1958 and a PhD in 1960 both from Rutgers University.

He later became a professor of Library Science at Rutgers, followed by Columbia University, and the University of North Carolina at Greensboro.

With his wife, Lois Winkel, he designed an indexing program called the Children’s Media Databank. The program was first constructed on a mainframe computer, and then transferred to a microcomputer for patron use. This program allowed a patron to search for children's books by subject and reading level. A sample search query might be a 3rd grader with a 6th grade reading level on the subject of clouds.

Hines convened the first meeting of the American Society of Indexers (ASI, now American Society for Indexing) in 1968.

The ASI considers him its "founding father", and set up the Theodore C. Hines Award in his honor in 1993.

== Publications ==
- "The Crisis in Children's Cataloging" Library Journal (September 15, 1966)
- "Computer Filing of Index, Bibliographic, and Catalog Entries" (BroDart, 1966) written with Jessica Harris
- "Terminology of Library and Information Science: A Selective Glossary" (Columbia University School of Library Service, 1971).
- Malclès, Louise-Noëlle (1961). Bibliography. Translated by Hines, Theodore Christian. New York: Scarecrow Press. pp. xii, 152. OCLC 576750.
- Hines, Theodore C. (1975). "Shaw and the Machine". In Stevens, Norman D. (ed.). Essays for Ralph Shaw. Metuchen, N.J.: Scarecrow Press. pp. 7–14. ISBN 0-8108-0815-3.
