= Charles C. Williamson =

American librarian (1877–1965)

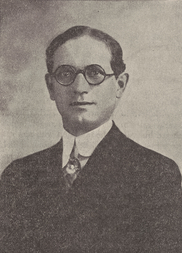
- Born: January 26, 1877; Salem
- Died: January 11, 1965 (aged 87); Greenwich Hospital (Connecticut)
- Occupation: Librarian

Charles Clarence Williamson (January 26, 1877 – January 11, 1965) was the Director of Columbia University Libraries and Dean of the Columbia University School of Library Service from 1926 to 1940. He studied economics at Western Reserve College, the University of Wisconsin, and Columbia University before joining the New York Public Library in 1911 as the head of a new Division of Economics.

Williamson held positions at Bryn Mawr College, the New York Public Library, the Carnegie Foundation, and the Rockefeller Foundation.

In 1919, he initiated a study of the training for library service in the United States for the Carnegie Foundation. Known as the "Williamson Report," the project was completed in 1921 and published in as Training for Library Service. He established a rationale for research as a component of professional service. His role in the development of education for librarians is discussed in The Shaping of American Library Education.

Williamson was honored with the Beta Phi Mu Award in 1964. In 1999, Williamson was named as one of 100 American librarians who made a lasting impact on library service and the nation.
