= Academic institution =

Institution granting academic degrees

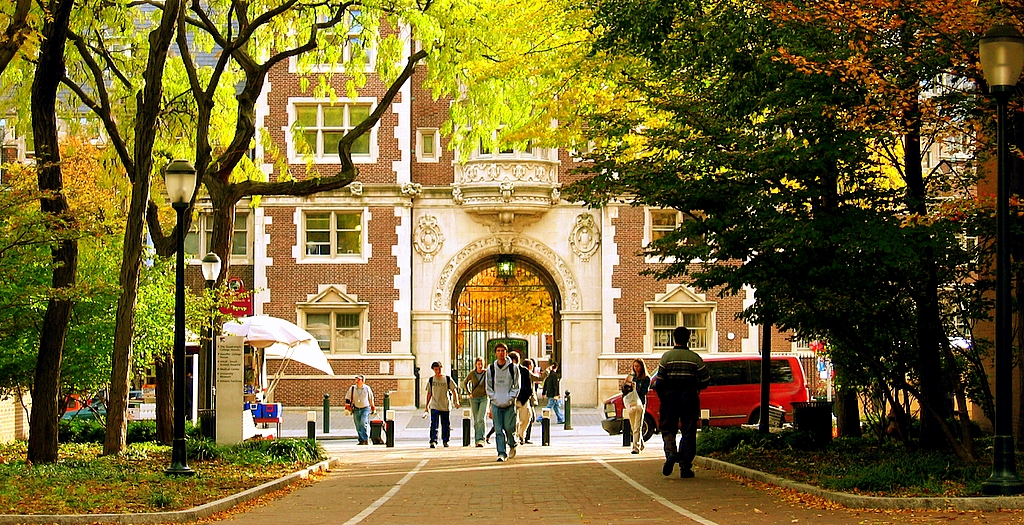
The University of Pennsylvania, an American research university

An academic institution is an educational institution dedicated to education and research, which grants academic degrees. See also academy and university.

== Types ==
- Primary schools – (from French école primaire) institutions where children receive the first stage of compulsory education known as primary or elementary education. Primary school is the preferred term in the United Kingdom and many Commonwealth Nations, and in most publications of the United Nations Educational, Scientific, and Cultural Organization (UNESCO). In some countries, and especially in North America, the term elementary school is preferred. Children generally attend primary school from around the age of four or five until the age of eleven or twelve.
- Secondary schools – institutions where the final stage of compulsory schooling, known as secondary education, takes place. It follows on from primary or elementary education. There are many different types of secondary school and the terminology used varies around the world. Children usually transfer to secondary school between the ages of 11 and 14, and finish between the ages of 16 and 18, though there is considerable variation from country to country. In North America the term high school is often used as a synonym for secondary school.
- Advanced educational institutions, also known as tertiary schools or schools of higher education – Tertiary education, also referred to as third stage, third level, and post-secondary education, is the educational level following the completion of a school providing a secondary education, such as a high school, secondary school, or gymnasium. Higher education is normally taken to include undergraduate and postgraduate education, while vocational education and training beyond secondary education is known as further education.

These types of institutions can be further categorized based on the type of education they offer and the form of funding they receive.

=== Funding types ===
- Private schools – Private schools, or independent schools, are schools not administered by local, state, or national government, which retain the right to select their student body and are funded in whole or in part by charging their students tuition rather than with public (state) funds. In the United Kingdom and some other Commonwealth countries the use of the term is generally restricted to primary and secondary educational levels: it is almost never used of universities or other tertiary institutions.
- Parochial schools – A parochial school (also known as a faith school or a sect school) is a type of school which engages in religious education in addition to conventional education. Parochial schools are typically grammar schools or high schools run by churches, diocese or parishes. Tertiary education that may not require study in a particular religious doctrine may also be in the tradition or directly supported by a religious organization, and may or may not receive primary funding from that or any other religious organization, are not usually referred to as "parochial".
- Public schools – In some countries, a public school is financed and operated by an agency of government which does not charge tuition fees; instead, financing is obtained through taxes or other government-collected revenues. This is in contrast to a private school (also known as an independent school). Here, the word "public" is used in the same sense as in "public library", that is, provided for the public at public expense. These public schools range in classes from kindergarten to four years of high school or secondary school, normally taking pupils up to the age of seventeen or eighteen.

=== Education provided ===
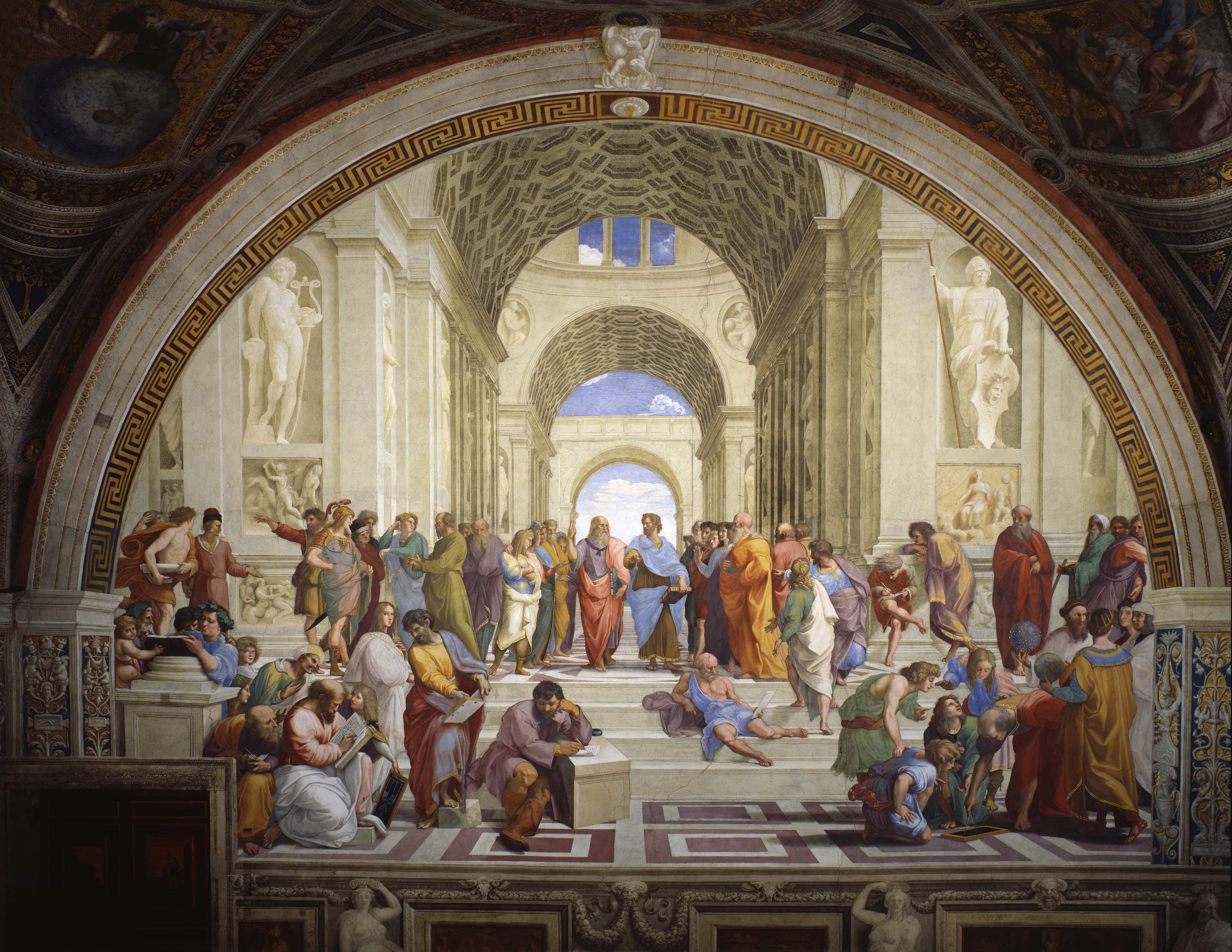
The School of Athens, an ancient Greek academy, fresco by Raphael (1509–1510)

- College – This term, from (Latin collegium) is most often used today to denote an educational institution. More broadly, it can be the name of any group of colleagues (see, for example electoral college, College of Arms, College of Cardinals). Originally, it meant a group of persons living together under a common set of rules (con- = "together" + leg- = "law" or lego = "I choose"); indeed, some colleges call their members "fellows". The precise usage of the term varies among English-speaking countries.
- University – A university is an institution of higher education and research, which grants academic degrees at all levels (bachelor, master, and doctorate) in a variety of subjects. A university provides both undergraduate education and postgraduate education. The word university is derived from the Latin universitas magistrorum et scholarium, roughly meaning "community of teachers and scholars".
- Technical schools – Technical school is a general term used for two-year college which provide mostly employment-preparation skills for trained labor, such as welding, culinary arts and office management.
- Vocational/trade schools – A vocational school, providing vocational education and also as referred to as a trade school or career college, and school is operated for the express purpose of giving its students the skills needed to perform a certain job or jobs. Traditionally, vocational schools have not existed to further education in the sense of liberal arts, but rather to teach only job-specific skills, and as such have been better considered to be institutions devoted to training, not education.

=== Professional schools ===
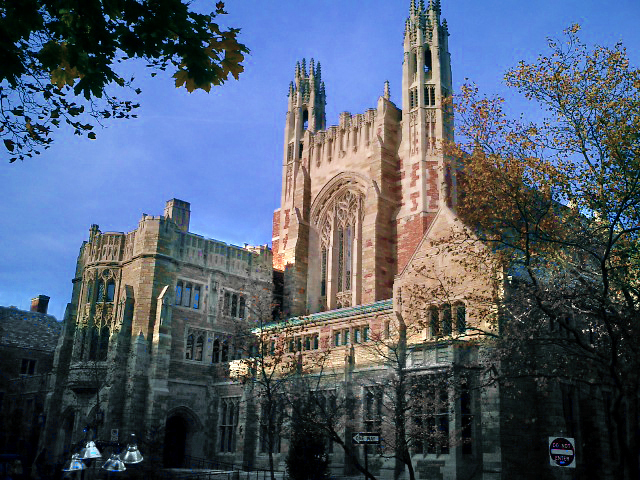
Yale Law School, an American law school housed in the Sterling Law Building (built 1931)

- Medical school – A medical school or faculty of medicine is a tertiary educational institution or part of such an institution that teaches medicine. In addition to fulfilling a major requirement to become a medical doctor, some medical schools offer master's degree programs, PhD (Doctor of Philosophy) programs, and other educational programs. Medical schools can also employ medical researchers, and operate hospitals or other programs.
- Law school – Law schools provide a legal education. Legal education is the education of individuals who intend to become legal professionals or those who simply intend to use their law degree to some end, either related to law (such as politics or academic) or business.
- Dental school
- Veterinary school – A veterinary school is a tertiary educational institution, or part of such an institution, which is involved in the education of future veterinary practitioners (veterinarians). The entry criteria, structure, teaching methodology and nature of veterinary programs offered at veterinary schools vary considerably around the world.
- Pharmacy school – The requirements of pharmacy education, pharmacist licensure and post-graduate continuing education vary from country to country and between regions/localities within countries. In most countries, prospective pharmacists study pharmacy at a pharmacy school or related institution. Upon graduation, they are licensed either nationally or by region to dispense medication of various types in the settings for which they have been trained.

== See also ==
- Academic administration
- Academic elitism
