= Rare Book and Manuscript Library (Columbia University) =

Library at Columbia University

Coordinates: 40.8064°N 73.9631°W

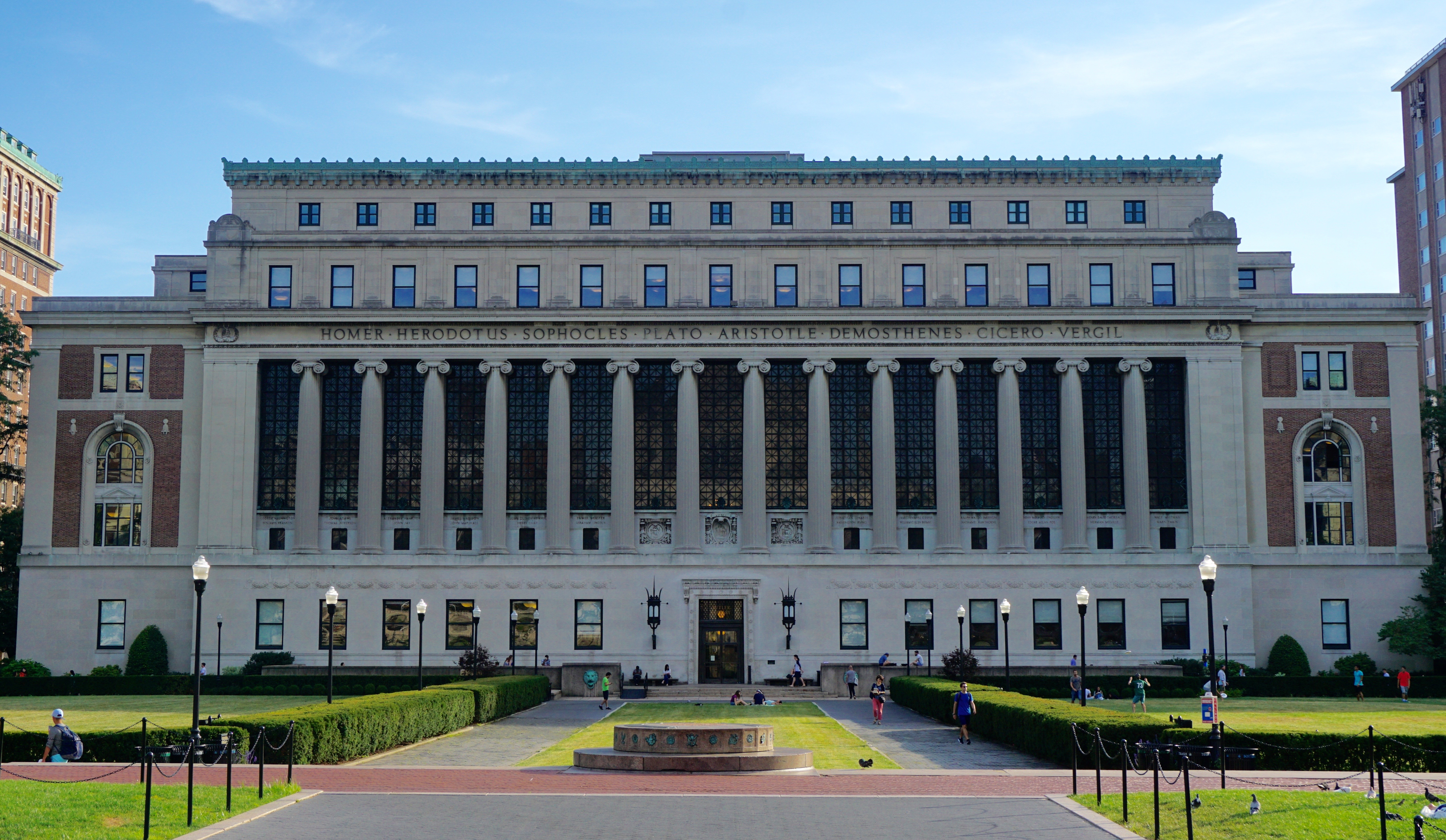
- The Rare Book and Manuscript Library is located on the sixth floor of Columbia University's Butler Library
- Location: Butler Library, New York City, New York, USA
- Type: University library
- Established: 1 July 1930
- Branch of: Columbia University Libraries

Other information
- Website: library.columbia.edu/libraries/rbml.html

The Rare Book and Manuscript Library (stylized as Rare Book & Manuscript Library) is the principal repository for the special collections of Columbia University. Located on the sixth floor of Butler Library on the university's Morningside Heights campus, its collections span more than 4,000 years, from early Mesopotamia to the present day, and span a variety of formats: cuneiform tablets, papyri, and ostraca, medieval and Renaissance manuscripts, early printed books, works of art, posters, photographs, realia (such as mathematical instruments and theater models), sound and moving image recordings, and born-digital archives. Areas of collecting emphasis include American history, Russian and East European émigré history and culture, Columbia University history, comics and cartoons, philanthropy and social reform, the history of mathematics, human rights advocacy, Hebraica and Judaica, Latino arts and activism, literature and publishing, medieval and Renaissance manuscripts, oral history, performing arts, and printing history and the book arts. It also holds the Columbia University Archives.

== History ==
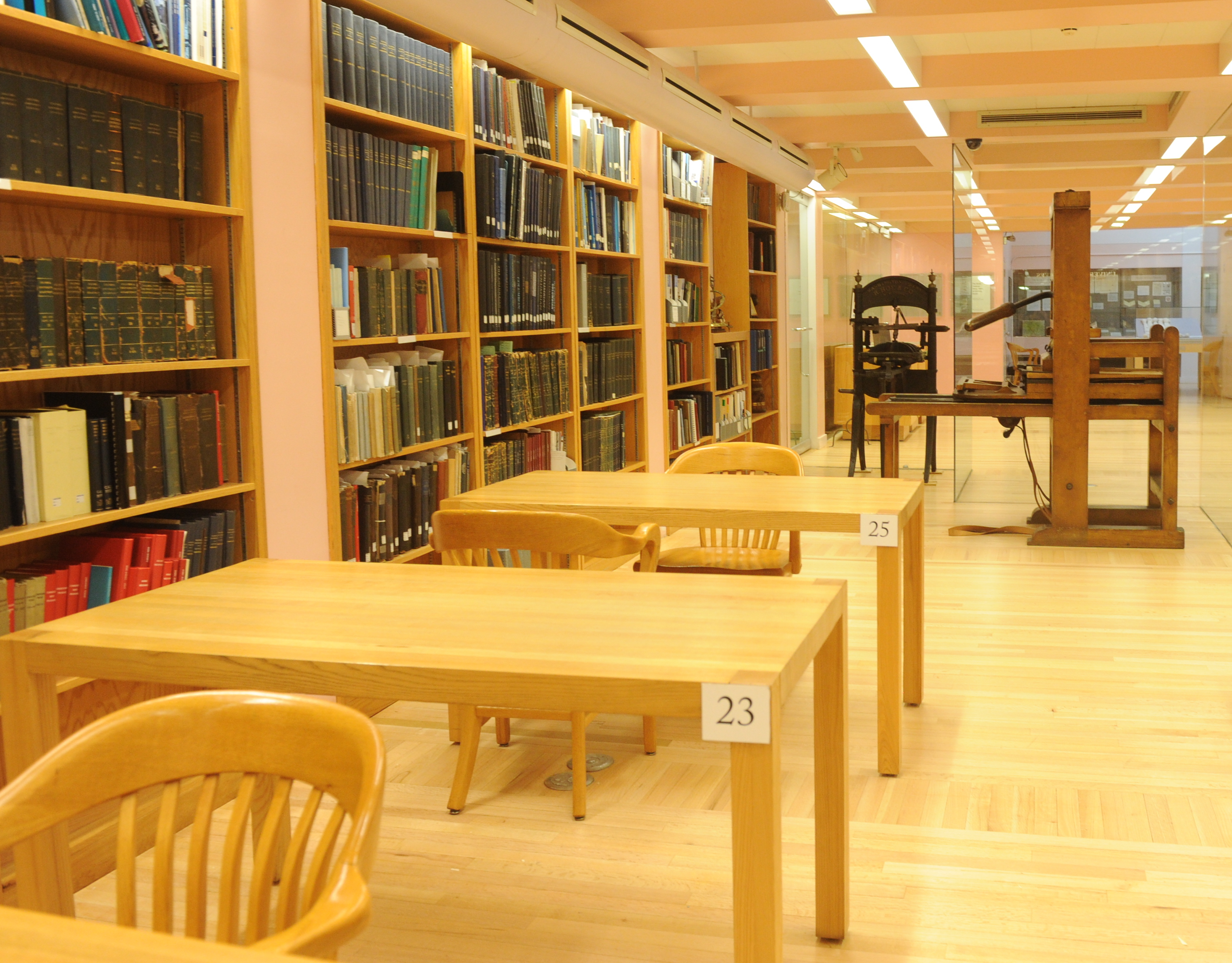
One of two RBML reading rooms

The history of the rare book and manuscript collections dates from the founding of King's College, now Columbia University, in 1754. The library holds materials related to both the first and third presidents of the University, Samuel Johnson and his son William Samuel Johnson, donated by the family in 1914. In the 19th and early 20th centuries, the University acquired significant materials though gifts from Stephen Whitney Phoenix, Richard J. H. Gottheil, Brander Matthews, Robert H. Montgomery, David Eugene Smith, and George Plimpton. These gifts included medieval and Renaissance manuscripts, materials related to the history of accountancy, education, and mathematics, and the Dramatic Museum collections. The University's first major collection purchase was Professor Edwin R. A. Seligman’s library on the history of economics in 1929. This purchase, and the creation of the Friends of the Libraries Group in the late 1920s, was the impetus for growth in the 1930s. The University moved to make provisions for the care of these types of materials, and the Trustees allowed for the establishment of the Rare Book Department on July 1, 1930. By the end of the 1930s, the library was housed on the sixth floor of Butler Library. As the library increased its collecting of archives and manuscripts, the name of the division was changed from the Rare Book Department to the Department of Special Collections in 1946. Its current name was adopted in 1975.

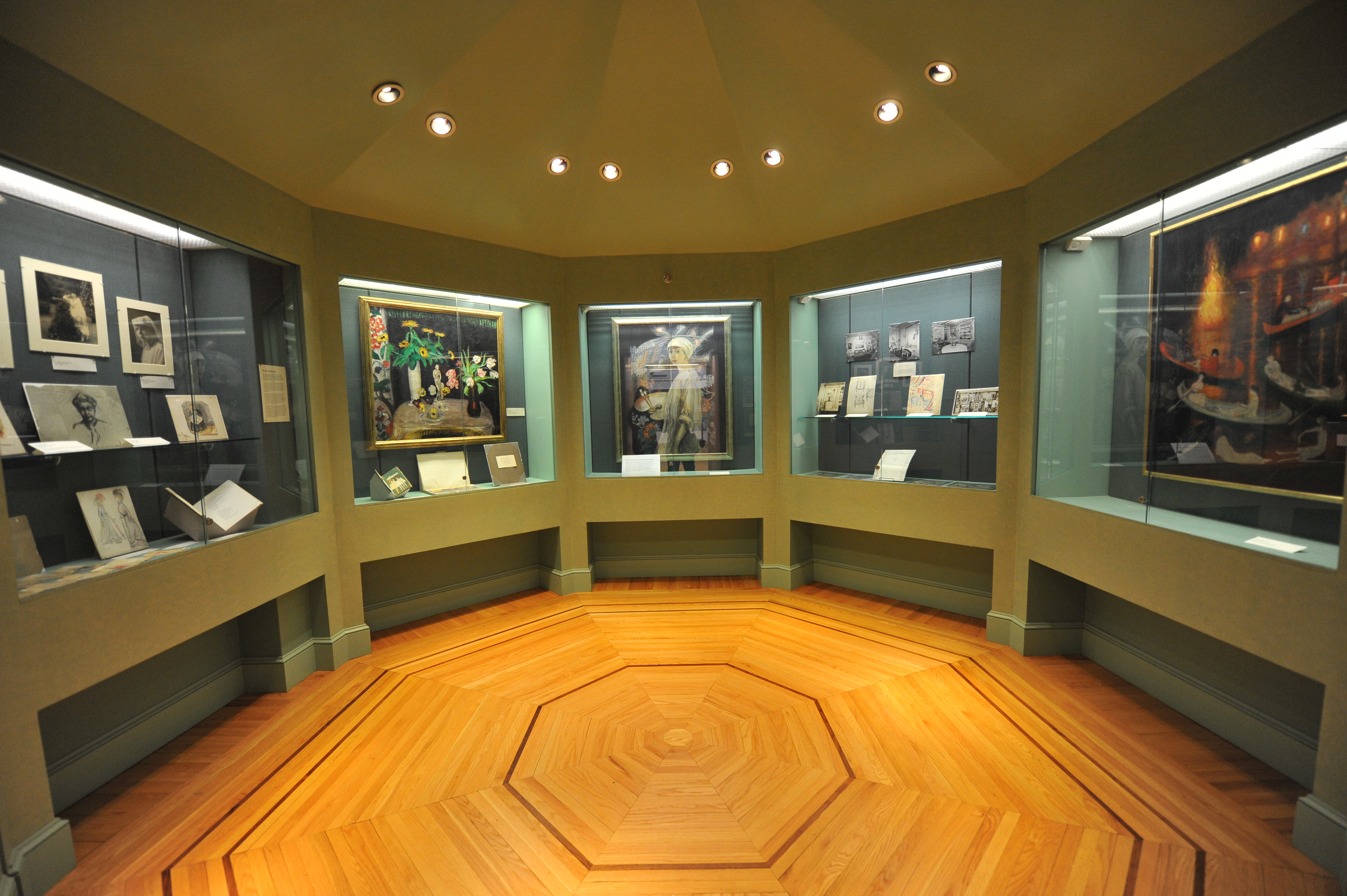
The Chang Octagon in RBML

Although many of these collections contained significant manuscripts, the collecting of manuscripts and archives in their own right took on greater importance after World War II. The library acquired several significant manuscript collections in the 1930s and 1940s, including those of editor Park Benjamin and author Stephen Crane. This work continued into the 1950s, during which time the library acquired significant collections related to American history and diplomacy, including those of John Jay. Over the years, the library has acquired archival materials in several key collecting areas—economics and banking, graphic arts, history, human rights, literature, performing arts, printing history, and publishing. In addition, the library includes a number of separately curated archival units, such as the Carnegie Philanthropy Collections, the Bakhmeteff Archive of Russian and East European Culture (named for Boris Bakhmeteff), and the Herbert H. Lehman American History Collections (named for Herbert H. Lehman).

== Holdings ==
The library's collections are particularly strong in English and American history and literature, children's literature, economics and banking, education, graphic arts, human rights, journalism history, librarianship, mathematics and astronomy, New York City politics, philanthropy, printing history, social welfare and social work, theater history, and the performing arts.

In 2025, the library acquired the archival collection of minutiae, an anonymous photography app, described by the library as among the first mobile application archives to enter an academic rare book collection.

== Units ==
The Rare Book & Manuscript Library is organized into several units:

- Administration
- Archives Processing (oversees the arrangement and description of manuscripts and archives)
- Collections Management (responsible for the intake and ongoing care of all collections regardless of format)
- Curatorial (devoted to collection development, instruction, and outreach relating to core areas including Medieval & Renaissance collections, Russian & Eastern European émigrés (the Bakhmeteff Archive), American History, Literature, Rare Books, oral history (Oral History Archives at Columbia), the performing arts, and comics and cartoons.
- Public Services (manages the reading room, online and in-person reference and duplication requests)
- University Archives (charged with preserving and providing access to Columbia University's history)

== Columbia University Archives ==
The Columbia University Archives are located within the Rare Book & Manuscript Library on the 6th floor of Butler Library; they collect, preserve, and make available for research the administrative records of Columbia University, as well as personal papers, publications, and memorabilia related to the University's history.

Archival holdings date from the 18th through the early 21st centuries and document the evolution of University governance and administration; the history and development of individual schools, colleges, and academic departments; the professionalization of higher education and the development of academic disciplines; curriculum development, including the formation of the Core Curriculum; the careers of noteworthy faculty and officers; the design and construction of the Morningside campus; and the University's relationships with city, state, and federal governments. Administrative records available for research after 25 years. In addition the UA retains University publications from bulletins to yearbooks; a library of books and pamphlets on Columbia's history; scrapbooks and memorabilia; in excess of 60,000 images, as well as some 50,000 negatives (both glass plate and film); a collection of lantern slides; and biographical information on students, faculty, and alumni.

== Sources ==
- Ashton, Jean. “An Introduction by Jean Ashton, Director of RBML.” In Jewels in Her Crown: Treasures from the Special Collections of Columbia's Libraries. USA: Columbia University in the City of New York, 2004.
- Jacob Bailey Moore, Henry Thayer Drowne, Memorial Sketches of Stephen Whitney Phoenix. Boston: Press of David Clapp & Son, 1883.
- “Columbia Gets Printing Books Type Founders Exhibit Is Now on Deposit At the Library,” Columbia Daily Spectator, Volume LX, Number 8, 5 October 1936
- Columbia University Archives website timelines.
- “Columbia is given $1.4 million fund.” The New York Times. November 18, 1973.
- Hyde, Mary C. “History of the Library friends and the Phoenix Story of Columbia.” In Library Columns. Volume XX. No. 3. 1971.
- Lohf, Kenneth A. “Collections of the Rare Book and Manuscript Library.” In The Rare Book and Manuscript Library of Columbia University: Collections and Treasures, 11–32. New York: Columbia University Libraries, 1985.
- Douglas Martin, Obituary for Kenneth A. Lohf in The New York Times. May 18, 2002.
- Bruce P. Montgomery, "Archiving human rights: A paradigm for collection development." The Journal of Academic Librarianship 22.2 (1996): 87–96. https://doi.org/10.1016/S0099-1333(96)90174-3
- Oral History Interview with Rare Book Librarian Jane Siegel. 2016.
- Somerville, Robert. “Some Remarks on the Early History of Columbia University’s Collections of Medieval and Renaissance Manuscripts.” In Rare Book and Manuscript Occasional Publication 1: Medieval and Renaissance Manuscripts at Columbia University, edited by Beatrice Terrien-Somerville, page 1, 6. New York City: Columbia University Libraries, 1991.
