= Berkeley College, Yale University =

Residential college at Yale University

Berkeley College
- Residential college at Yale University
- Yale University
- Coat of arms of Berkeley College
- Location: 205 Elm Street
- Coordinates: 41.3106°N 72.9279°W
- Nickname: Berkeleyites
- Motto: Esse est percipi (Latin)
- Motto in English: To be is to be perceived
- Established: 1934
- Named for: Bishop George Berkeley
- Colors: Red, white
- Sister college: Dunster House at Harvard University
- Head: Jaehong Kim
- Dean: Ksenia Sidorenko
- Undergraduates: 450 (2013–2014)
- Mascot: Thundercoq
- Website: www.yale.edu/berkeley

Berkeley College is a residential college at Yale University, opened in 1934. The eighth of Yale's 14 residential colleges, it was named in honor of Bishop George Berkeley (1685–1753), dean of Derry and later bishop of Cloyne, in recognition of the assistance in land and books that he gave to Yale in the 18th century. Built on the site of a group of buildings known from the 1890s until 1933 as the Berkeley Oval, the college was renovated in 1998. It is distinct for having two courtyards connected by an underground tunnel.

== College life ==
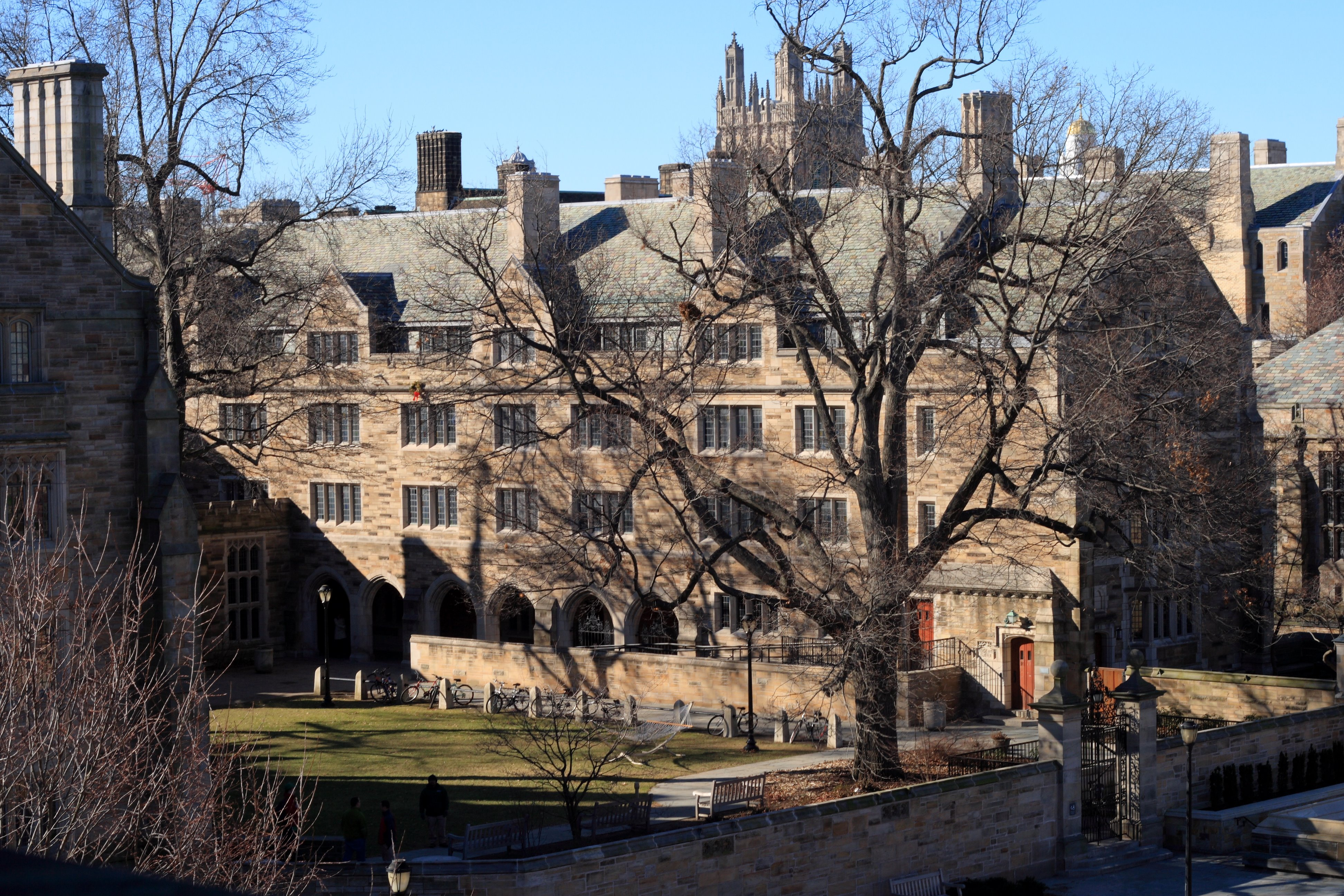
The southern portion of Berkeley College

- Berkeley freshmen are housed in Lanman-Wright Hall, renovated in 2014.
- Dining Hall: The dining hall is named in honor of Joseph Fogg.
- Buttery: Currently known as The Coq Pit. Known in the 2000s, 2010s, and early 2020s as Marvin's; known in the 1980s and 1990s as the "Bagel Bar."
- Library: Also known as "Laz," study space named in honor of George Lazarus and Shelly Lazarus.
- South Court Basement.
- Multipurpose Room: A half-court space to play basketball, it is also frequently used for practicing yoga or student orchestra rehearsals. It can be reserved through the Head's Office.
- North Court Basement: Home to The Thomas Mendenhall Common Room and the Samuel Hemingway Music Room.
- The Swiss Room: A private dining room in the dining hall. Transplanted piece by piece from Switzerland, this 16th-century wooden room has been decorated with stained glass by G. Owen Bonawit and is considered priceless. Access is restricted to fellows and Berkeley events.
- The tunnel: An underground passageway connecting Berkeley's two grand courts, North Court and South Court, which are divided by a grassy area in front of Yale's main library, Sterling Memorial Library. It stands steps away from the Beinecke Library, the Bass Library, the Commons, and the Old Campus. The tunnel features a variety of student murals on the walls.
- On the wall outside the Head's House that faces Sterling Memorial Library, there is a plaque stating that its location marks the house where Josiah Willard Gibbs lived.
- The Head's House was named as the Swensen House in 2013 to honor Berkeley Fellow David Swensen's enormous contributions to Yale as the Chief Investment Officer.
- Similar to other residential colleges, Berkeley has its own gym, seminar rooms, and other amenities.

== Traditions ==
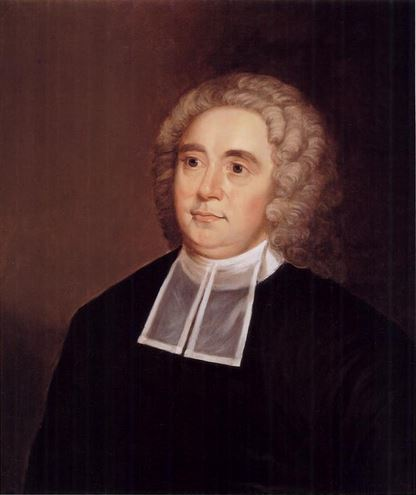
Reverend George Berkeley by Alfred C. Hart

Annual traditions include the Berkeley Birthday Dinner for fellows and seniors, Thunder Brunch, Lunar New Year's Feast, a snowball fight (which pits North Court against South Court), GLO (a blacklight party), and the Bishop Bash, which was founded in the spring of 2002 by Ben Reiter and Charles Finch under the guidance of the Head's Office.

== Dining hall ==
According to The Wall Street Journal, Yale’s Berkeley College has one of the best college dining halls in the country. It is the testing ground for an experimental organic food and sustainable produce and new menu items before they go on menus in the other dining halls. Up until 2009 it had a dining plan overseen by celebrity chef Alice Waters.

== Notable alumni ==
- Jordana Brewster, 2003, actress
- Steve Charnovitz, 1975 & 1998, law professor
- Dick Cheney, 1963, Vice President of the United States (attended, did not graduate)
- David Evans, 1992, Head of Berkeley College, professor of Geology and Geophysics
- Stephen Fishbach, 2001, Runner-up, Survivor: Tocantins
- Nancy Gibbs, 1982, writer
- Abha Khanna, attorney known for redistricting law and voting rights
- Rakesh Mohan, 1971, economist, executive director of the International Monetary Fund
- Potter Stewart, 1937, U.S. Supreme Court justice
- Fareed Zakaria, 1986, editor of Newsweek International

== Trivia ==
- On the television show Gilmore Girls, Logan Huntzberger is a member of Berkeley College.
