= Berkeley College (disambiguation) =

Berkeley College or Berklee College may refer to:

- Berkeley City College, a public community college in Berkeley, California
- Berkeley College, a private for-profit college in New York and New Jersey
- Berkeley College, Yale University, a residential college at Yale University in New Haven, Connecticut
- Berklee College of Music, a private music college in Boston, Massachusetts

== See also ==
- University of California, Berkeley, a public university in Berkeley, California
