= G. Owen Bonawit =

G. Owen Bonawit (1891–1971) was an artist whose studio created thousands of pieces of stained glass for Yale, Duke, Northwestern, and Southeast Missouri State universities; Connecticut College; Bethesda By The Sea Episcopal Church in Palm Beach, Florida and at private homes. There are, by one count, 887 pieces in Yale's Sterling Memorial Library. Bonawit worked often and closely with the architect James Gamble Rogers. His career peaked around 1930; his last major commission was in 1940.

== Works ==
- Duke University Chapel
- Deering Library (Northwestern University)
- Connecticut College, New London
- Kent Library (Southeast Missouri State University)

=== Yale University ===
- Branford College
- Saybrook College
- Sterling Memorial Library
- Berkeley College
- Hall of Graduate Studies

== Gallery ==
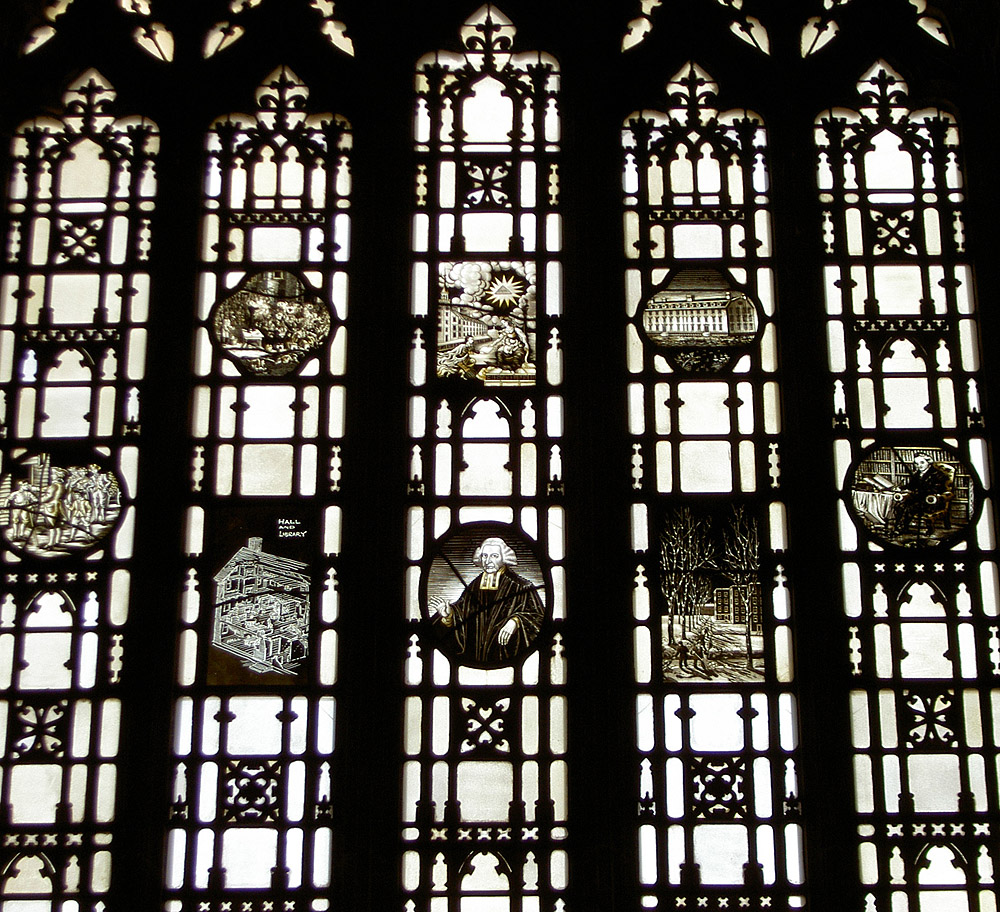
Stained glass panels

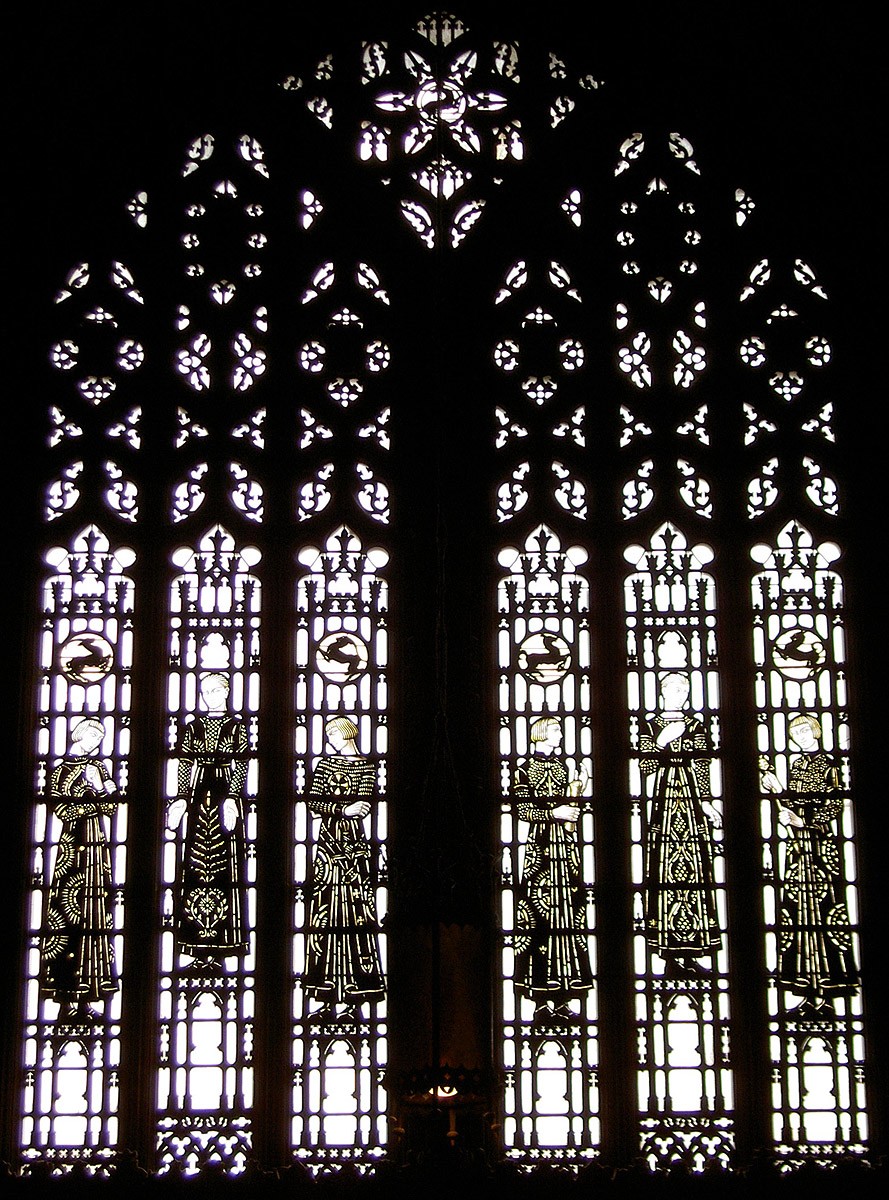
Stained glass panels

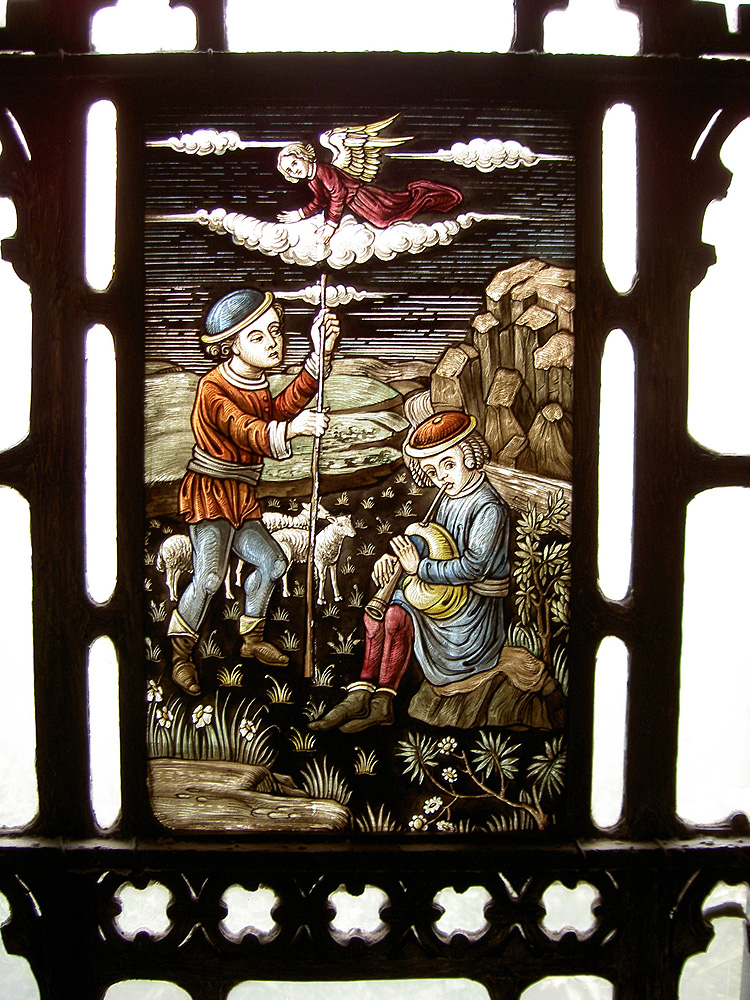
Painted" glass

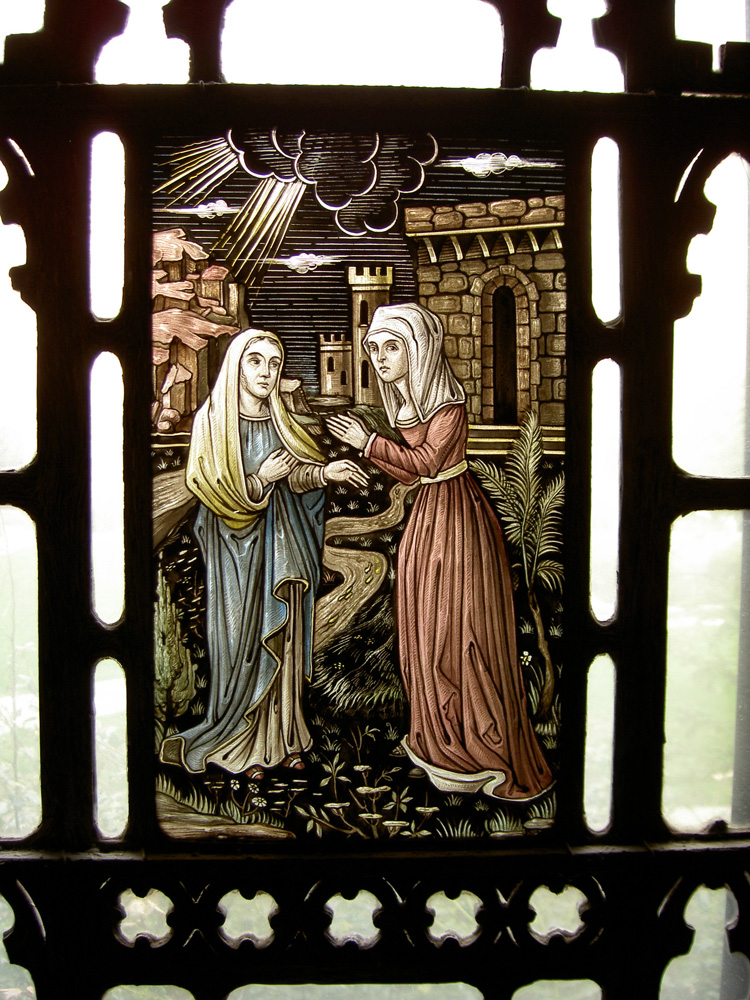
Stained glass

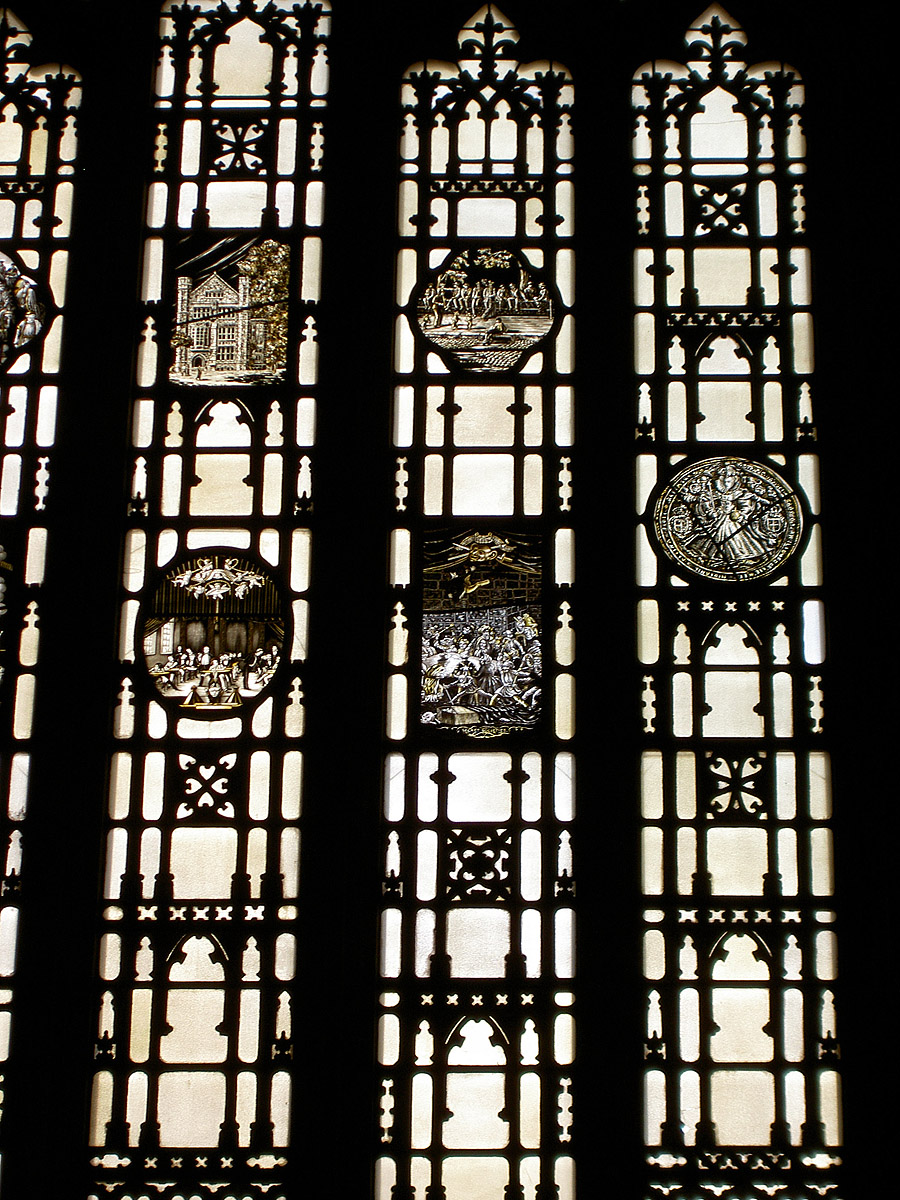
Stained glass

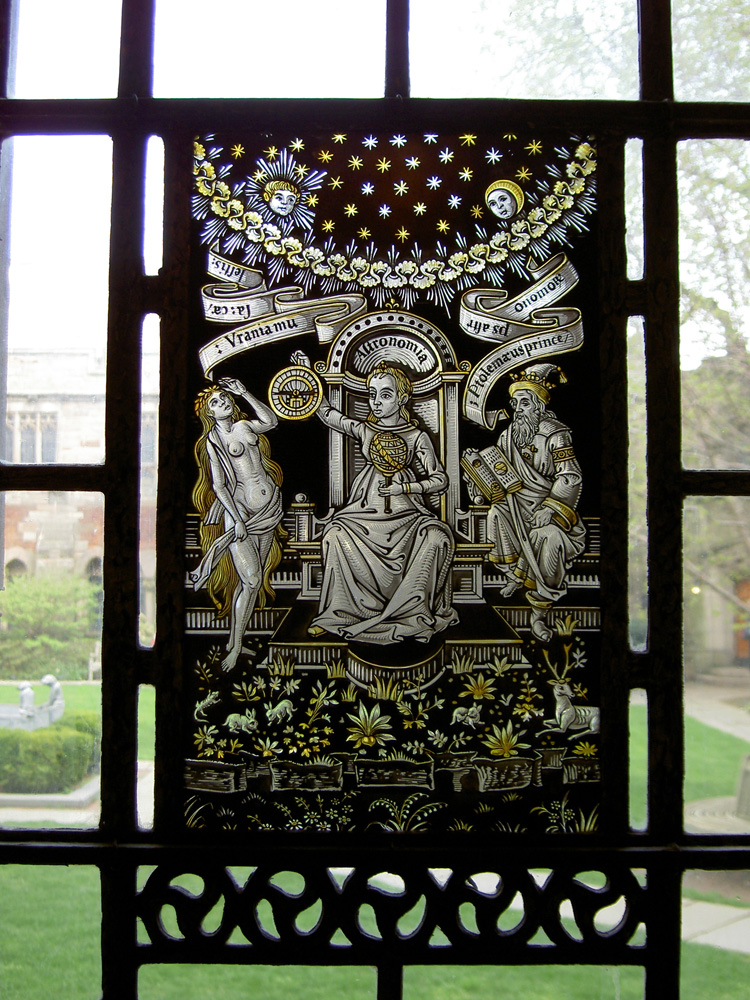
Stained glass

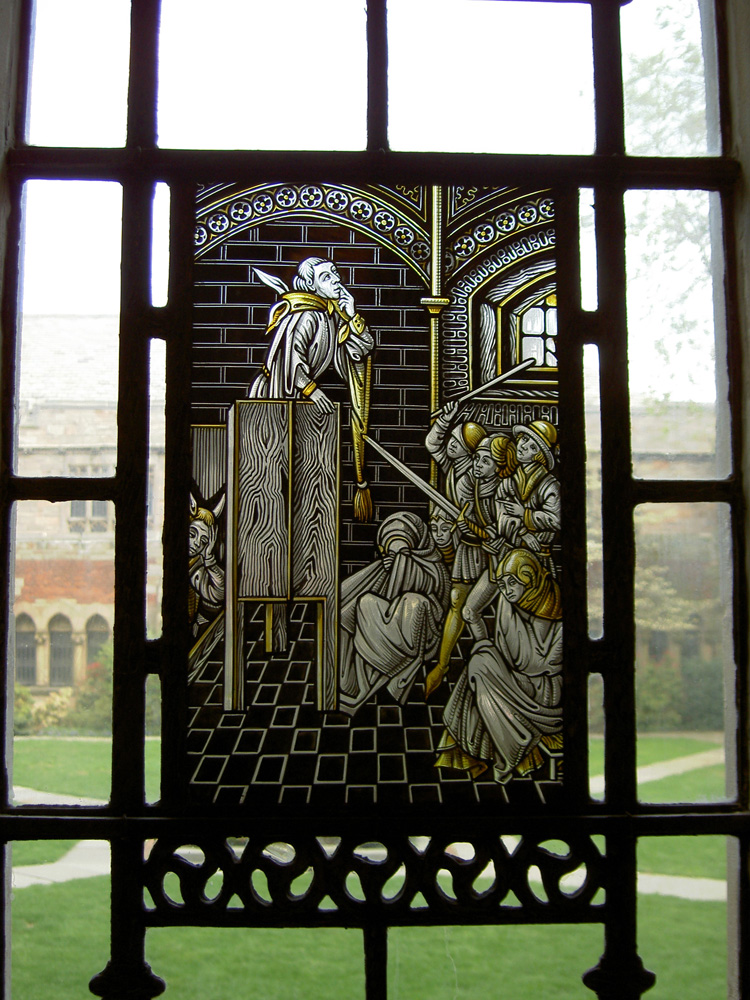
Stained glass

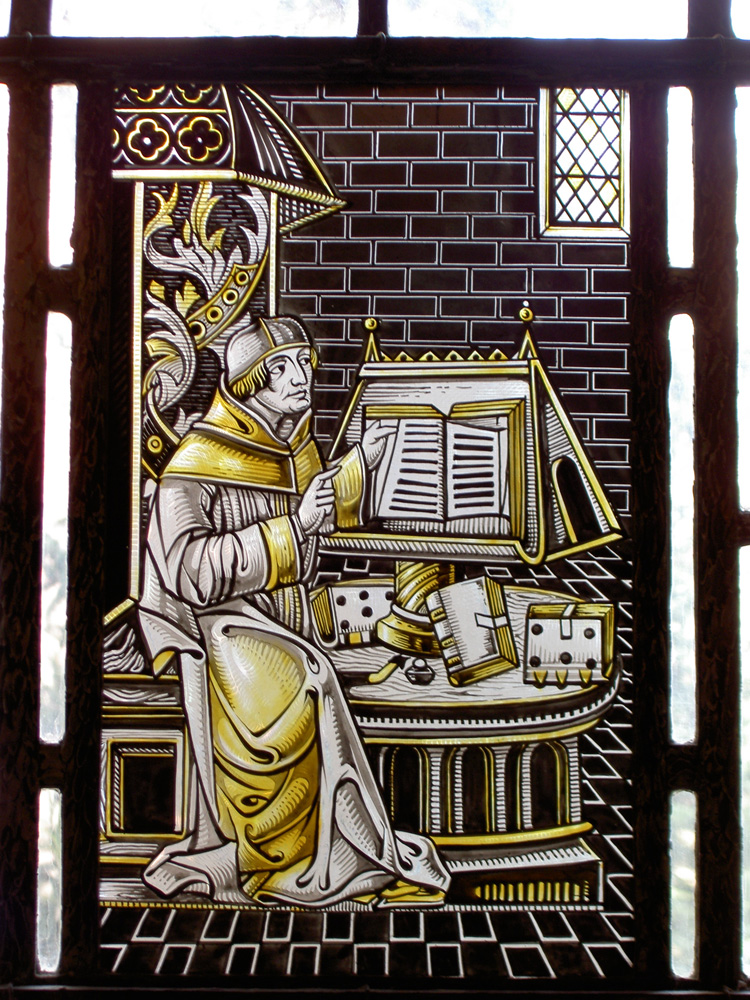
Stained glass

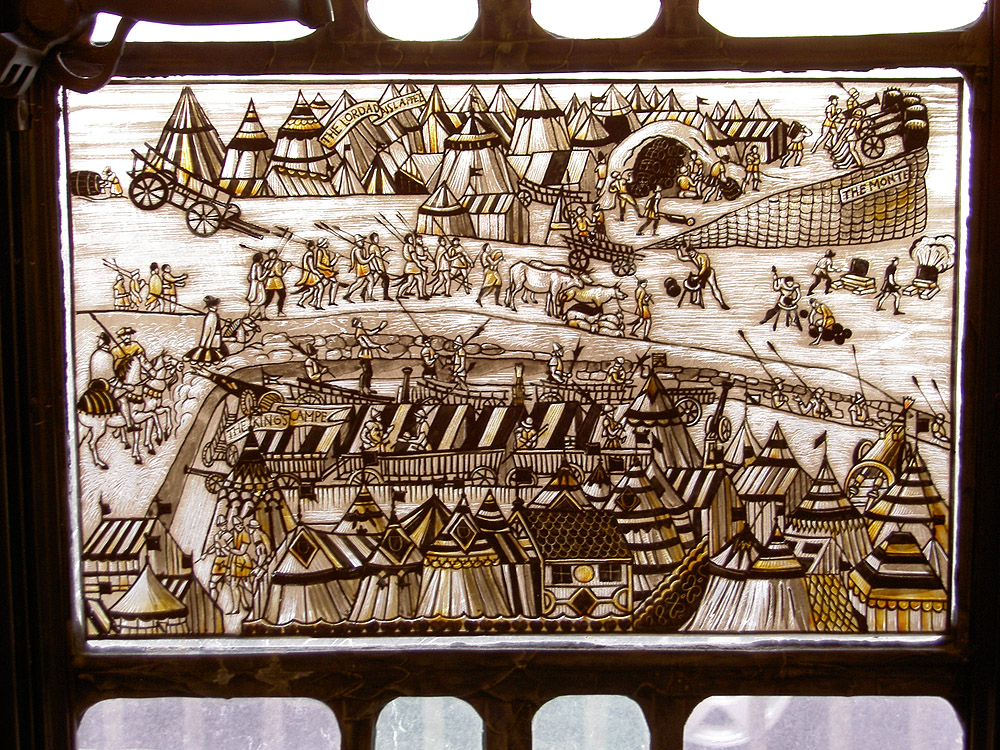
Stained glass

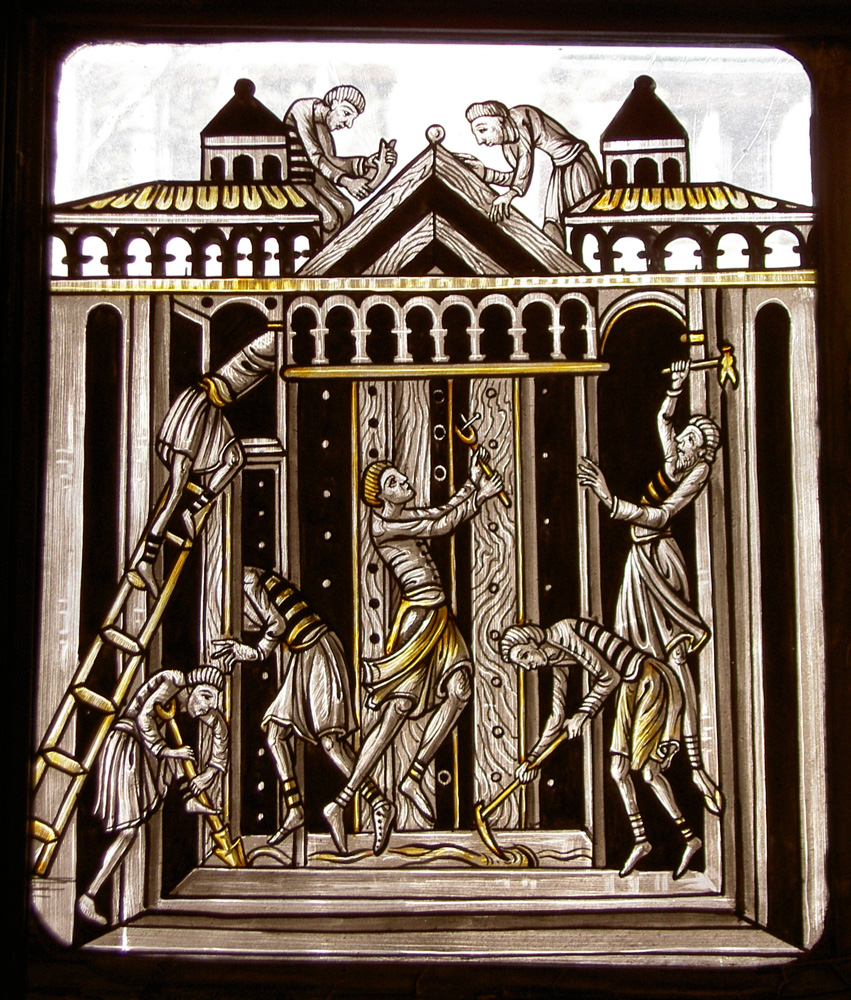
Stained glass

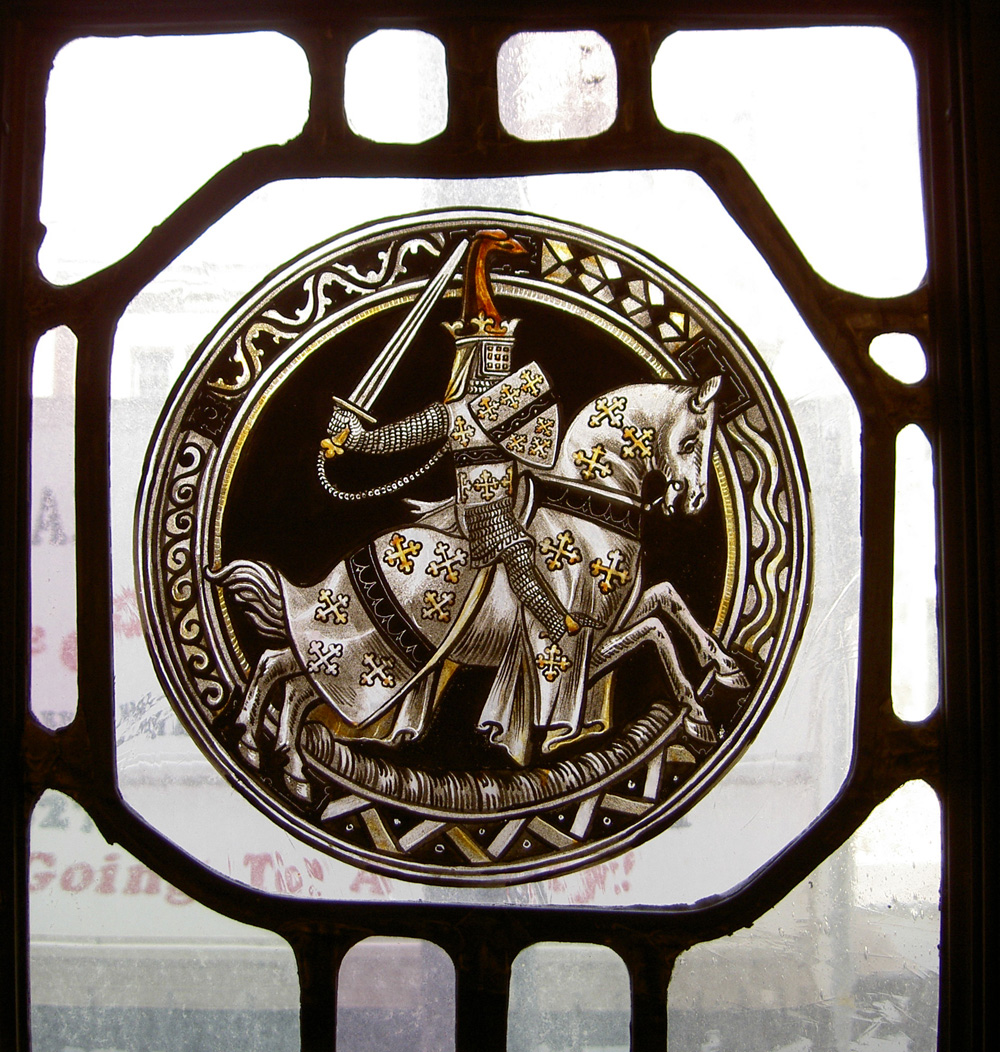
Stained glass

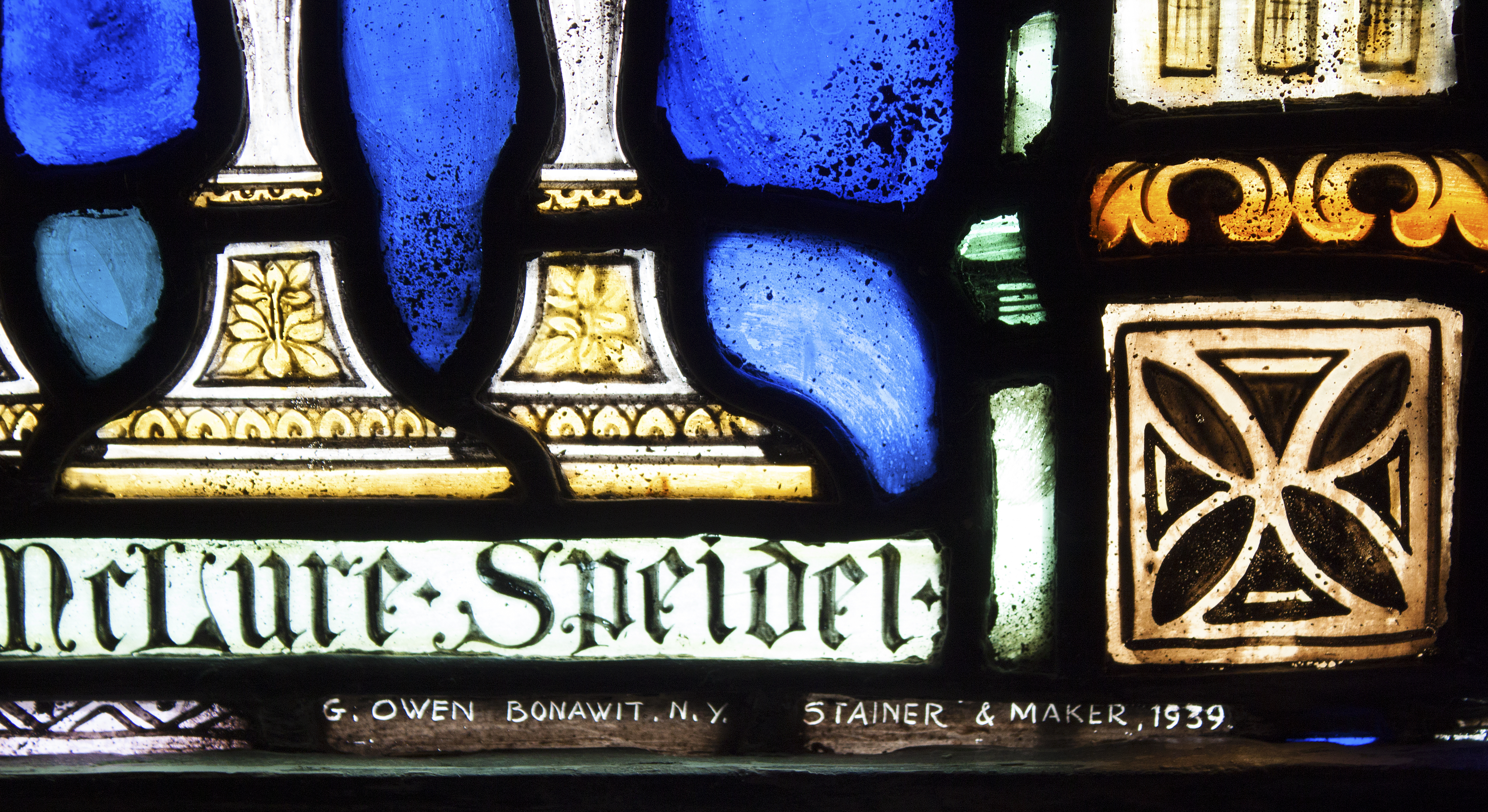
G. Owen Bonawit's maker's mark on a stained glass window in the Bethesda By The Sea Episcopal Church in Palm Beach, Florida. Image was taken 10 Dec 2010.

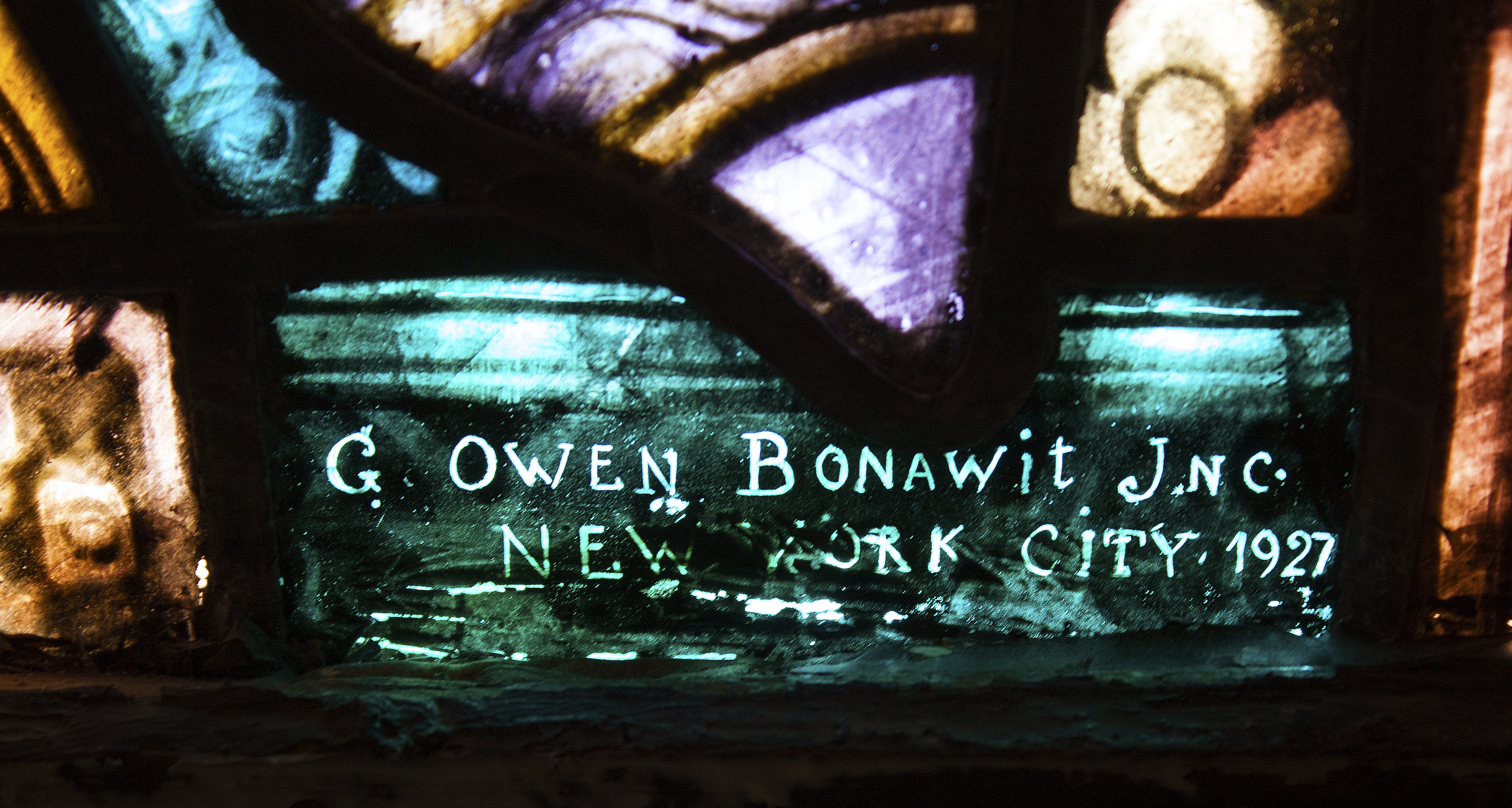
Close up shot of G. Owen Bonawit's signature on a stained glass window in the Bethseda By The Sea Episcopal Church in Palm Beach, Florida. The image includes the words "G. Owen Bonawit, Inc. New York City 1927". Other windows in the church are dated as late as 1939. Image was taken 10 Dec 2010.
