= Sterling Memorial Library =

Main library building of the Yale University Library

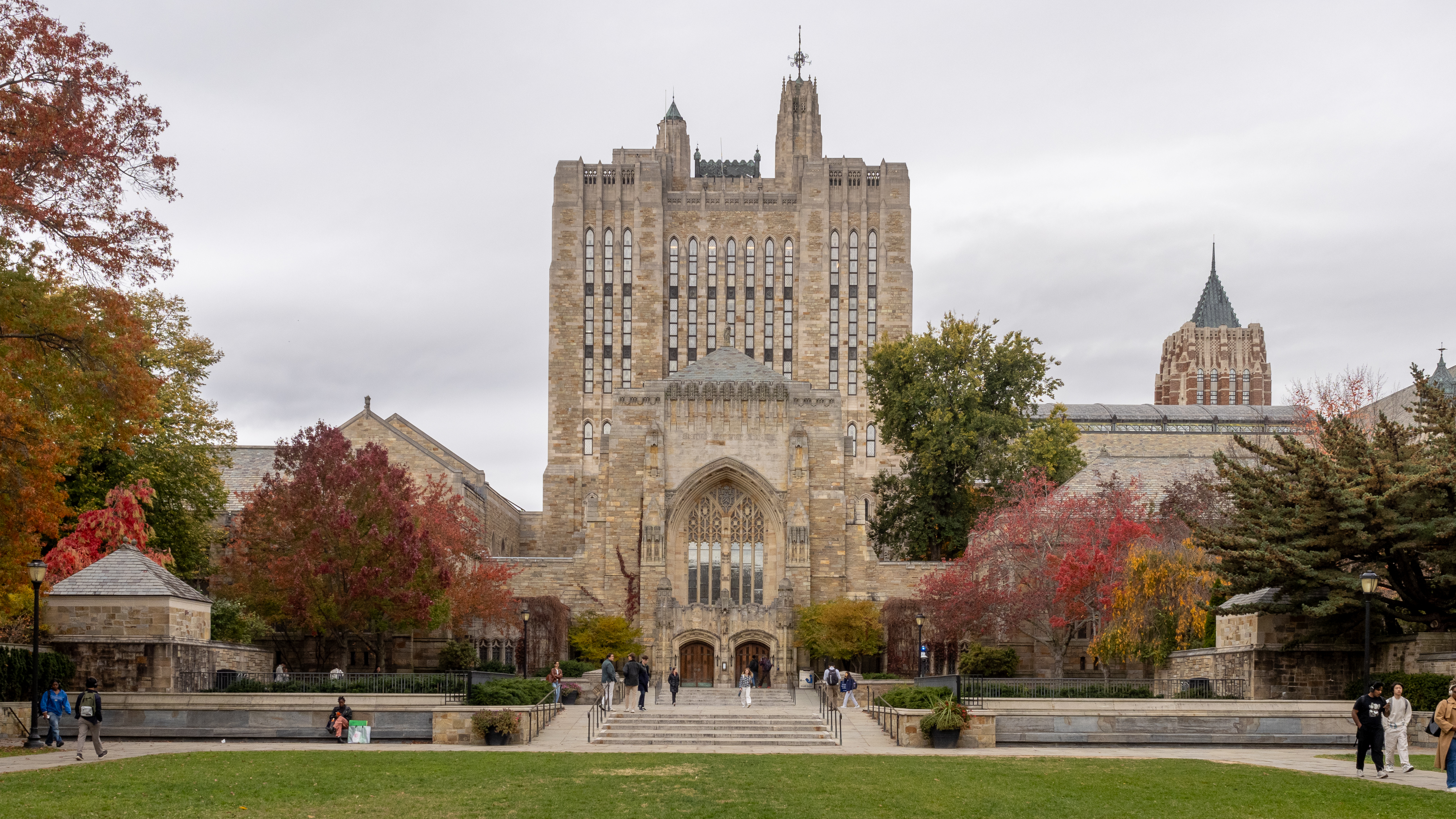
- Facade and tower of Sterling Memorial Library

- Location within Connecticut

General information
- Type: Library
- Architectural style: Collegiate Gothic
- Location: 120 High Street, New Haven, Connecticut, United States
- Coordinates: 41.3113°N 72.9291°W
- Completed: 1930
- Opened: April 1931
- Cost: $8 million
- Owner: Yale University

Height
- Height: 150 feet (46 m)

Technical details
- Floor count: 16
- Floor area: 441,651 square feet (41,030.7 m^{2})

Design and construction
- Architect: James Gamble Rogers

Website
- web.library.yale.edu/building/sterling-library

Sterling Memorial Library (SML) is the main library building of the Yale University Library system in New Haven, Connecticut, United States. Opened in 1931, the library was designed by James Gamble Rogers as the centerpiece of Yale's Gothic Revival campus. The library's tower has sixteen levels of bookstacks containing over 4 million volumes. Several special collections—including the university's Manuscripts & Archives—are also housed in the building. It connects via tunnel to the underground Bass Library, which holds an additional 150,000 volumes.

The library is named for John W. Sterling, a lawyer representing Standard Oil, whose record bequest to Yale required that an "enduring, useful and architecturally beautiful edifice" be built. Sterling Library is elaborately ornamented, featuring extensive sculpture and painting as well as hundreds of panes of stained glass created by G. Owen Bonawit. In addition to the book tower, Rogers' design featured five large reading rooms and two courtyards, one of which is now a music library.

While the library's nave and main reading rooms can be visited on guided tours, its collections are restricted to cardholders.

== History ==
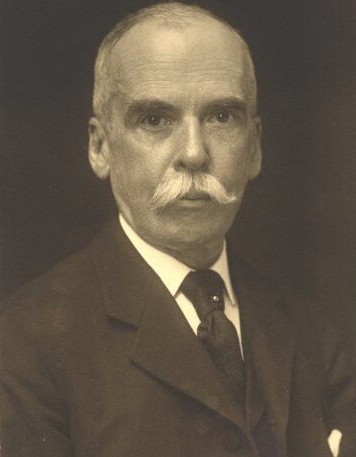
John W. Sterling, the library's namesake

For the ninety years prior to the construction of Sterling Memorial Library, Yale's library collections had been held in the College Library, a chapel-like Gothic Revival building on Yale's Old Campus now known as Dwight Hall. Built to house a collection of 40,000 books in the 1840s, and later expanded to Linsly Hall and Chittenden Hall, the old library could not hold Yale's swelling book collection, which had grown to over one million volumes.

In 1918, Yale received an $18 million bequest (equivalent to $385,287,611 in 2025) from John W. Sterling, founder of the New York law firm Shearman & Sterling, on the condition that Yale construct "at least one enduring, useful and architecturally beautiful edifice." Then the largest bequest in the history of any American university, it initiated a major period of construction on Yale's campus. Because of the library collection's growth, the university decided to make the centerpiece of Sterling's gift a new library with a capacity for 3.5 million volumes.

The building's original architect, Bertram Goodhue, intended the library to resemble his State Capitol Building in Lincoln, Nebraska, with the library's books in a prominent tower. When Goodhue died in 1924, the project passed to James Gamble Rogers, the university's consulting architect. Rogers' work on a "General Plan" for the Yale campus allowed him to incorporate the main library project into his neo-Gothic scheme for Yale's expansion.

Roger's campus plan called for the library to sit on a new main courtyard, now called Cross Campus. Originally, he planned to balance the courtyard with a 5,000-seat chapel facing opposite the library. With the end of compulsory undergraduate chapel services in 1926 and the lack of a financier, the chapel was never built. Expanding on Goodhue's tower concept, Rogers proposed the library take the form of a cathedral, which, in his own words, would be "as near to modern Gothic as we dared to make it." He modeled the library's entrance hall to resemble a vaulted nave and commissioned extensive stained glass and stone ornament to decorate the building's exterior and interior.

The library's 122,500-square-foot (11,380 m^{2}) footprint would take up more than half a city block. Twenty buildings were cleared for its construction, many of them private homes. Although excavation began in the fall of 1927, the construction site was not fully secured until July 1928, when the final holdout homeowner agreed to sell.

While the new library was planned and constructed, Yale began soliciting gifts from its alumni for the new library. By 1931, the collection had grown to nearly 2 million volumes, many of them rare books and manuscripts. Among the most important of these acquisitions was a Gutenberg Bible donated by Anna Harkness. The bible became the centerpiece of the new library's Rare Book Room, which allowed students and researchers to browse the most valuable books in the university's collection for the first time. These collections would later become the adjoining Beinecke Rare Book & Manuscript Library.

=== Critical reception ===
Like much of Yale's Gothic revival construction of the same era, the new library was criticized as expensive and retrograde. William Harlan Hale, writing in The Nation, scorned it as a "cathedral orgy," criticized the library's bastardized cathedral aesthetics and the university's timid anti-modernism. Many students of architecture leveled similar criticisms. Others asserted that the project was either sanctimonious or sacrilegious for merging academic purpose and religious architecture.

Later critics have praised the building's ambition, beauty, and pragmatism.

== Building ==
The library is situated on Yale's Cross Campus, the central quadrangle of the university. Surrounding buildings, including Berkeley College, Trumbull College, and Sterling Law Building were designed by Rogers and built in the same period and Gothic Revival style as the library.

=== Nave ===
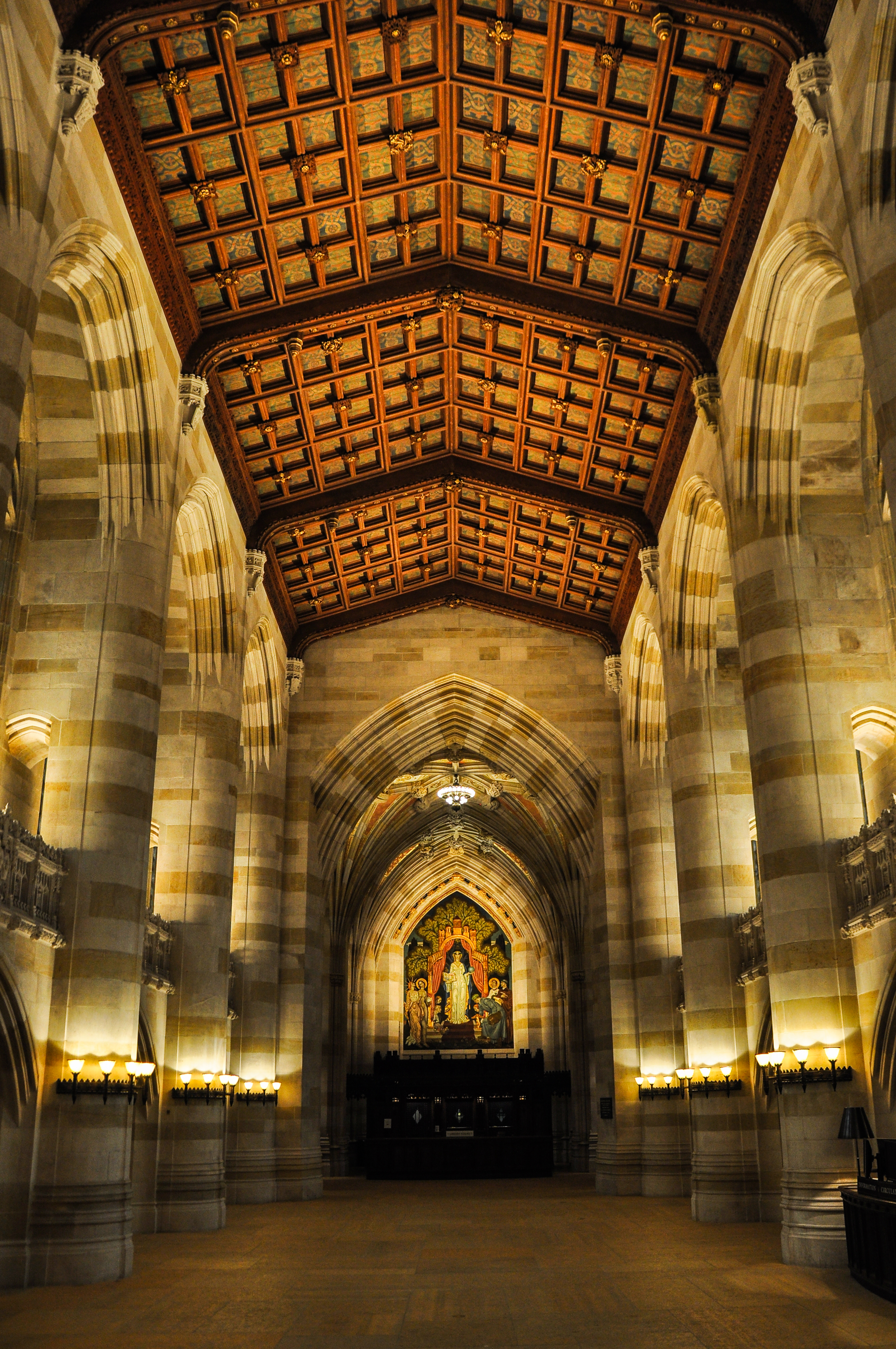
The nave, looking towards the circulation desk

The entrance hall of the library is known as the "nave" because it imitates the main approach of a cathedral. At its western terminus is a chancel containing an ornate circulation desk and altarpiece mural painted by Eugene Savage. Constructed of Indiana limestone and Ohio sandstone blocks, the nave is a self-supporting stone structure with none of the steel reinforcement used elsewhere in the library. It is elaborately decorated with stone and wood carving, ironwork, stained glass windows, and ceiling bosses. The main hall is flanked by two aisles, which originally held card catalogs for the library bookstacks. Though the original catalog drawers remain in the aisles, the cards have been removed and the aisles converted to seating areas and a computer lab. At its western end it is intersected by a transept, which leads to the library's main reading room on one end and its wing on the other. For many years, smoking was allowed in the nave, which left a layer of soot on its upper levels. Beginning in 2013, the nave underwent a $20-million, yearlong renovation to clean its surfaces, restore its architectural details, overhaul building systems, and reconfigure visitor circulation and services.

=== Tower ===
Fifteen levels of library materials, primarily books, are housed in the building's tower, commonly referred to as the "Stacks". Originally intended to house 3.5 million volumes, it is a seven-story structure, with eight mezzanine levels interleaved between the main stories. Although encased in a Gothic exterior, the tower's structural system is a welded steel frame, which permits a vertical rise that traditional Gothic techniques would not. The crenelated roof of the tower is elaborately decorated, complete with a castle-like housing for air handling equipment.

The tower's shelves are estimated to stretch 80 miles (130 km), contained within 6.5 miles (10.5 km) of aisles. In addition to the library collections, the tower houses reading rooms, study carrels, library offices, and special collections, including the Babylonian Collection. Access to the Stacks is restricted to affiliates of the university and library patrons.

=== Reading rooms ===
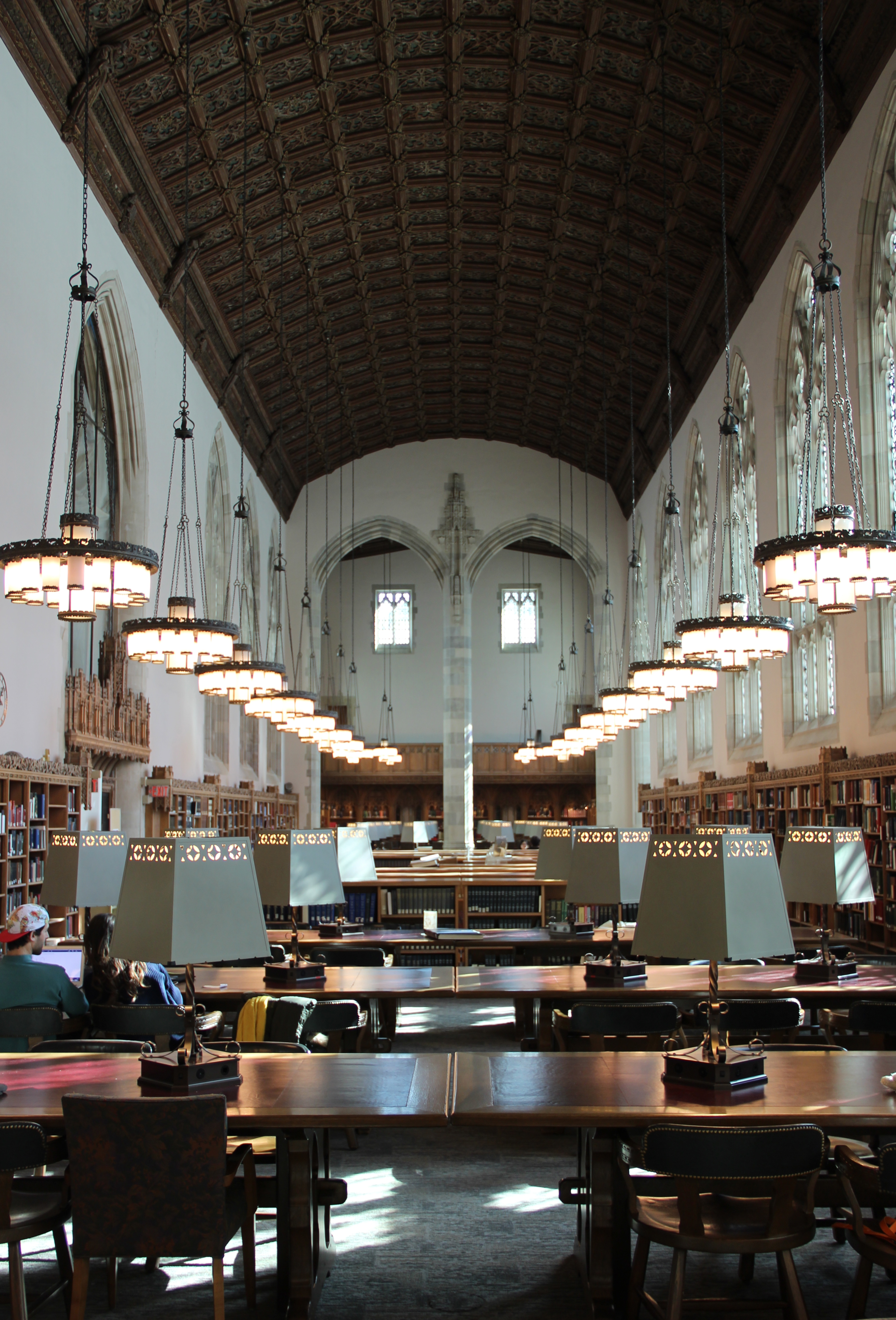
Starr Reading Room

Four reading rooms sit near the nave on the first floor of the library:

- Starr Reading Room, the main reading room of the library, is at the south end of the library, next to Trumbull College. It is a reference room designed in the style of a monastic refectory. Under a barrel-vaulted ceiling, the room is lined with traceried windows and oak bookshelves decorated with a botanical frieze. A 1998 restoration was funded by The Starr Foundation.
- The Periodical Reading Room, lined with oak shelves like those of the main reading room, is reached through from a vestibule on the north side of the nave. The room can hold 1,800 periodicals and features windows decorated with signs of the zodiac to symbolize periodicity.
- Linonia and Brothers Reading Room, a Tudor-style browsing room at the building's northeast corner. It is named for Yale's two 18th-century literary societies, Linonia and Brothers in Unity, and holds about 20,000 books. Intended to be a "gentlemen's club" for leisure reading, it was not opened to women until the 1960s.
- Franke Family Reading Room, a periodical browsing room, is in the library's southeast corner. Originally a room for frequently-used materials known as the Reserve Book Room, its collections were moved to Cross Campus Library in 1971.

The tower holds smaller reading rooms for the library's area studies holdings, including African, East Asian, Latin American, Near East, Slavic and East European, Southeast Asian, and Judaica collections. There are also dedicated reading rooms for several fields of study, including American Studies, History, and Philosophy.

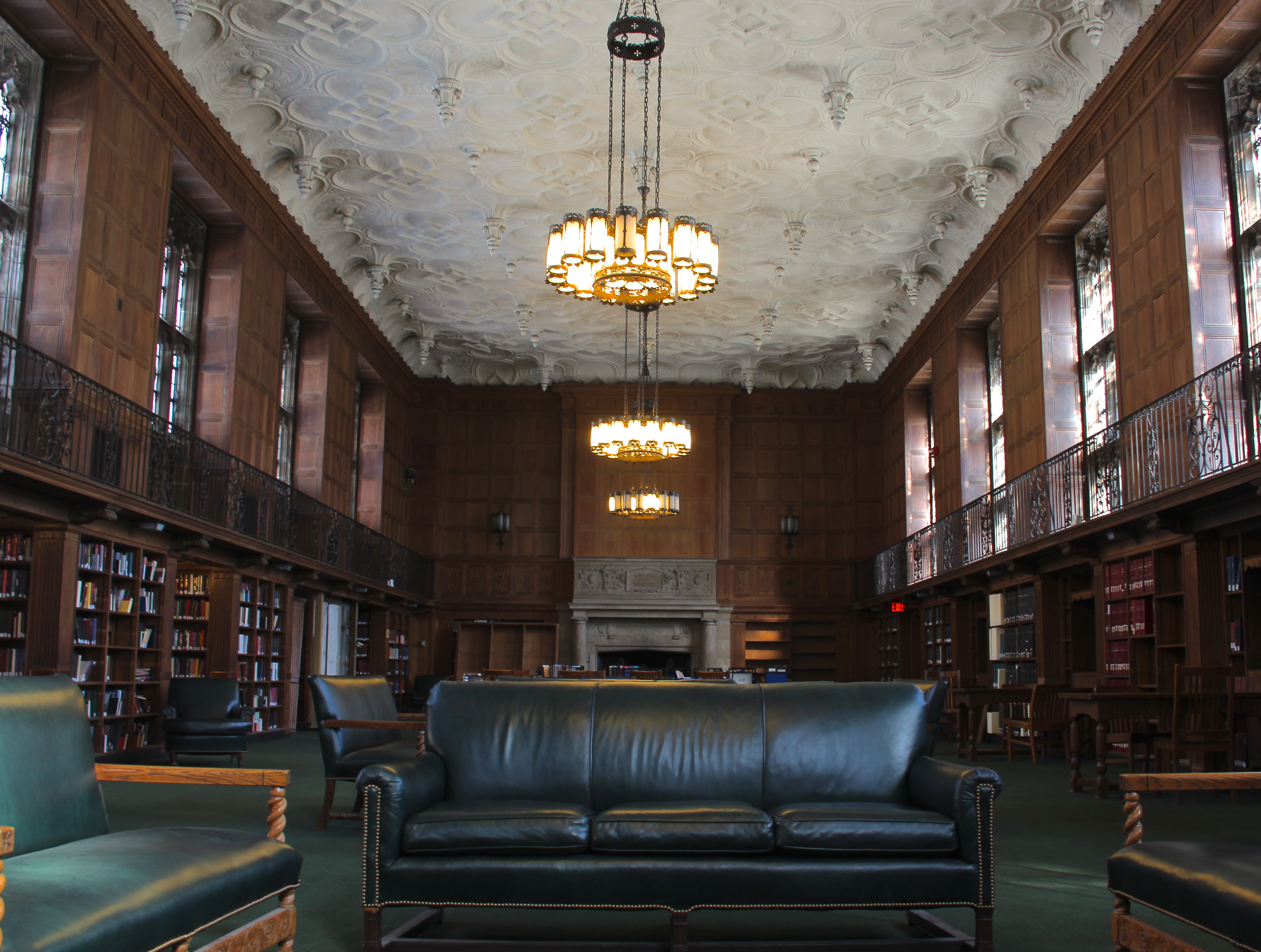
Linonia and Brothers Reading Room

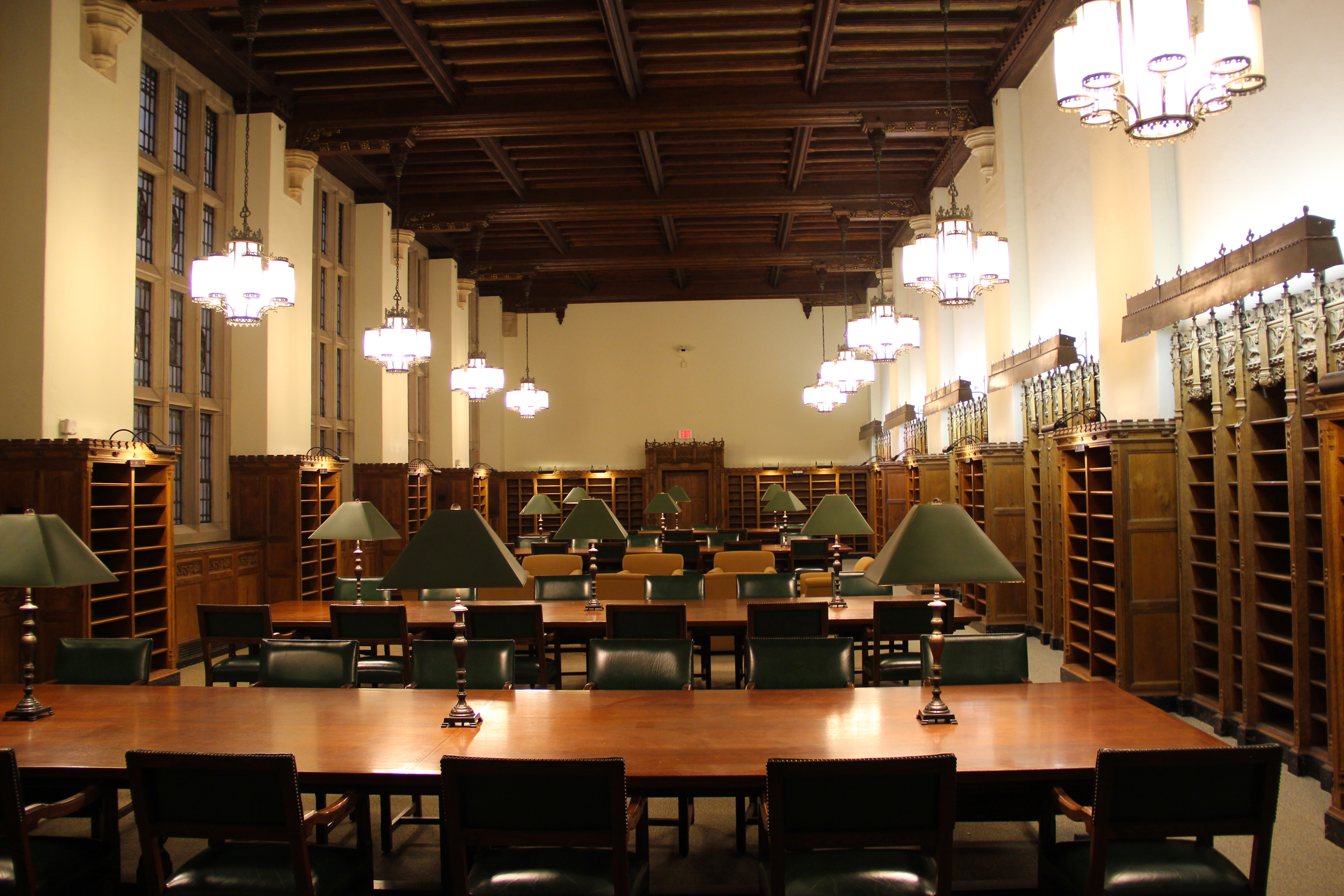
Periodical Reading Room

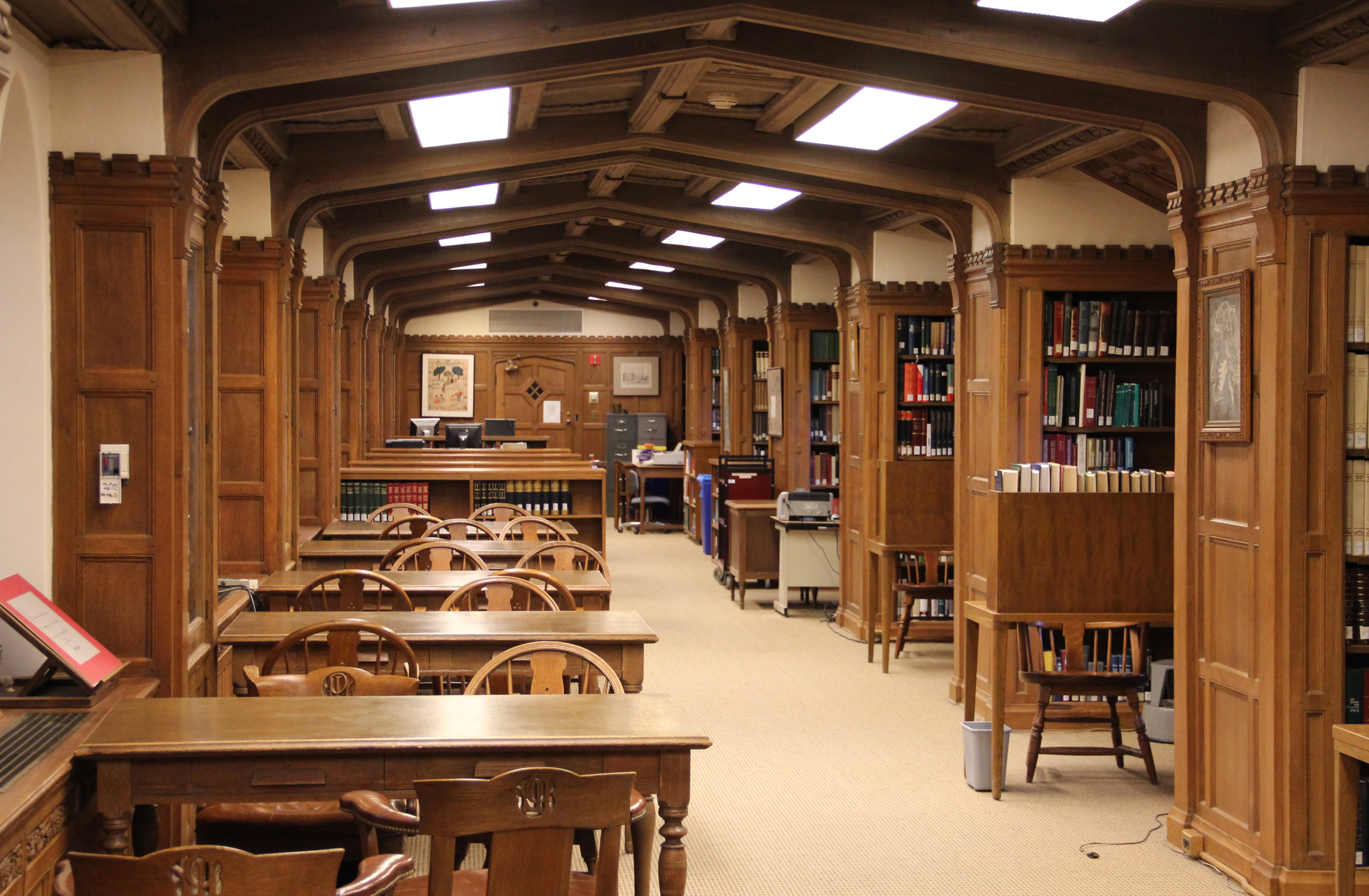
Slavic Reading Room

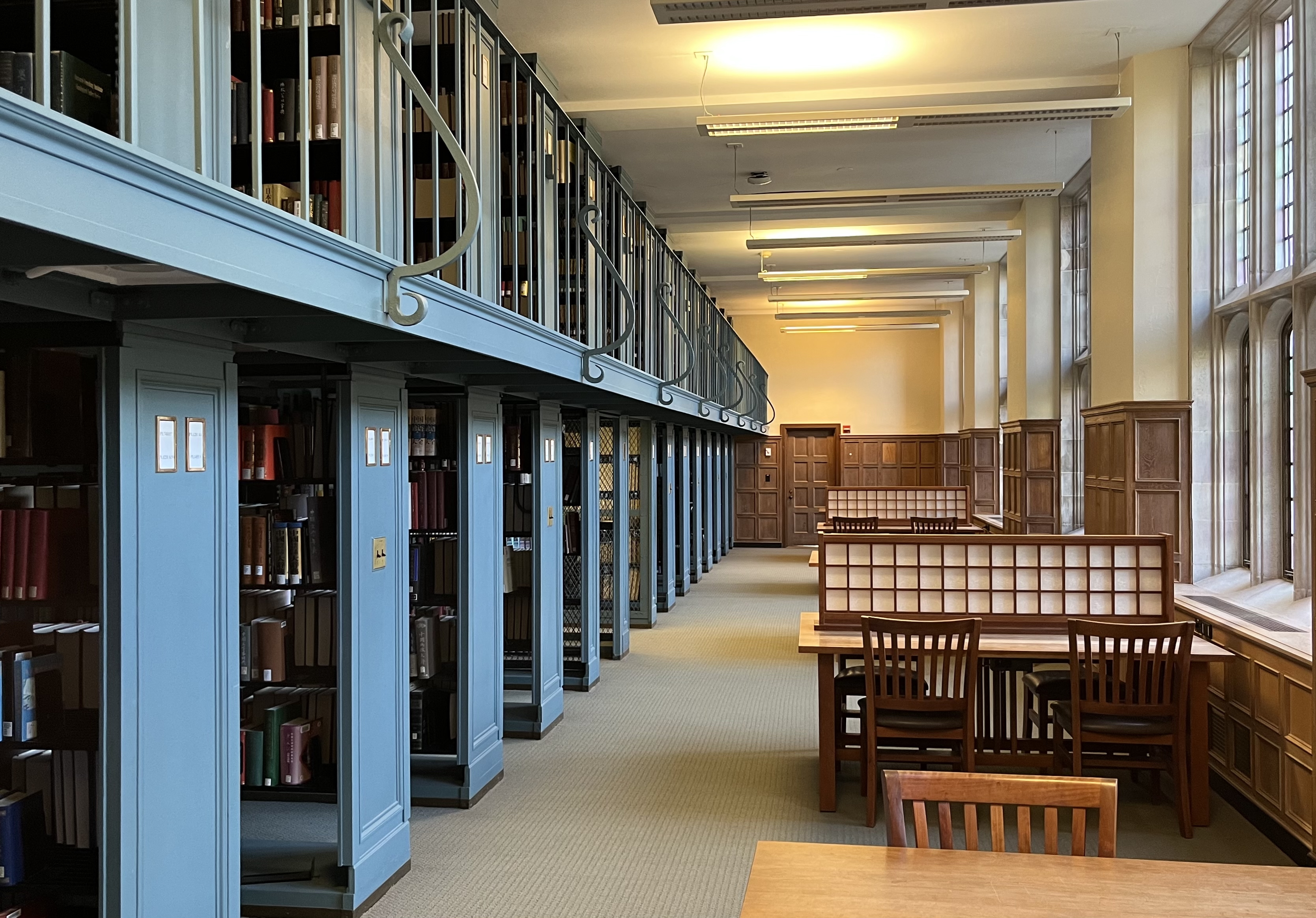
East Asia Library Reading Room

=== Wing ===
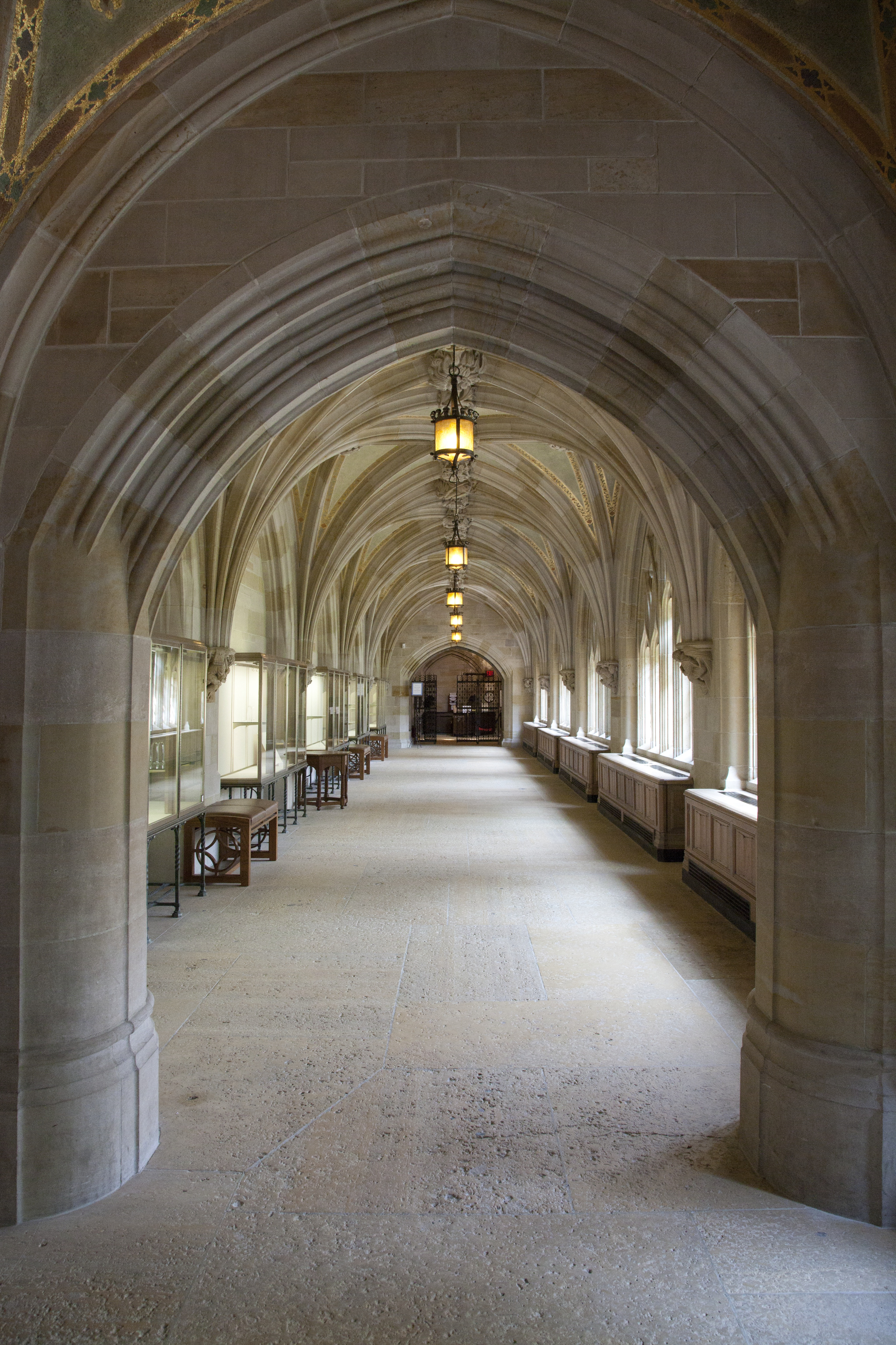
Cloister hallway leading from library's nave to its wing

Sterling's northern wing, accessed from the nave via a cloister hallway, contains the library's offices as well as three major rooms: a lecture hall, the Memorabilia Room, and the Rare Book Room. The Memorabilia Room hosts temporary exhibitions of Yale's archival collections and university history, and serves as an antechamber to the 120-seat lecture hall.

The Rare Book Room, designed after English Jacobean architecture, was built to allow library patrons to browse Yale's collection of rare books and manuscripts. A vaulted, octagonal chapel behind the room was specially constructed to house a copy of the Gutenberg Bible. The completion of the Beinecke Library in 1963 provided a more secure, climate-controlled repository for rare books, and the room and chapel now serve as a browsing room for the library's Manuscripts & Archives department.

=== Courtyard ===
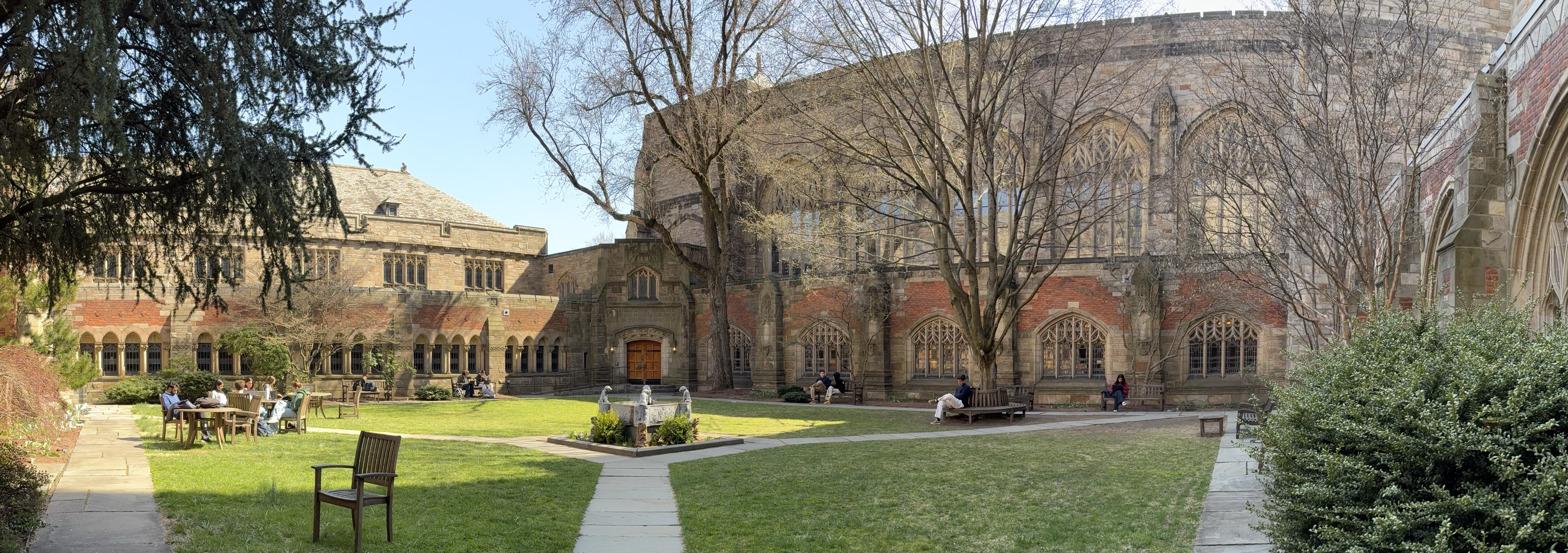
Selin Courtyard in early spring

The library originally had two courtyards designed and landscaped by Beatrix Farrand. In 1997, the western courtyard was enclosed and renovated to become the Irving S. Gilmore Music Library. Sterling's remaining courtyard, named the Selin Courtyard, features motifs from the history of printing.

== Decoration ==
The library is one of the most elaborate buildings on the Yale campus. Rogers commissioned artisans, including stained glass artist G. Owen Bonawit and blacksmith Samuel Yellin, who worked with Rogers on many of his buildings, sculptor Rene Paul Chambellan, and painter Eugene Savage. The building's exterior is decorated with stone gargoyles, reliefs, and inscriptions. The nave is the most ornately decorated library interior, although ornamental features, particularly stained-glass windows, can be found in nearly every room in the building.

=== Entrance relief ===
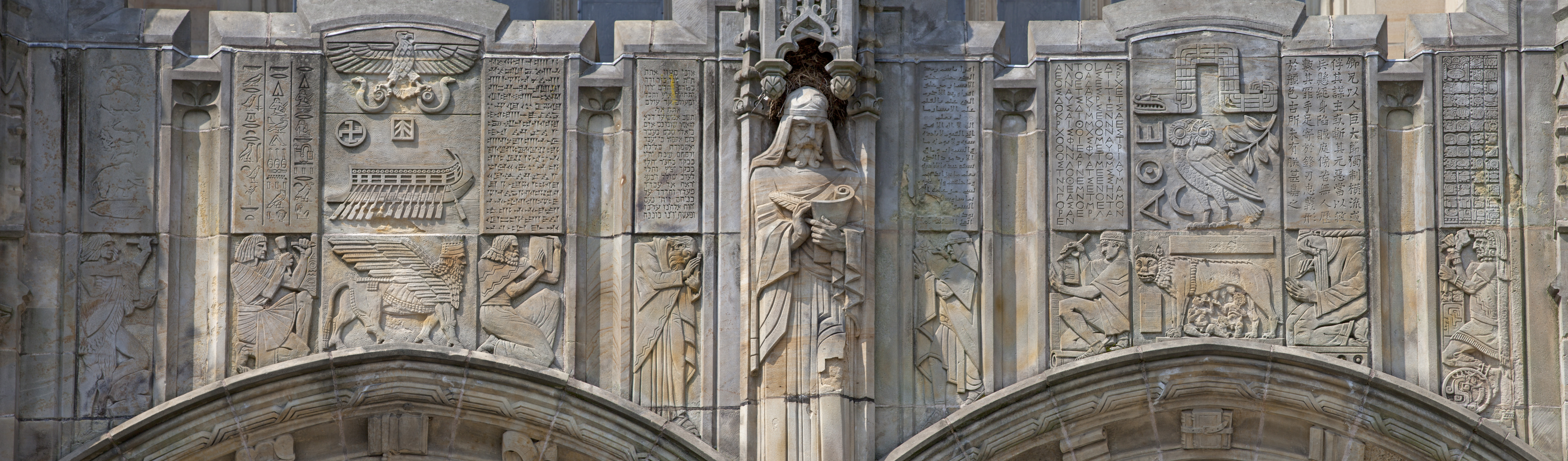
Relief above the front entrance doors on High Street

A limestone low relief above the library's main entrance symbolizes the scholarly achievements of ancient civilizations. It is the work of architectural sculptor Rene Paul Chambellan, who executed a design produced by Lee Lawrie. The scene depicts Cro-Magnon, Egyptian, Assyrian, Hebrew, Arab, Greek, Mayan, and Chinese scholars, with inscriptions from major works in each writing system. At center is a medieval scholar, and directly above the doors are symbolic representations of major civilizations, which include a Phoenician ship, a Babylonian lamassu and the Capitoline wolf of Rome.

=== Alma Mater mural ===
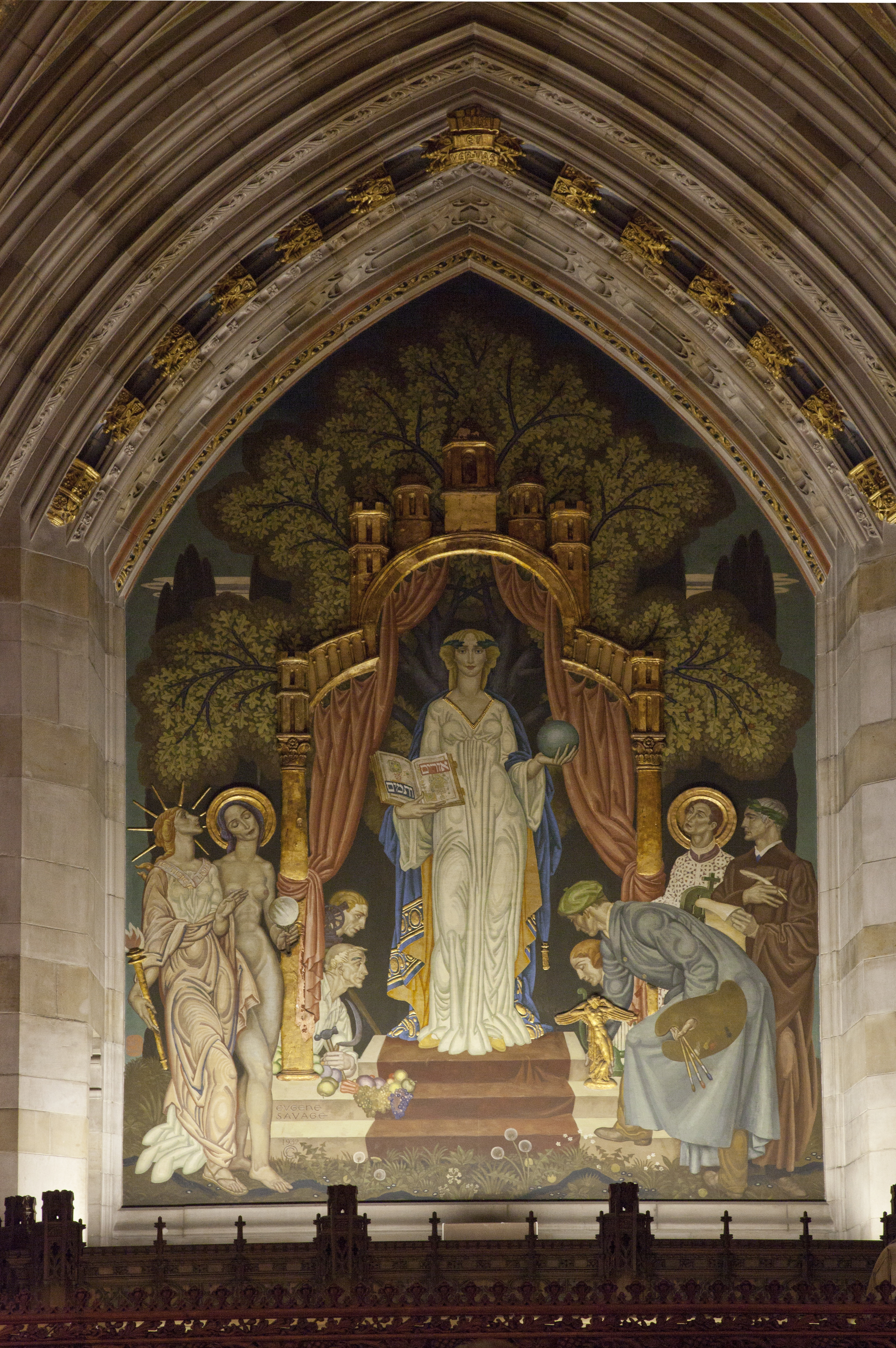
The Alma Mater mural

At the western end of the nave is a fresco painted by Eugene Savage, a professor in the Yale School of Art and Architecture. Savage titled it "The Imagination that Directs the University's Spiritual and Intellectual Efforts," but it is commonly known as the Alma Mater mural for its depiction of a personified "University." Savage, an expert in Early Renaissance techniques, painted the mural in his characteristic style, an Art Deco interpretation of traditional Renaissance composition. Surrounding "Alma Mater" are personifications of academic disciplines.

=== Stained glass ===
680 unique stained glass panels by G. Owen Bonawit adorn the nave, reading rooms, offices, and tower of the library. Eighty decorate the nave, depicting scenes from the history of Yale and New Haven. Most reading rooms have stained glass panels that represent themes from their subject matter. Bonawit's firm also designed over 2,000 small outline images to inset in windows without stained glass panes. Although Sterling contains the most in number, Bonawit's panels can be found in many of Yale's Gothic Revival buildings of the same period, including the Sterling Law Building, the Hall of Graduate Studies, and the residential colleges.

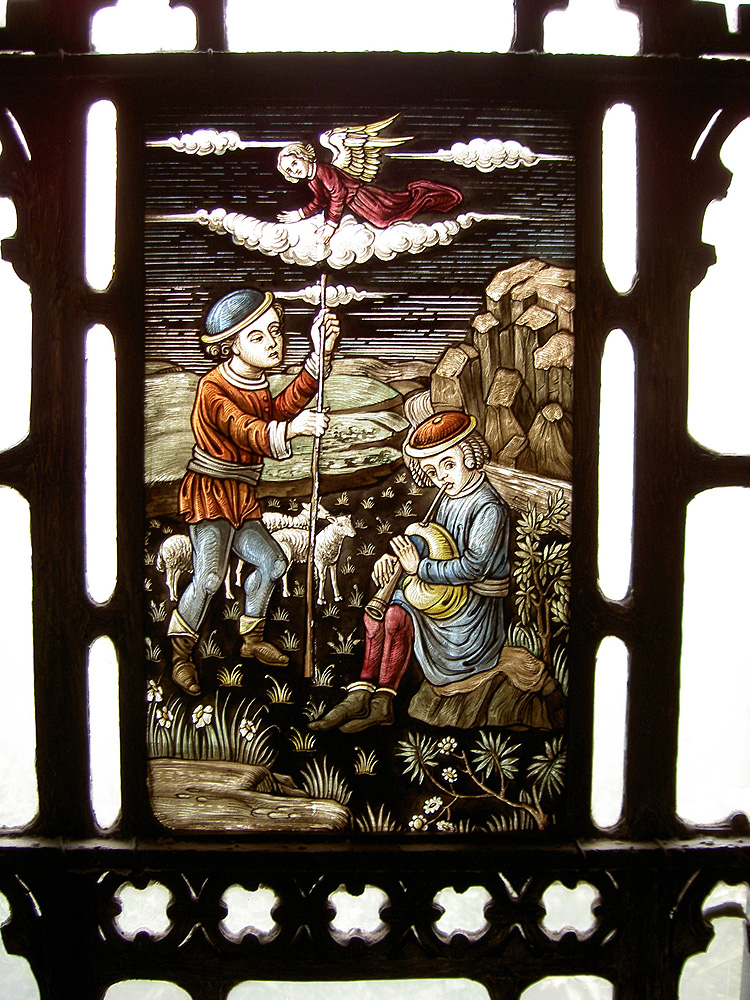

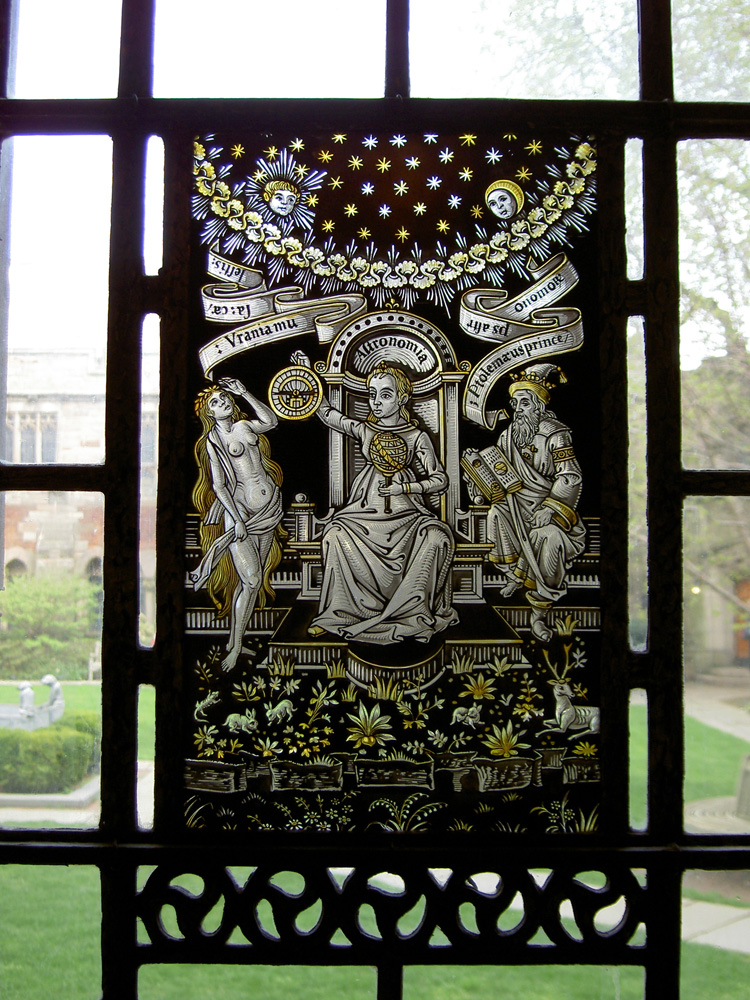

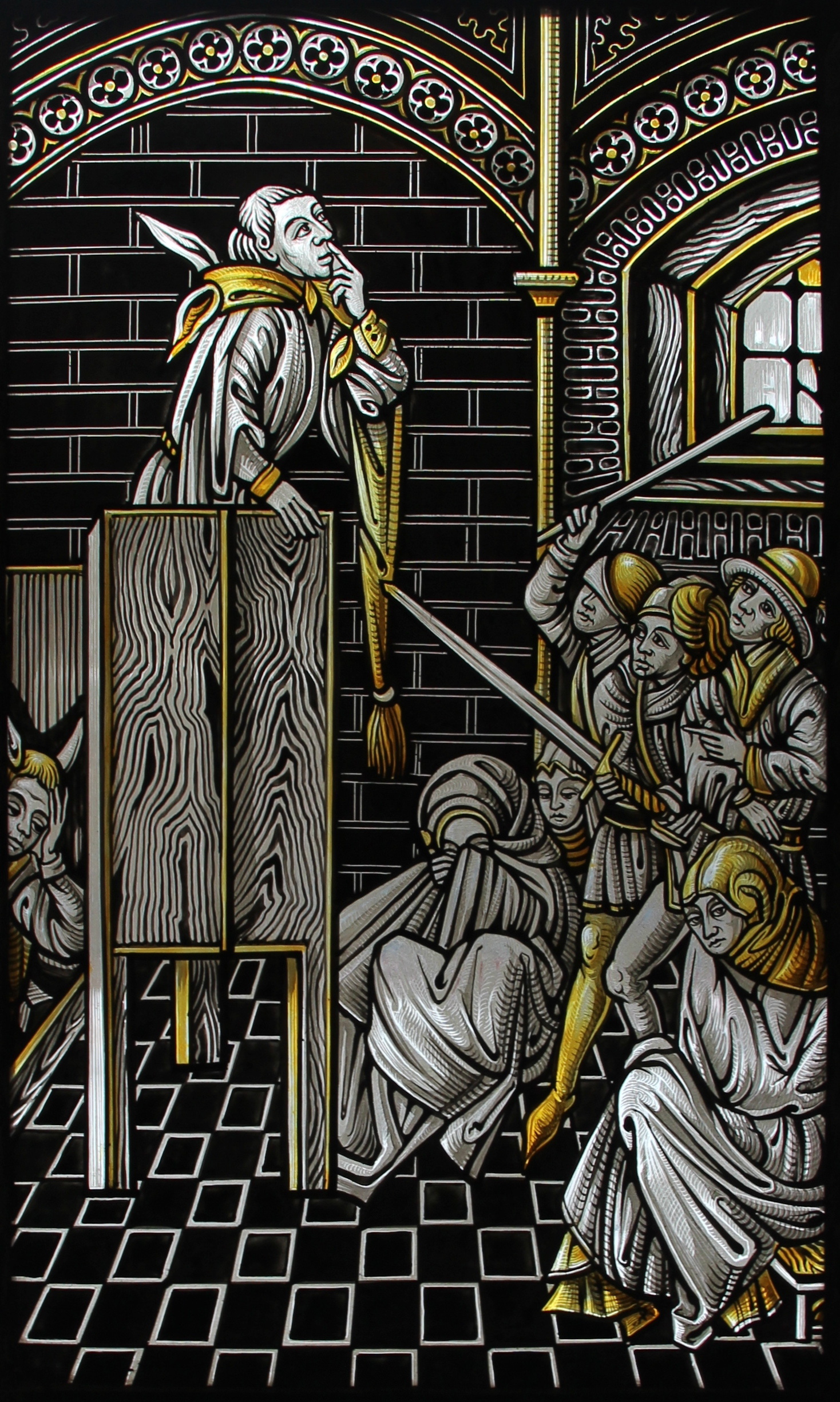

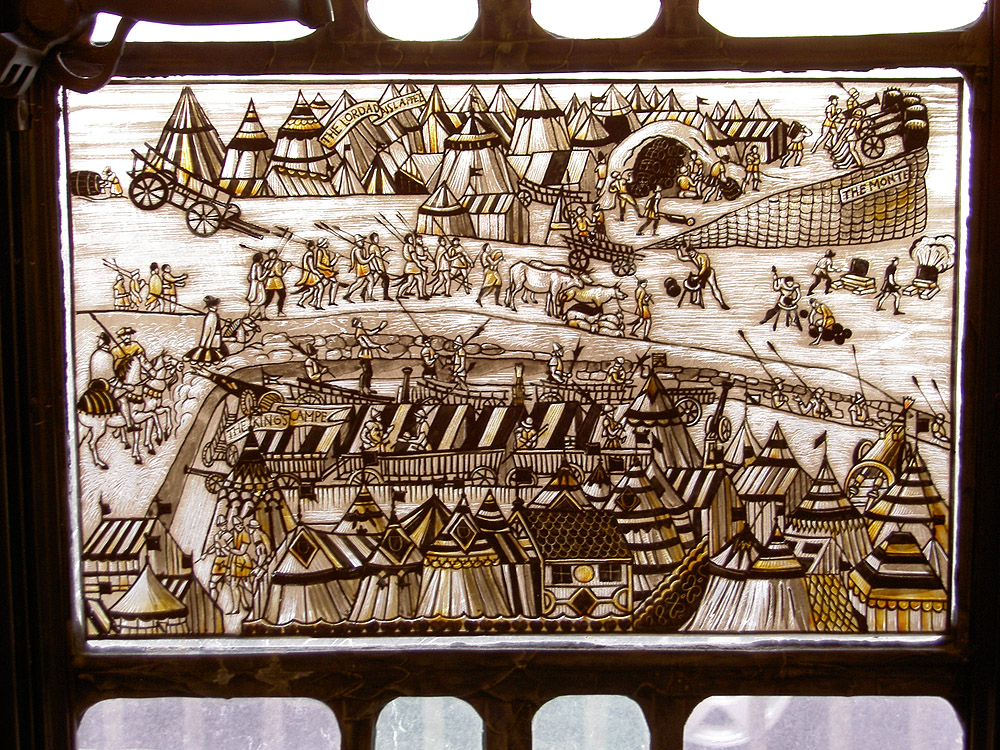

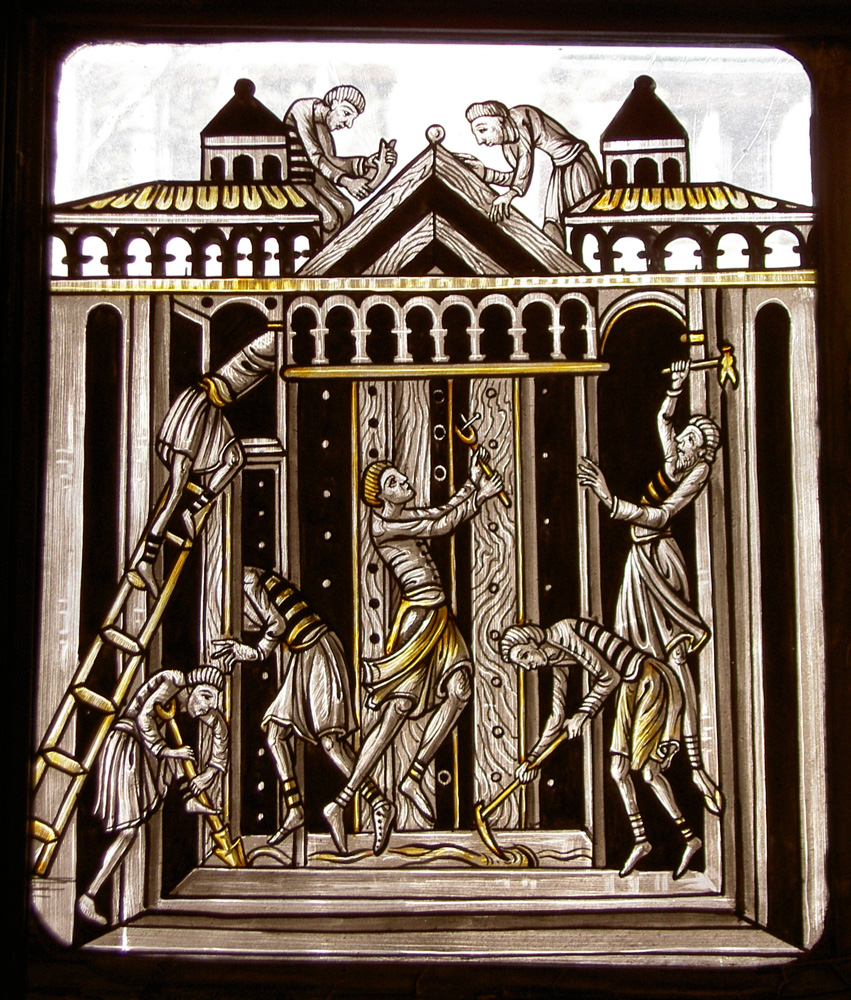

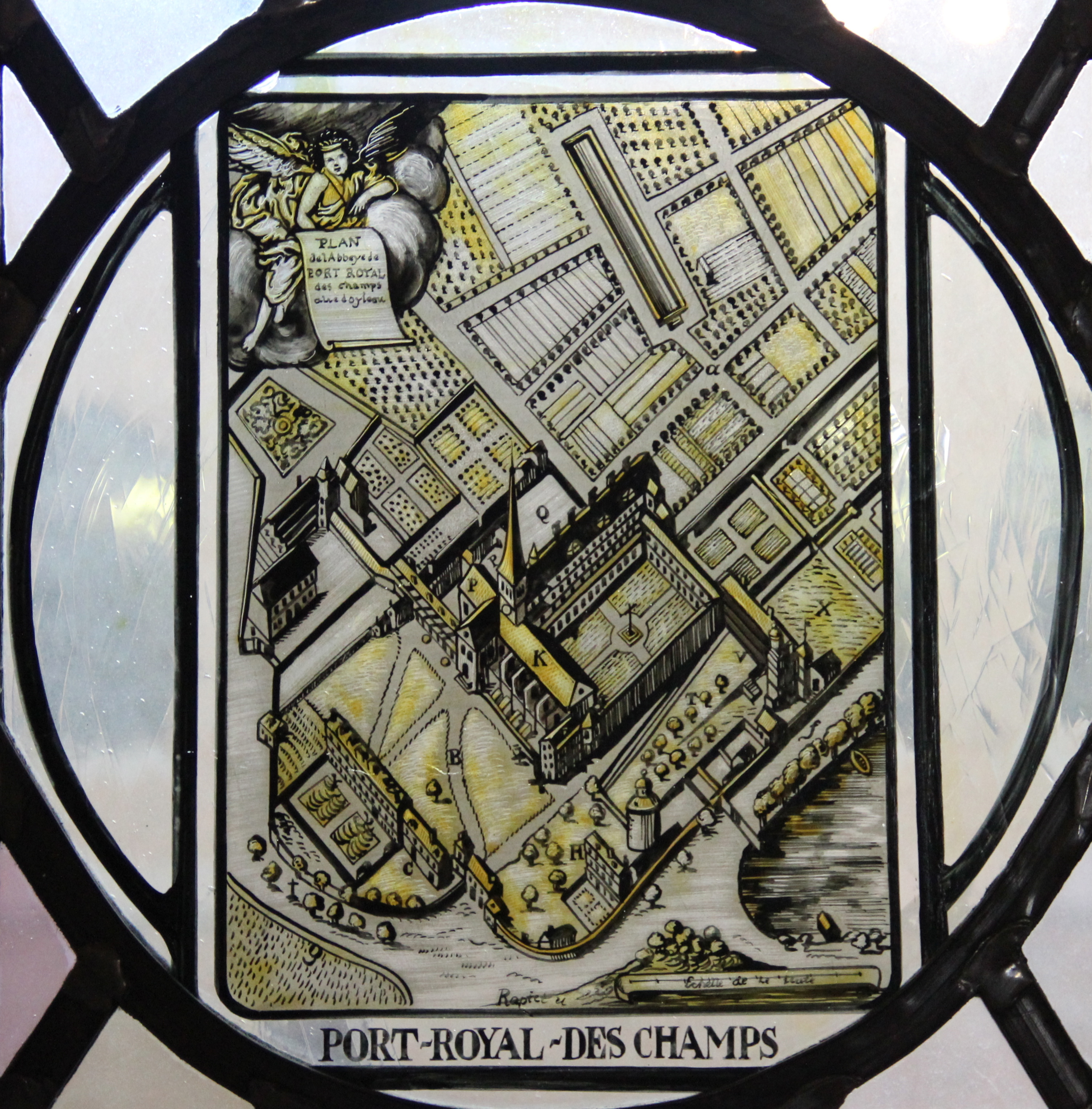

=== Other ornament ===
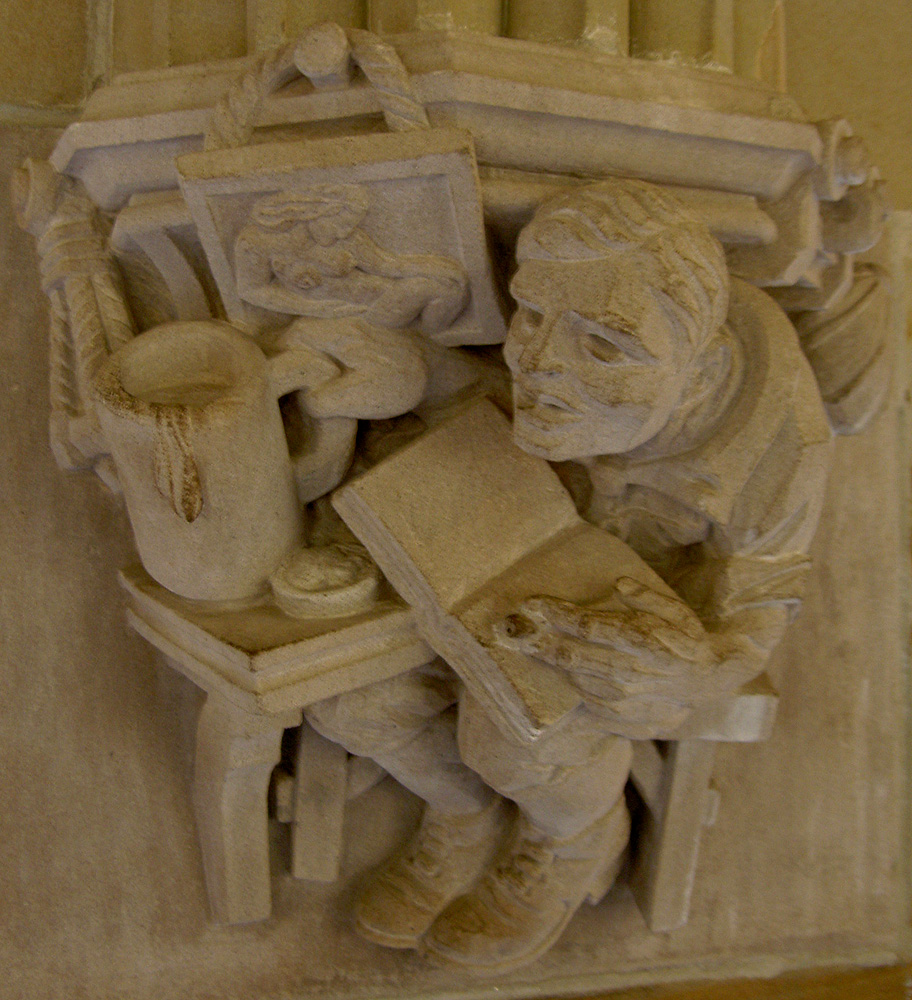
A corbel sculpted by Rene Paul Chambellan

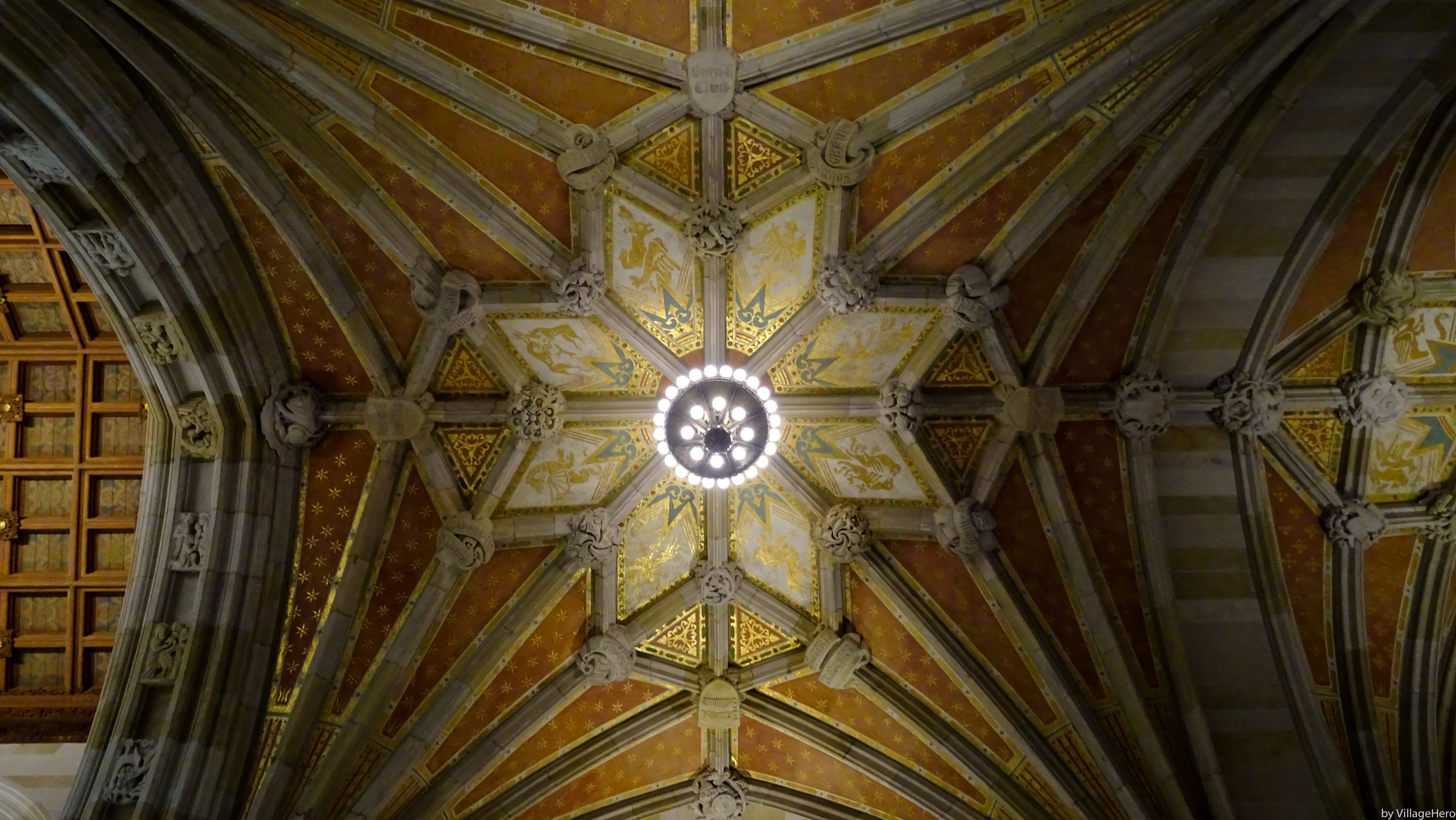
Nave ceiling, showing a painted ribbed vault with decorative bosses.

In the nave, ten high relief stone panels by Chambellan depict the history of the Yale University Library up to 1865. Bosses on the nave's ceiling depict writing implements. Samuel Yellin, the blacksmith who shaped most of the ironwork for Yale's Gothic buildings, created handwrought elevator doors for the Stacks depicting major trades, as well as ironwork and gates for the building. Other decorative stonework by Chambellan—gargoyles, corbels, and reliefs—can be found throughout the building. While most of his works depict scholarship and university life, several are humorous interpretations of the lives of students and librarians.

Several tributes in the library commemorate pioneering graduates of the university. A portrait of Edward Bouchet, one of Yale's earliest African American graduates, hangs in the nave's transept. Near the Franke Family Reading Room is a statue of Yung Wing, the first Chinese graduate of Yale. In 2016 a portrait of the first seven women to receive Ph.D.s from Yale, which those seven women all did in 1894, was placed in the library. The women include Mary Augusta Scott, Elizabeth Deering Hanscom, Margaretta Palmer, Charlotte Fitch Roberts, Cornelia H.B. Rogers, Sara Bulkley Rogers, and Laura Johnson Wylie. The portrait is the first painting hanging in the library to have women as subjects. Brenda Zlamany was the artist.

== Collections ==
=== Catalog ===
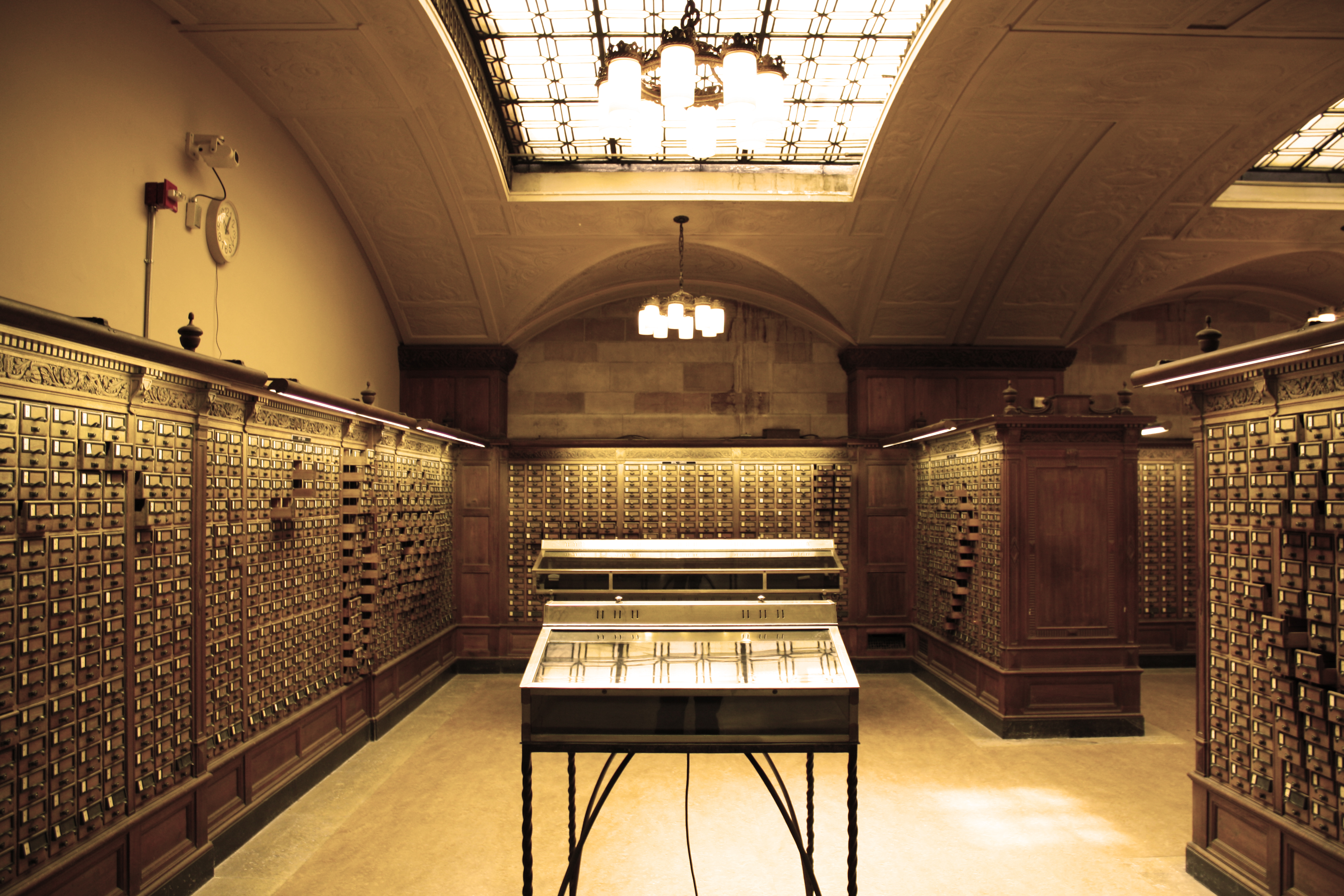
Card catalogs stood in echelons in the nave in this 2010 image. A computer catalog now serves that information, and, since 2014, tables and chairs for student use fill that space.

The large majority of materials in Sterling are housed in the bookstacks, which are contained in the building's tower. The bookstacks use two classification systems: the Yale Library system and the Library of Congress system. Adopted in the 1890s, the non-standard Yale system became cumbersome and inefficient for cataloging. Though replaced in 1970 by the Library of Congress system, many of the 5.7 million volumes held by the library at that time remain filed in the Yale system. The card catalogs in the nave once contained as many as 9.5 million cards, sorted in 8,700 trays.

=== Manuscripts & Archives ===
Manuscripts & Archives is the primary archival repository of the university, housing Yale memorabilia, university archives, historical manuscripts, and personal papers donated to the university. Though the archive uses the former Rare Book Room as its primary reading room, most of the collection is held off-site. Significant materials within Manuscripts & Archives include the papers of Charles Lindbergh, Eero Saarinen, Eli Whitney, John Maley and the audio library of Osama bin Laden. The archives hosts a notable collection of diplomatic papers, including those of Dean Acheson, Henry Kissinger, Henry Stimson, and Cyrus Vance.

=== Music Library ===
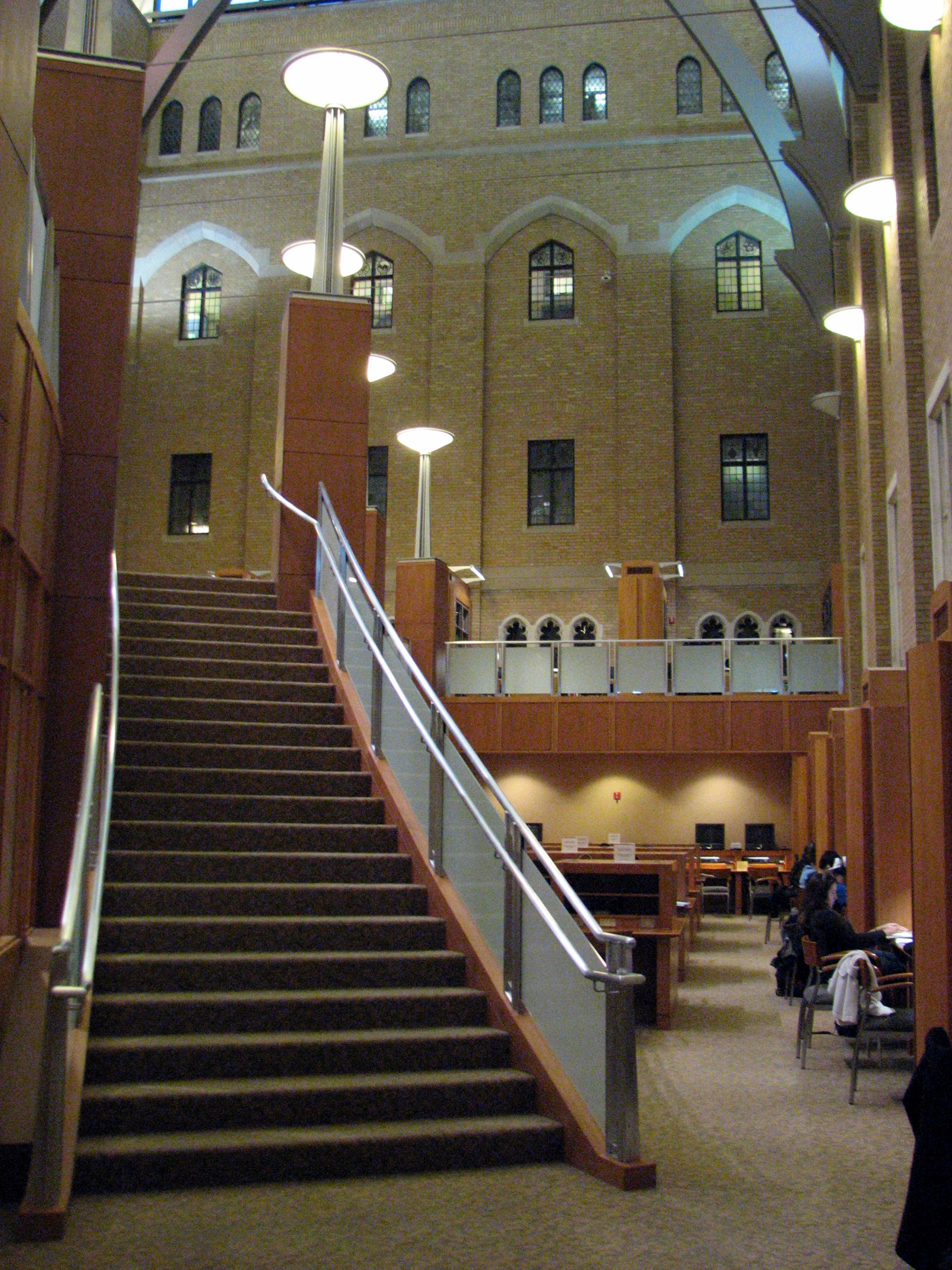
Irving S. Gilmore Music Library main staircase

Audio, visual, and paper materials related to music are retained in the Irving S. Gilmore Music Library, a facility converted from one of Sterling's courtyards. The collection was established in the mid-19th century under Gustave J. Stoeckel, and was expanded by the acquisition of Lowell Mason's papers and library in 1873. Its collections include one of the largest catalogs of recordings and scores in the United States, including the papers of Charles Ives, Carl Ruggles, Quincy Porter, Horatio Parker, Virgil Thomson, Clarence Watters, Richard Donovan, and J. Rosamond Johnson. The collection was moved to Sprague Hall of the Yale School of Music in 1955, then to Sterling after the Gilmore Library was completed in 1997.

=== Film Archive ===
The seventh floor of Sterling Memorial Library holds the Yale Film Archive, which holds collections of more than 7,000 film elements, including hundreds of unique 35mm and 16mm prints and original negatives, as well as more than 50,000 items in its circulating video collection. The archive, which grew from a small collection of 16mm prints acquired for use in teaching film in 1968, was formally established in 1982 and moved to Sterling in 2021. Its collections include original material by filmmakers including Mary Ellen Bute, Frank Mouris, Warrington Hudlin, and Willie Ruff. The Film Archive collects, preserves, and screens films in its collection, and is an Associate of the International Federation of Film Archives.

=== Special collections ===
The library houses several special collections:

- The Yale Babylonian Collection, the largest collection of Babylonian cuneiform writing in North America;
- The library of the American Oriental Society, the oldest American learned society for area studies, whose catalog has been housed at Yale since 1855;
- The Map Collection, a collection of over 200,000 print maps as well as Geographic Information Systems data;
- Arts of the Book, a variety of materials related to printing, bookbinding, woodblock, and graphic design.
- The "Near East Collection holds one of the most comprehensive assemblies of Arabic and Islamic studies materials in the US."

=== Major editorial projects ===
- The Papers of Benjamin Franklin, a project founded in 1954 to collect and publish all the papers of Benjamin Franklin. The library received a major donation of Franklin's papers when Sterling opened in 1935, and the collection formed the basis of Yale professor Edmund Morgan's best-selling biography of Franklin.
- The Fortunoff Video Archive for Holocaust Testimonies, a collection of about 4,500 video-recorded testimonies from witness and survivors of the Holocaust, deposited in the library in 1981.
- Boswell Editions, an edited collection of the papers and publications of Scottish lawyer James Boswell, the major biographer of the famous 18th century English literary figure Samuel Johnson.
- Wing STC Revision Project, an effort begun in 1933 by Yale librarian Donald Wing to compile a Short-Title Catalogue, a bibliographic reference for books printed in England and its colonies between 1641 and 1700.
