= John Maley =

American explorer

John Maley (ca. 1776, New York – July 16, 1819, Goose Creek, South Carolina) was an American explorer and a contemporary of Meriwether Lewis, William Clark and Zebulon Pike. In 1815, he wrote a journal of his travels through the trans-Mississippi West in the early 19th century.

Researchers have discovered that the Maley journal that has been housed at Yale University for nearly 200 years is the second half of a larger work. The first half was found in a rare book shop in Philadelphia and acquired in 2012 by Southern Methodist University.

The second half of Maley’s journal as housed at Yale contains his writings on three trading expeditions, taking place between 1811 and 1813, up the Red River from Natchitoches (Nackitosh) through the interior of Louisiana and North Texas. Maley describes the customs of the Kashotoos, Hietans, Pawnees and other Native American tribes, as well as their relations with the Spanish in Texas. This document has been housed at Yale University since 1824. Originally the property of Benjamin Silliman (1779–1864), one of Yale's first professors of science, the Maley journal was part of a collection of correspondence, lectures, notebooks, diaries, journals and other materials given to Yale by the Silliman family and now housed in the university's Sterling Memorial Library.

The existence of the first half of the journal was unknown until Southern Methodist University acquired it in 2012 from Michael Brown Rare Books, LLC, in Philadelphia. An Account of Four Years Travels 1808-1812 recounts Maley's journeys through present-day Illinois, Indiana, Ohio, Missouri, Oklahoma, Texas, New Mexico, Kentucky, Tennessee, Arkansas and Louisiana. The journal includes Maley's descriptions of agriculture, mines and mineral deposits, as well as the inhabitants of settlers’ villages and Native American camps.

After about 188 handwritten pages, abruptly and in mid-sentence, the SMU half of the Maley journal comes to an end. The story is continued and completed in the volume at the Yale library.

Maley's work is not entirely unknown to historians, due to the partial journal in Yale's Silliman papers and a better-known journal (also part of the Silliman collection) on the Texas Iron, the largest collected meteorite in the world for most of the 19th century and still the largest preserved find from Texas. However, scholarly opinion has been divided on the Yale journal's authenticity due to the lack of knowledge about Maley himself. William H. Goetzmann writes in Exploration and Empire: “My account of Maley’s incredible and hitherto unknown adventures is based on his own manuscript journal, purchased for Yale by Professor Benjamin Silliman. So obscure a figure is Maley that it has been impossible to check the veracity of his account on all points. The reader is therefore warned to accept his story only on the most tentative basis, subject to confirmation or denial by further detailed research."

Some of the mystery surrounding Maley can be explained by his own solitary nature. Michael Brown writes: "Maley was a classic loner, often traveling by himself, or at most with one other person. His solo travels across the remotest portions of America were greeted with incredulity by scholars; now teenagers sailing alone around the world are almost commonplace. A wanderer, he was often out in the wilderness when census or other records were being compiled. There is a paucity of documentary evidence concerning Maley’s travels. However when checking such records for people Maley encountered on his travels, census records confirm Maley’s often detailed accounts of exactly how many individuals were in a given household or establishment."

The Maley journal represents the four millionth volume added to the SMU libraries. The university chose 2013 as "The Year of the Library" to celebrate the 100th anniversary of the 1913 creation of SMU's first library, the hiring of its first librarian and the acquisition of its first book. The journal was presented to SMU’s DeGolyer Library by the university's board of trustees to celebrate the April 25, 2013 opening of the George W. Bush Presidential Center on the SMU campus.

The first half of Maley's journal has been digitized and will be available for viewing at SMU's DeGolyer Library website.
