= Bass Library =

Academic library at Yale University, USA

Coordinates: 41.31065°N 72.9276°W

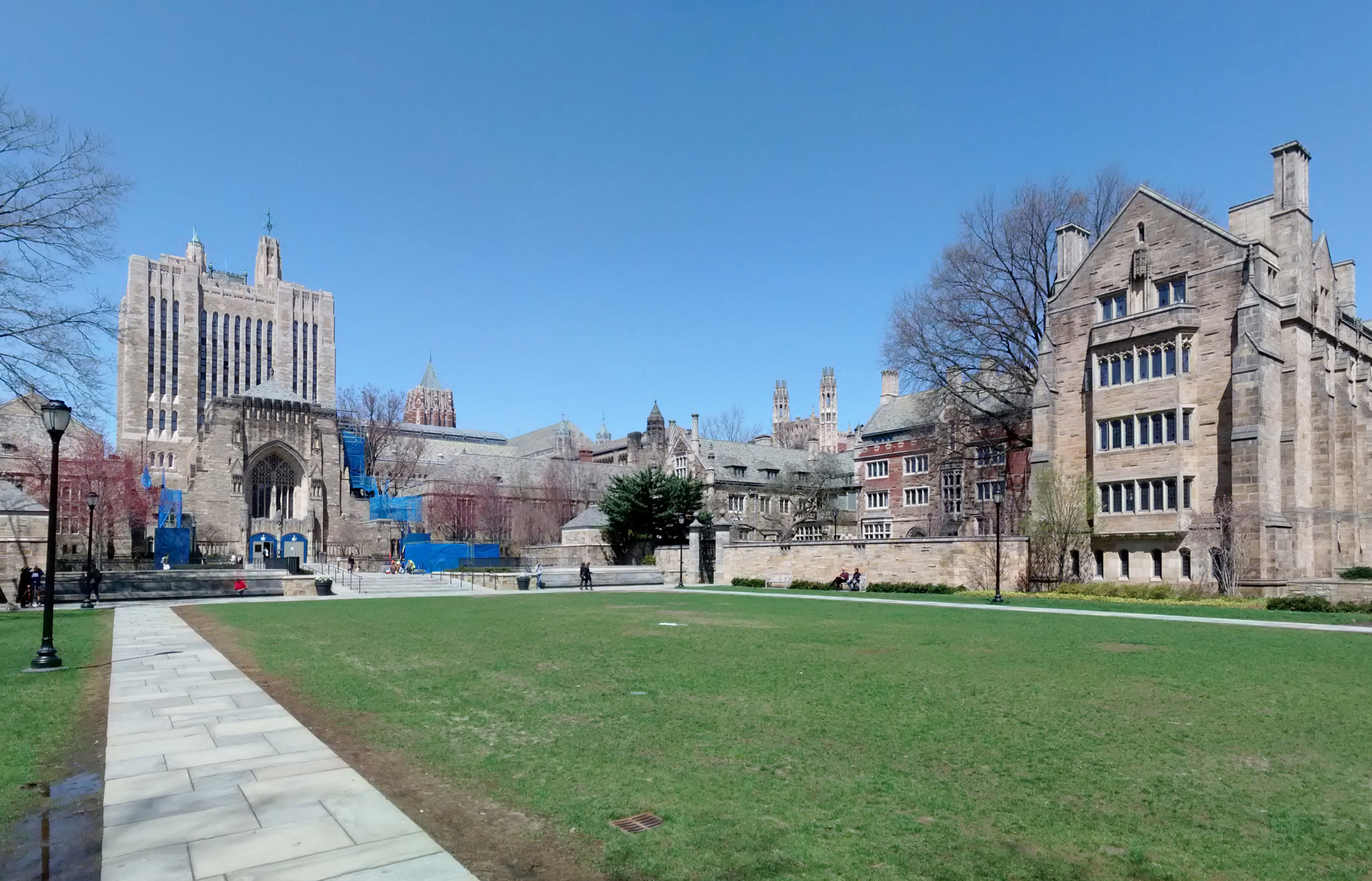
Bass Library is located underground below Cross Campus, Yale University, New Haven, CT.

The Anne T. & Robert M. Bass Library, formerly Cross Campus Library, is a Yale University Library building holding frequently-used materials in the humanities and social sciences. Located underneath Yale University's Cross Campus, it was completed in 1971 in a minimalist-functionalist style designed by Edward Larrabee Barnes. In 2007, Thomas Beeby led a multimillion-dollar renovation of the library that extensively reconfigured and refurbished its interior space.

In addition to its book collection, Bass contains many reading and studying spaces, a media equipment library, and an area for books held in reserve.

== History ==
In 1967, an extension of Sterling Memorial Library was proposed to expand the library's space for collections. Though originally proposed to house the library's East Asian collection and Yale memorabilia, librarians decided instead to utilize the new space to improve access to frequently-used materials and reserve books. So as not to interrupt the view of the Sterling facade from the east, the library would be constructed beneath the lawn of Cross Campus, the central axis of Yale's campus. To allow for sufficient light underground, architect Edward Larrabee Barnes proposed to sink sixteen skylights into the Cross Campus lawn. When the design was made public in 1968, Yale students and faculty, including Vincent Scully, protested that the skylights would obstruct the lawn's open space, and students physically blocked early construction activities. Barnes and the university withdrew the original design and instead configured a lighting scheme with four large entrance light wells at the corners of Cross Campus. The new library, opened in January 1971 at a cost of $4 million, housed 300,000 volumes and remained open 24 hours a day.

Although the protestors' concerns were addressed in the redesign, reception of the new Cross Campus Library was generally poor. The underground location posed significant structural and architectural challenges to the facility: the sod-covered roof persistently leaked, and the light wells let in little natural light. Students described its functional aesthetic and fluorescent lighting as "antiseptic."

In 2004, Yale announced a major renovation of Cross Campus Library. The two-year, US$47.8 million project, led by Thomas Beeby, was completed in October 2007. The library was renamed Bass Library after the renovation's lead donors, Anne and Robert Bass of Texas who donated nearly $20 million toward the effort.

In 2019, Yale announced plans to expand study areas by transferring approximately 100,000 rarely used or duplicate titles to the adjacent Sterling Memorial Library. The proposed renovation would leave Bass Library with a collection of approximately 40,000 volumes, while seating capacity would expand from 365 to 470. After students objected, a revised plan was announced with 61,000 books to be retained in Bass library and an accelerated completion timeline to have the library available to students for the fall 2019 semester.

== Building ==
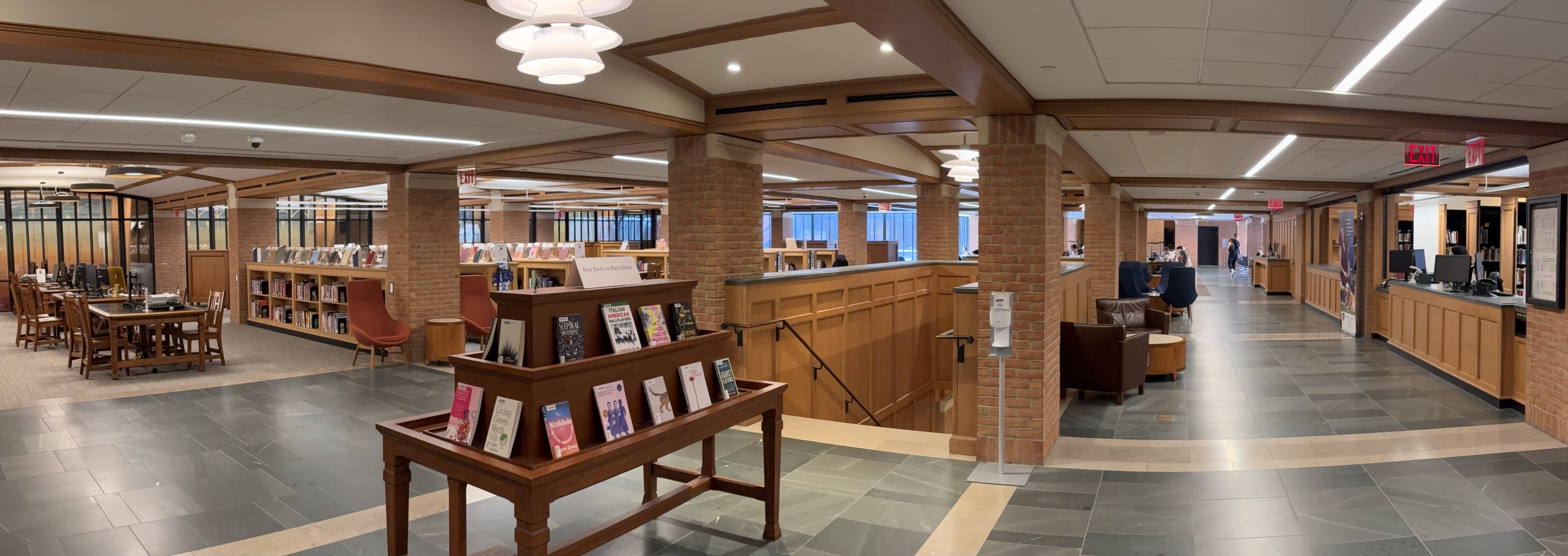
Interior of Bass Library

The library has two subterranean floors totaling 60,000 square feet (5,600 m^{2}) which can be accessed from Cross Campus or Sterling Memorial Library. The 2007 renovation by HBRA Architects, intended to harmonize the library's interiors with those of surrounding Gothic Revival buildings, refurbished the building with stone floors, steel mullions and wood-panelled shelves and interior walls. Kent Bloomer, a Yale School of Architecture professor, designed ornaments for the Cross Campus entrances, which reference Gothic elements of Sterling Memorial Library.

The library is noted on campus for its "weenie bins," small cubicles available for private study.

== Collections ==
The library holds approximately 150,000 books, and had held 50,000 more before its renovation. In 2008, the Yale College Council debuted a DVD film collection to be housed in Bass for student use. By 2024, all DVDs from this collection were removed and/or relocated to the Yale Film Archive. The library also loans digital media equipment to Yale University staff, students, and faculty, including DSLR cameras, audio equipment, lighting kits, and Google Glass.
