= David Evans (geologist) =

David A. D. Evans
- Born: 7 April 1970 (age 56); Milwaukee, Wisconsin, United States
- Education: Yale College, California Institute of Technology
- Known for: Geology
- Scientific career
- Fields: Paleomagnetism, Supercontinents
- Workplaces: Yale University

David A. D. Evans is an American professor of geology and geophysics at Yale University. He works on quantitative reconstruction of supercontinents. He is involved in the Snowball Earth theory of Precambrian ice ages by demonstrating that the magnetic latitudes of ancient ice deposits were tropical. He is also the head of Berkeley College, one of Yale's fourteen residential colleges.

== Biography ==
Evans was born and raised in Milwaukee, Wisconsin, the second child of a lawyer and a homemaker. He attended Nicolet High School in Milwaukee. He received his undergraduate degree in geology and geophysics from Yale College in 1992. He completed his graduate work at the California Institute of Technology. He is married to Lely Dai Evans, with children Corinne (born 2002) and Jamie (born 2003).

=== Career ===
Using paleomagnetism of rocks from South Africa, Australia, Canada, Brazil, Russia and China, Evans has worked to reassemble the configuration of supercontinents that preceded Pangea. He was a member of drilling projects of the Kaapvaal craton with the Agouron institute for geobiology, and a member of the scientific team to develop a large igneous province global "barcode" record of plume magmatism on Earth. He has also contributed primary data demonstrating that ancient ice ages had continental ice sheets reaching tropical latitudes, which has been incorporated into the Snowball Earth theory of the planet's long term paleoclimate. Evans is involved with the latest efforts at reconstructing the history of supercontinents on Earth through the last three billion years. He is the Director of Undergraduate Studies in the Department of Geology and Geophysics at Yale University; and the current coordinator of field student expeditions to locations including Norway, Queensland, Australia, British Columbia, Canada, New Zealand, and South Africa, as well as undergraduate excursions to Sicily and Barbados. He has spent sabbatical leaves in Taiwan and Australia, where he studied modern and ancient mountain building processes. Evans is a 2002 honoree of the Packard Fellowship in Science and Engineering, and a finalist for the Blavatnik Awards for young scientists.

=== Interests ===
Evans musical interests include Bela Fleck and Victor Wooten, Ludwig van Beethoven, Public Enemy, and Claude Debussy. At Yale, he has performed with the Berkeley College Orchestra as a bassist, both as an undergraduate student and a professor. He is known to colleagues and students as 'Majestic D,' his alter ego who infuses hip hop culture with educational geology themes. He is fluent in German and proficient in Chinese.

== Selected bibliography ==
- Evans, D. A.; Beukes, N. J.; Kirschvink, J. L. (1997), "Low-latitude glaciation in the Palaeoproterozoic era", Nature, vol. 386, no. 6622, pp. 262–266, Bibcode:1997Natur.386..262E, doi:10.1038/386262a0, S2CID 4364730
- Evans, David A. (1998), "True polar wander, a supercontinental legacy", Earth Planet. Sci. Lett., vol. 157, no. 1–2, pp. 1–8, Bibcode:1998E&PSL.157....1E, doi:10.1016/s0012-821x(98)00031-4
- Evans, David A. D. (2000), "Stratigraphic, geochronological, and paleomagnetic constraints upon the Neoproterozoic climatic paradox", Am. J. Sci., vol. 300, no. 5, pp. 347–433, Bibcode:2000AmJS..300..347E, doi:10.2475/ajs.300.5.347, archived from the original on 2011-07-24
- Evans, D. A. D. (2003), "A fundamental Precambrian-Phanerozoic shift in Earth's glacial style?", Tectonophysics, vol. 375, no. 1–4, pp. 353–385, Bibcode:2003Tectp.375..353E, doi:10.1016/s0040-1951(03)00345-7
- Evans, David A. D. (2003), "True polar wander and supercontinents", Tectonophysics, vol. 362, no. 1–4, pp. 303–320, Bibcode:2003Tectp.362..303E, doi:10.1016/s0040-1951(02)000642-x
- Evans, David A. D. (2006), "Proterozoic low orbital obliquity and axial-dipolar geomagnetic field from evaporite palaeolatitudes", Nature, vol. 444, no. 7115, pp. 51–55, Bibcode:2006Natur.444...51E, doi:10.1038/nature05203, PMID 17080082, S2CID 4356202
- Evans, David A. D. (2009), "The palaeomagnetically viable, long-lived and all-inclusive Rodinia reconstruction", Geol. Soc. London Spec. Paper, vol. 327, pp. 371–404, doi:10.1144/sp327.16, S2CID 37249680

== See also ==
- Snowball Earth
- Supercontinents
