= Yale College =

Undergraduate college of Yale University

- Coat of arms of Yale College
- Former name: The Collegiate School
- Motto: אורים ותמים (Hebrew; ʾÛrîm wə-Tummîm)
- Motto in English: Light and truth
- Type: Private
- Established: 1701; 325 years ago
- Parent institution: Yale University
- Dean: Pericles Lewis
- Undergraduates: 6,740 (2025)
- Location: New Haven, Connecticut, United States; 41°18′28″N 72°55′44″W
- Alumni: 75,021^{[b]}
- Website: yalecollege.yale.edu
- ^{[b]} The number of living alumni as of the year 2012

Yale College is the undergraduate college of Yale University. Founded in 1701, it is the original school of the university. Although other Yale schools were founded as early as 1810, all of Yale was officially known as Yale College until 1887, when its schools were confederated and the institution was renamed Yale University.

Originally established to train Congregationalist ministers and lay people, the college began teaching humanities and natural sciences by the late 18th century. At the same time, students began organizing extracurricular organizations: first literary societies, and later publications, sports teams, and singing groups. By the middle of the 19th century, it was the largest college in the United States. In 1847, it was joined by another undergraduate school at Yale, the Sheffield Scientific School, which was absorbed into the college in 1956. These merged curricula became the basis of the modern-day liberal arts curriculum, which requires students to take courses in a broad range of subjects, including foreign language, composition, sciences, and quantitative reasoning, in addition to electing a departmental major in their sophomore year.

The most distinctive feature of undergraduate life is the school's system of residential colleges, established in 1932, and modeled after the constituent colleges of English universities. Undergraduates live in these colleges after their first year, when most live on the school's Old Campus. The total undergraduate term bill was $87,150 for the 2024–25 academic year, with a tuition bill of $67,250 and $19,900 for room and board.

== History ==
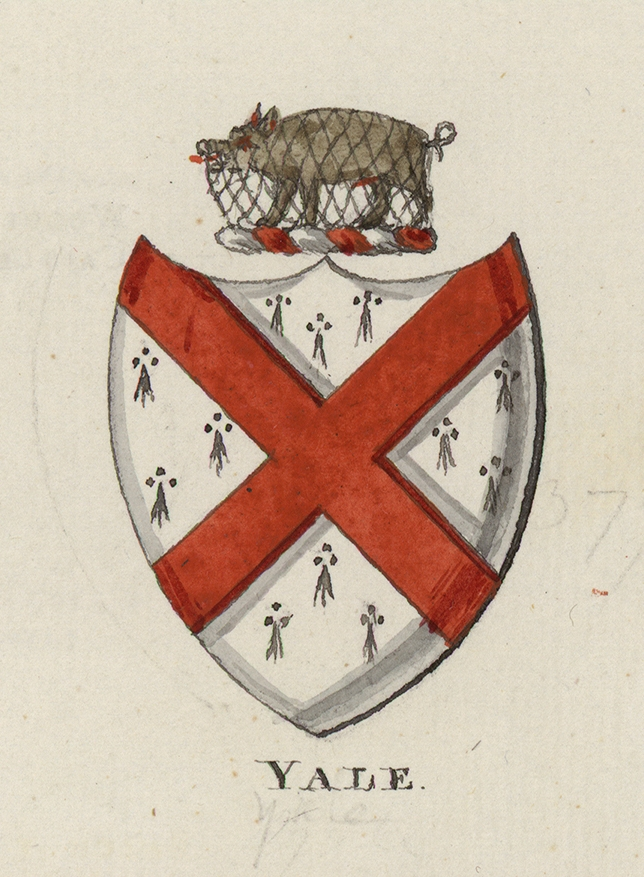
The coat of arms of the College is inspired by the coat of arms of Elihu Yale

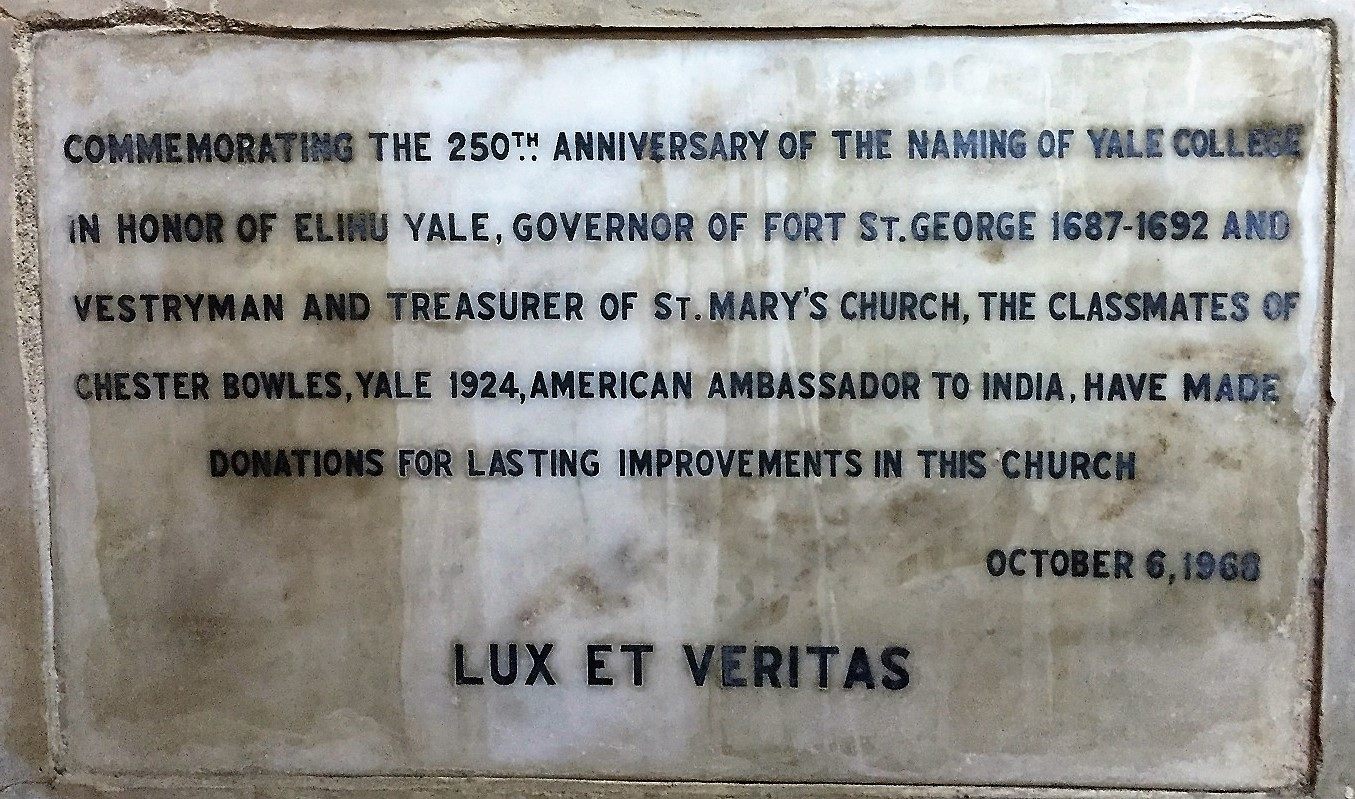
Elihu Yale Memorial, St. Mary's Church, Madras

The Collegiate School was founded in 1701 by a charter drawn by ten Congregationalist ministers led by James Pierpont and approved by the General Court of the Colony of Connecticut. Originally situated in Abraham Pierson's home in Killingworth, Connecticut, the college moved to Old Saybrook, Connecticut in 1707 after Pierson's death, when the first treasurer of Yale, Nathaniel Lynde, donated land and a building. In 1702, Nathaniel Chauncey became the first person to attain a degree, having it conferred solely by oral examination by Pierson and Noadiah Russell.

The college moved again to New Haven in 1716, and was renamed for Elihu Yale, an early benefactor, merchant, and philanthropist. Many of the early students were training to become ministers, and the original curriculum included only coursework in theology and sacred languages. Although early faculty, including Jonathan Edwards and Elisha Williams, maintained strict Congregational orthodoxy, by the time of the American Revolution subsequent rectors, especially Ezra Stiles, relaxed the curriculum to include humanities and limited natural science education.

Scientific courses introduced by chemist Benjamin Silliman in 1801, made the college an early hub of scientific education, a curriculum which was grafted into Yale's Sheffield Scientific School in 1847. As in many of Yale's sister institutions, debates about the expansiveness of the undergraduate curriculum were waged throughout the early 19th century, with statements like the Yale Report of 1828 re-asserting Yale's conservative theological heritage and faculty. Later in the century, William Graham Sumner, the first professor of sociology in the United States, introduced studies in the social sciences. These expanding fields of study were integrated with graduate schools of the university and amalgamated into a course of liberal arts education, which presaged the advent of divisional majors in the twentieth century.

The relaxation of curriculum came with expansion of the extracurriculum. Student literary societies emerged as early as 1750, singing groups and student publications in the early 1800s, fraternities and secret societies in the mid-nineteenth century, and intercollegiate athletics by the century's end. Participation and leadership in these groups was an important social signifier and a route to induction into prestigious senior societies. Thus extracurricular participation became central to student life and social advancement, an ethos that became a template for collegiate life across the United States.

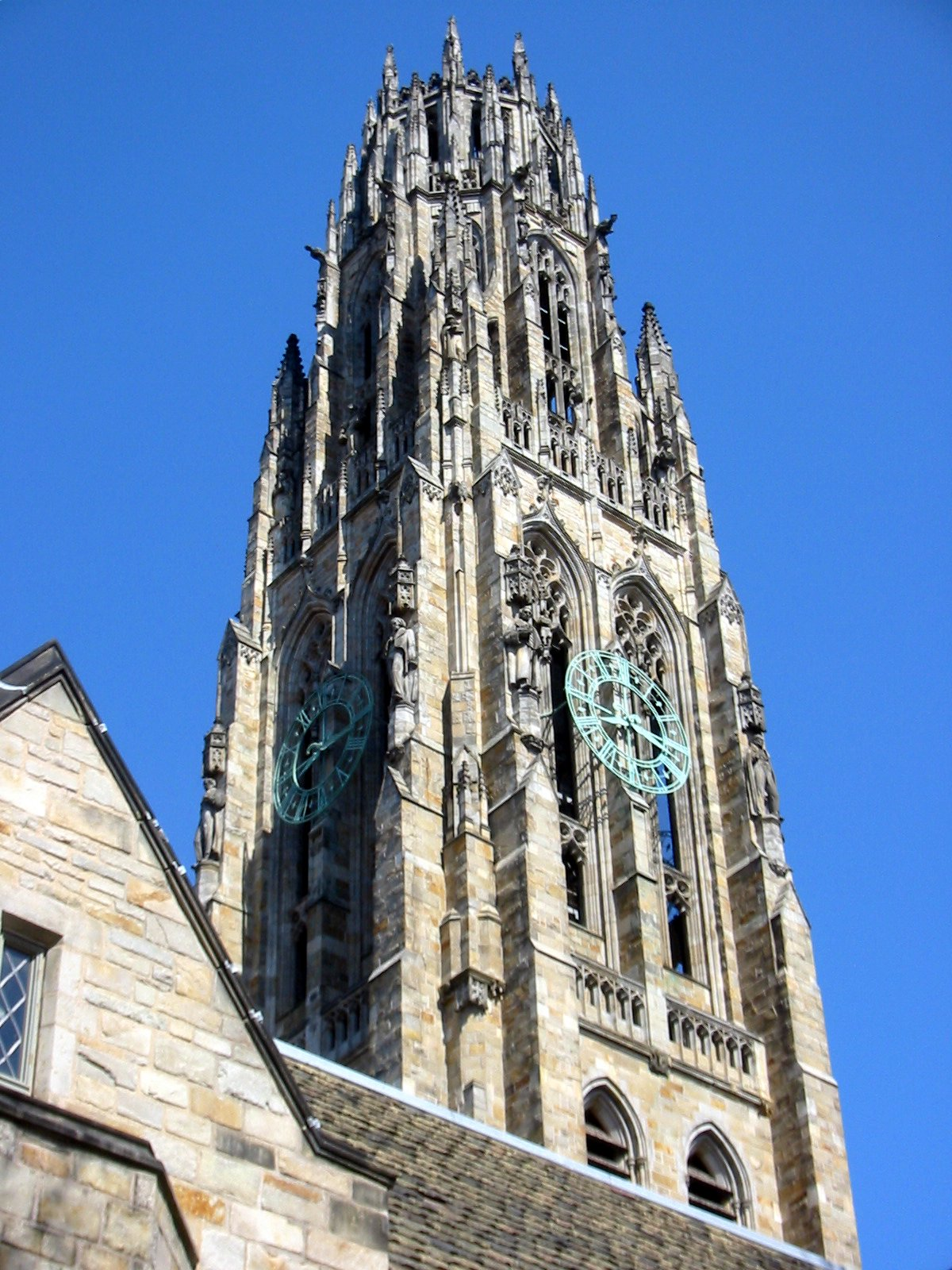
Harkness Tower at Yale

By 1870, Yale was the largest undergraduate institution in the country. The growth of the student body prompted major growth in the college's physical campus, the greatest expansion of which occurred in 1933, when a gift of Edward S. Harkness created and endowed eight residential colleges. Modeled after the college system of Oxford and Cambridge Universities, the colleges were intended to be the social and residential centers of undergraduate life while leaving academic programs under the oversight of university's departments. Two additional colleges were built by 1940, two more (Ezra Stiles College and Morse College) opened in 1962, and two more (Pauli Murray College and Benjamin Franklin College) in 2017.

=== Admission and exclusion ===
For most of its history, study at Yale was almost exclusively restricted to white Protestant men, often the children of alumni. Documented exceptions to this paradigm include Hawaiian native Henry ʻŌpūkahaʻia, who became a student of Yale President Timothy Dwight in 1809, and black abolitionist James W. C. Pennington, who was allowed to audit theology courses in 1837. Moses Simons, a descendant of a slave-holding South Carolinian family, has been suggested to be the first Jew to graduate from Yale. Though his maternal ancestry is disputed, he may have also been the first person of African-American descent to graduate from any American college. In 1854, Yung Wing graduated from the college and became the first student from China to graduate from an American university, and in 1857, Richard Henry Green became the first African-American man to receive a degree from the college. Until the rediscovery of Green's ethnic descent in 2014, physicist Edward Bouchet, who stayed at Yale to become the first African-American PhD recipient, was believed to also be the first African-American graduate of Yale College.

In the early 20th century, the student body was predominantly "old-stock, high-status Protestants, especially Episcopalians, Congregationalists, and Presbyterians"—a group later called WASPs. By the 1970s, it was much more diverse.

Enrollment at Yale only became competitive in the early 20th century, requiring the college to set up an admissions process. As late as the 1950s, tests and demographic questionnaires for admission to the college worked to exclude non-Christian men, especially Jews, as well as non-white men. By the mid-1960s, these processes were becoming more meritocratic, allowing for the recruitment of a racially, economically, and geographically diverse student body. This meritocratic transition encouraged the university to establish the first need-blind admissions policy in the United States. After several decades of debate about coeducation, Yale College admitted its first class of women in 1969. The regular decision acceptance rate for the class of 2030 was 2.9% with an overall rate of 4.2%, a decrease from the previous year's statistic of 3.65% and 4.59%, respectively.

In recent years, the college has focused on international recruitment, quadrupling the fraction of international students admitted between 1993 and 2013. The university reported that 756 international students (11% of the total undergraduate population) were enrolled in Fall 2024.

== Organization ==
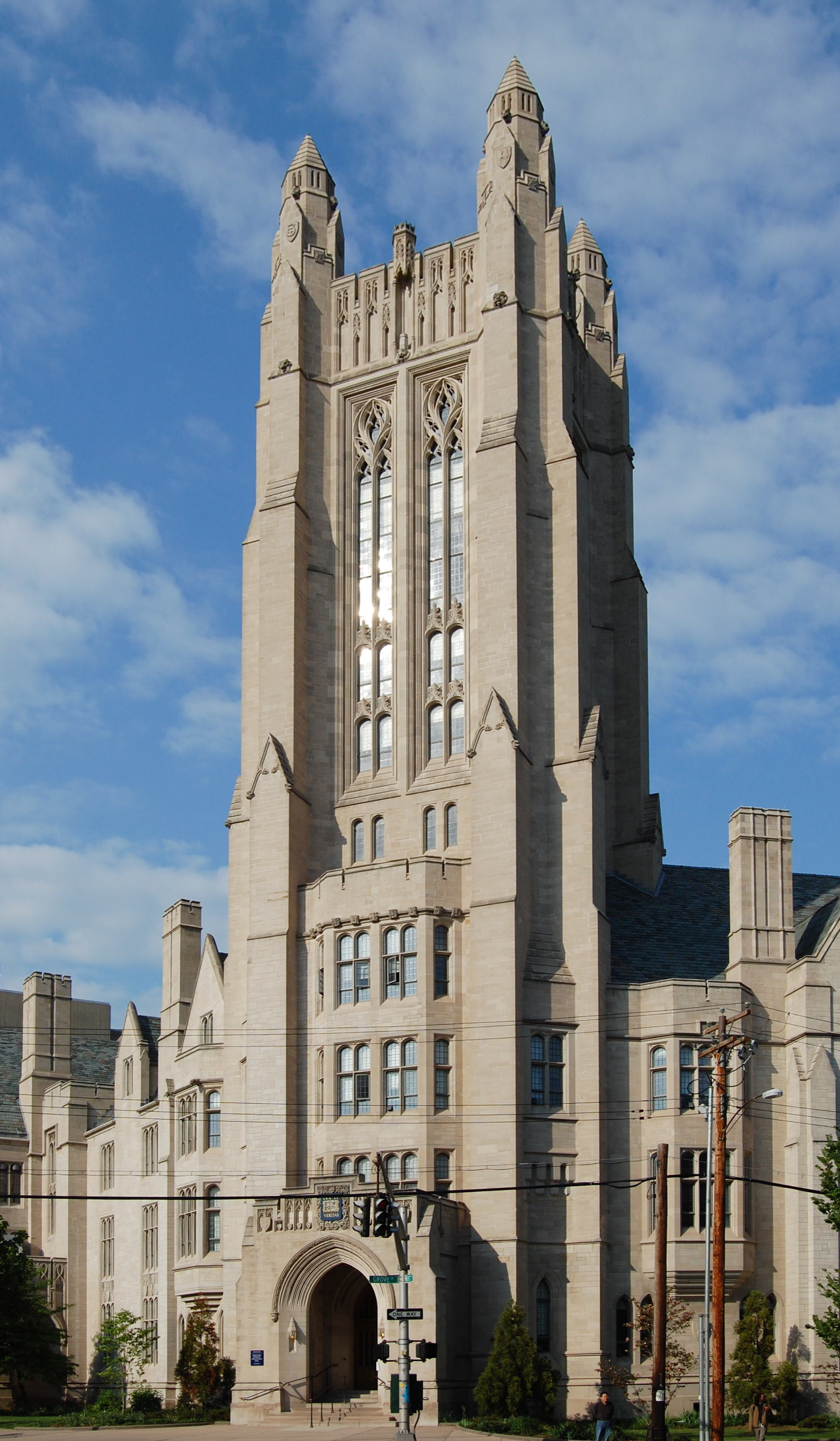
Sheffield–Sterling–Strathcona Hall, main administrative building of Yale College

Yale College is a constituent school of Yale University and contains a dependent system of residential colleges. Its executive officer is the Dean of Yale College, who is appointed to a five-year term by the Yale Corporation. The dean oversees undergraduate academic curriculum, extracurricular activities, and student discipline, but does not have direct control over the residential colleges. The position is currently held by Pericles Lewis, professor of comparative literature.

All of the college's faculty are members of the Yale Faculty of Arts and Sciences and are thereby jointly affiliated with the Graduate School of Arts and Sciences. Tenured members of the Faculty of Arts and Sciences constitute the Board of Permanent Officers, who govern the school's curriculum and programs. Most undergraduate courses and majors are offered under the purview of academic departments, divisions of the Faculty of Arts and Sciences which offer undergraduate and graduate curricula. In addition, the faculties of three Yale professional schools, the School of Art, School of Architecture and School of Forestry & Environmental Studies, also offer undergraduate programs.

Residential colleges, which are funded and controlled by the university, have separate administration and limited self-governance. The Heads of College (before 2016 called Masters), usually tenured faculty members, are appointed to renewable, five-year terms by the Yale Corporation to oversee the affairs of each college. Residential college deans, who are supervised by the Dean of Yale College, are in charge of undergraduate academic oversight. Each residential college is governed by its Head of College, Dean, and Fellows, and has a college council of students with limited jurisdiction over student affairs. Issues affecting multiple colleges are governed by the Council of the Heads of College, composed of the Heads of College of the fourteen colleges.

== Residential colleges ==
The most distinctive feature of Yale College undergraduate life is the residential college system. The system was established in 1933, through a gift by Yale graduate Edward S. Harkness, who admired the college systems at Oxford University and Cambridge University. Each college consists of dormitory buildings surrounding an enclosed courtyard, and features a dining hall, library, and student facilities ranging from printing presses to darkrooms. Each is led by a Head of College, a faculty member who serves as its chief administrator, and a Dean, who oversees student academic affairs. University faculty and distinguished affiliates are associated with the colleges as fellows. Unlike their English forerunners, the colleges do not administer academic degree programs or courses of study, but they do sponsor academic seminars that fall outside the normal departmental structure of the university, and the Heads of College host lectures and teas for the colleges that attract high-profile visitors.

Harkness' gift built and endowed eight colleges, completed from 1932 to 1934. Additional colleges were opened in 1935 (Timothy Dwight College), 1940 (Silliman College), 1962 (Morse College and Ezra Stiles College), and 2017 (Pauli Murray College and Benjamin Franklin College), bringing the present-day number to fourteen. The first ten colleges were designed in Collegiate Gothic and Georgian Revival styles; the two colleges built in the 1960s are Modernist reinventions of the college plan. The two most recent residential colleges, built in the Collegiate Gothic style near Science Hill, opened in 2017.

=== List of residential colleges ===
Residential colleges are named for important figures or places in university history or notable alumni; they are deliberately not named for benefactors.

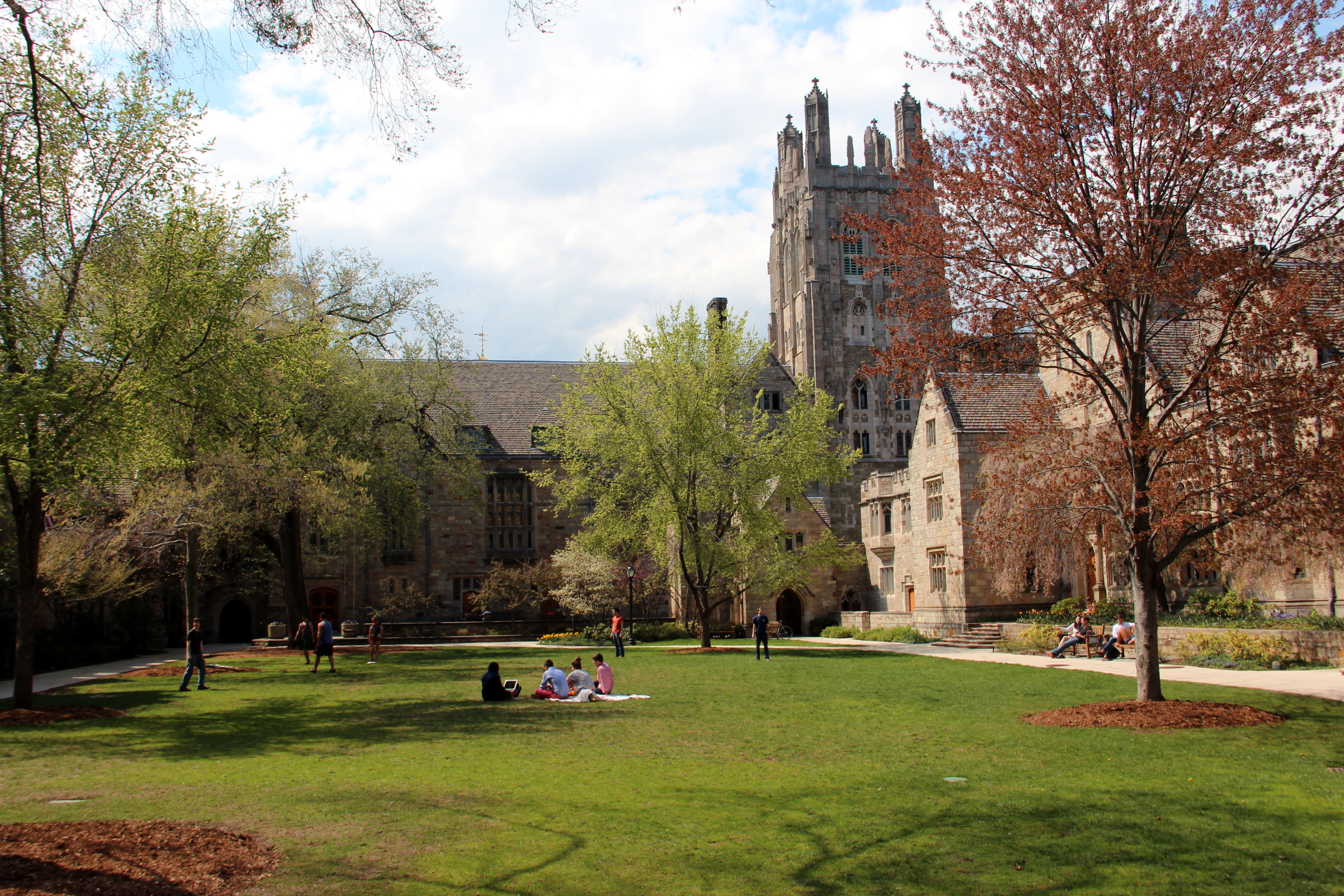
Branford College

1. Benjamin Franklin College – named for Founding Father Benjamin Franklin.
2. Berkeley College – named for George Berkeley (1685–1753), early benefactor of Yale.
3. Branford College – named for Branford, Connecticut, the town in which Yale was founded.
4. Davenport College – named for John Davenport, the founder of New Haven. Often called "D'port."
5. Ezra Stiles College – named for Ezra Stiles, a president of Yale. Designed by Eero Saarinen.
6. Jonathan Edwards College – named for theologian and Princeton University co-founder Jonathan Edwards. Usually called "J.E."
7. Grace Hopper College – named for Admiral Grace Murray Hopper, Yale Ph.D. and computer pioneer. Until 2017, this college was named for John C. Calhoun, Vice President of the United States.
8. Morse College – named for Samuel Morse, inventor of Morse Code. Also designed by Eero Saarinen.
9. Pauli Murray College – named for civil rights activist, legal scholar and religious pioneer Pauli Murray.
10. Pierson College – named for Yale's first rector, Abraham Pierson.
11. Saybrook College – named for Old Saybrook, Connecticut, where Yale was briefly located.
12. Silliman College – named for noted scientist and Yale professor Benjamin Silliman. About half of its structures were originally part of the Sheffield Scientific School.
13. Timothy Dwight College – named for the two Yale presidents of that name, Timothy Dwight IV and Timothy Dwight V. Usually called "T.D."
14. Trumbull College – named for Jonathan Trumbull, 18th-century governor of Connecticut.

== Student organizations ==
=== Singing groups ===
Yale College has been called "the epicenter of college singing," both for its long history of singing groups and its centrality in establishing collegiate a cappella in the United States. The earliest choral group, the Beethoven Society, dates to 1812 and emerged in the mid-nineteenth century as the Yale Glee Club. Although glee clubs around the country had spawned small collegiate ensembles since that time, the all-senior, all-male Whiffenpoofs, formed in 1909, are often considered to be the oldest collegiate a cappella society in the United States. Formalizing a style pioneered by black barbershop groups in New Haven, their repertoire was amplified by the founding of similar groups across the country. Coeducation in 1969 made possible all-women's groups and mixed groups. In all, there are now at least eighteen undergraduate a cappella groups in Yale College, ranging from a Slavic chorus to Christian a cappella.

=== Publications ===
Student publications at Yale date back as far as 1806, but the earliest still in print, the Yale Literary Magazine, was founded in 1836 and is believed to be the oldest surviving literary review in the United States. Undergraduate publications like the Yale Banner, a yearbook, and The Yale Record, a humor magazine, followed suit, often around the same time similar publications were established at Harvard and Princeton. The Yale Daily News, established in 1878, was a relative latecomer but became the flagship campus daily, and continues to publish during every weekday of the undergraduate academic term. These publications have been joined by many 20th-century debuts, including The Yale Herald and The New Journal.

=== Secret societies ===
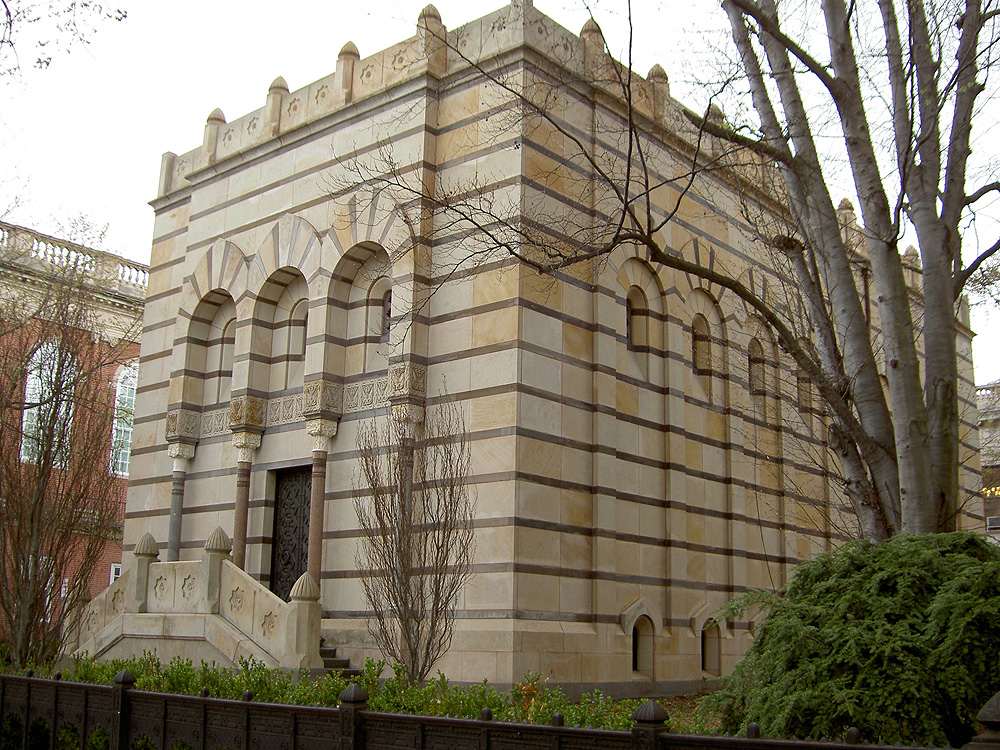
The Moorish "Tomb" of Scroll and Key, one of the college's richest senior societies

In 1832, a rift over Phi Beta Kappa inductions between the college's two debating societies, Linonia and Brothers in Unity, caused seniors to establish the first secret society at the university, Skull and Bones. Skull and Bones "tapped" select juniors for membership as seniors, a ritual later adopted by all undergraduate senior societies. Since then, senior societies have proliferated at Yale, with recent estimates of 41 existing societies and senior class membership ranging from ten to fifty percent of each class. Although once carefully guarded, the "secrecy" of these senior societies is dubious; their existence is widely known and membership rolls for most are published yearly. Ten present-day societies—Skull and Bones, Scroll and Key, Book and Snake, Wolf's Head, Elihu, Berzelius, St. Elmo, Manuscript, Shabtai, and Mace and Chain—have private buildings near campus; these are sometimes referred to as "landed" societies. Many other societies have a fixed on-campus meeting space where they meet twice a week. Some of the oldest society buildings are enclosed and windowless; members refer to them as "tombs."

Their activities have varied over time and across societies, but most societies meet for dinners, discussion, drinking, and long-form disclosure of members' life history. Despite a long history of social exclusion—of Jews and women in particular—many of these societies have prioritized membership diversity in the last several decades. The semi-secrecy and influential membership of Yale's older senior societies has attracted wide interest and scrutiny, particularly when both 2004 U.S. presidential candidates were members of Skull and Bones.

== In popular culture ==
- The anti-Tom novel Aunt Phillis's Cabin by Mary Henderson Eastman is partially set in Yale College in the 1850s.
- In the American TV series Gilmore Girls, Rory Gilmore attends Yale College, choosing it over Harvard.
