= Pauli Murray College =

Residential college at Yale University

- Residential college at Yale University
- Yale University
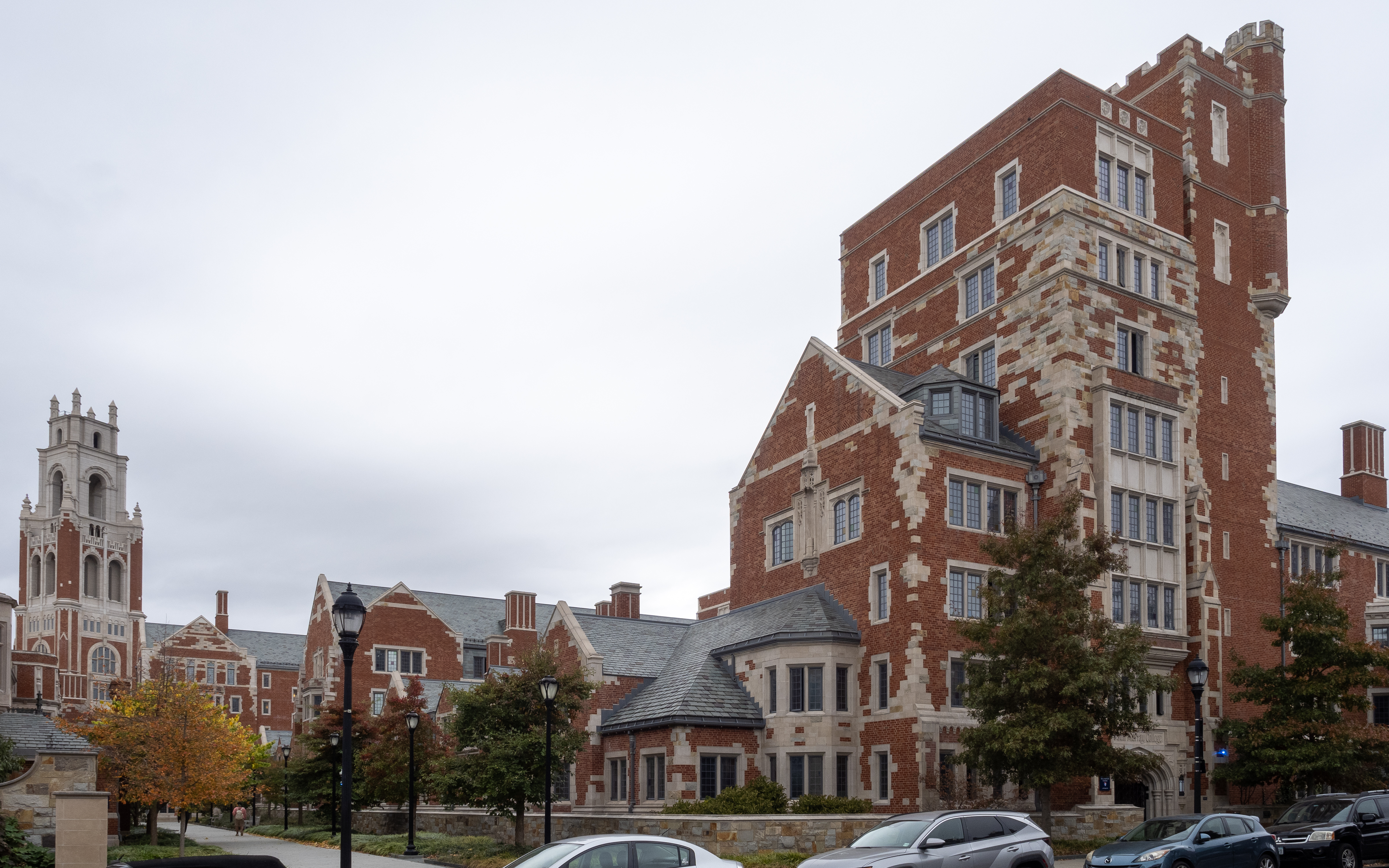

- Coat of arms of Pauli Murray College
- Location: 130 Prospect Street, New Haven, CT 06520
- Coordinates: 41.315508°N 72.925486°W
- Abbreviation: MY
- Established: 2017
- Named for: Pauli Murray
- Architect: Robert A.M. Stern Architects
- Architectural style: Collegiate Gothic
- Colors: Red, White, Blue
- Head: Tina Lu
- Dean: Aaron King
- Undergraduates: 452
- Mascot: Lemur (LiMur)
- Website: paulimurray.yalecollege.yale.edu

Pauli Murray College is one of fourteen residential colleges at Yale University in New Haven, Connecticut. Named after Pauli Murray, a civil rights activist, legal scholar, and 1965 graduate of Yale Law School, the college began full operations for students in the fall semester of 2017 along with its twin, Benjamin Franklin College. The two colleges were the first residential colleges built at Yale since Morse and Ezra Stiles colleges opened in 1962, increasing undergraduate enrollment by approximately 15 percent. Pauli Murray College was the first Yale residential college named after a woman and the first named after an African American.

Designed by Robert A.M. Stern Architects in the Collegiate Gothic style, the college houses 452 students and shares a 6.2-acre (2.5 ha) site with Benjamin Franklin College along Prospect Street. The project received LEED Gold certification and has won multiple architectural awards including the Stanford White Award and the AIA Housing Award.

== History ==
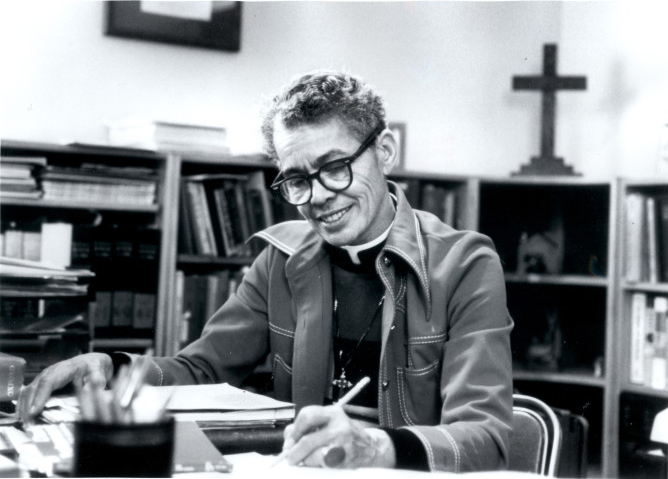
Pauli Murray, the namesake of the college

In 2008, Yale University President Rick Levin announced that the university would expand its enrollment by opening two new residential colleges for a total of fourteen. Architectural models were unveiled by Robert A.M. Stern Architects in May 2009. The project was funded entirely by private donations, including a $250 million gift from Charles B. Johnson (Yale Class of 1954), the largest single donation in Yale's history at the time. Construction began in fall 2014, with an official groundbreaking in April 2015. The first students moved in on August 25, 2017, and a formal dedication ceremony was held in October 2017, attended by more than 275 people including over 30 members of Pauli Murray's family.

=== Naming ===
In April 2016, the university announced that the colleges would be named after Pauli Murray and Benjamin Franklin. Yale President Peter Salovey stated: "Pauli Murray represents the best of Yale: a pre-eminent intellectual inspired to lead and prepared to serve her community and her country."

Murray was the first African American to receive a Doctor of Juridical Science (J.S.D.) degree from Yale Law School in 1965, co-founded the National Organization for Women, and in 1977 became the first African American woman ordained as an Episcopal priest. The naming made Pauli Murray College the first Yale residential college named after a woman and the first named after an African American.

The naming announcement was part of a broader set of decisions responding to campus activism around race and inclusion. The same announcement retained the name of Calhoun College (named for John C. Calhoun), though that decision was reversed in February 2017 when Calhoun College was renamed Grace Hopper College.

== Architecture and design ==
Pauli Murray College was designed by Robert A.M. Stern, then dean of the Yale School of Architecture, along with Graham S. Wyatt, Melissa DelVecchio, and Jennifer L. Stone of Robert A.M. Stern Architects. The landscape was designed by OLIN, and the college was built by Dimeo Construction Company.

The design is in the Collegiate Gothic style, continuing the tradition established by architect James Gamble Rogers, who designed eight of Yale's original ten residential colleges in the 1930s. The total construction cost for both colleges was approximately $500 million, funded entirely by private donations. The facades are clad in hand-set brick in a tricolor blend, accented by buff Indiana limestone and Weymouth granite.

Pauli Murray College is the northern of the two colleges, located on a triangular site bounded by Prospect Street, Sachem Street, and the Farmington Canal Heritage Trail. The college features multiple courtyards linked by arched passageways, with building heights rising from north to south to allow maximum sunlight. Prospect Walk, a landscaped pedestrian way, bisects the site and provides east-west circulation connecting Yale's Central Campus with the surrounding city.

=== Edward P. Bass Tower ===
The Edward P. Bass Tower rises 192 feet (59 m) between the two colleges, visually connecting Yale's Central Campus with Science Hill to the north. The tower's square mass recalls towers in the Old Campus colleges but is enlivened by limestone quoining, projecting bays, and checkered flushwork masonry.

=== Stone carvings ===
More than 700 pieces of original hand-carved stone ornament are distributed between the two colleges, designed by former Yale faculty member Patrick Pinnell and executed by Traditional Cut Stone. Grotesques along Pauli Murray College depict the evolution of the written word from an engraved stone tablet to a smartphone. A staircase in one of the college's courtyards features an ornament scheme based on DNA.

=== Sustainability ===
Pauli Murray and Benjamin Franklin colleges achieved LEED Gold certification in October 2020. Forty-eight underground closed-loop ground-source heat pumps offset approximately 50 percent of cooling needs and 30 percent of heating needs, and the colleges use 35 percent less energy on average than Yale's other residential colleges. Wood flooring in the dining rooms, libraries, and common rooms was sourced from Yale Forests, and 94 percent of construction debris was recycled.

== Facilities ==
The college includes a 300-seat dining hall, a library, a common room, and a Head of College house. A shared lower level between the two colleges contains a basketball court, dance theater, and fitness center.

=== Lighten Theater ===
Lighten Theater is an intimate courtyard-style performance space within the college, with adjustable seating for approximately 71 people and a 20-by-20-foot (6.1 m × 6.1 m) main performance area.

Additional facilities include four soundproof music practice rooms, a pottery studio, a recording studio, an art studio, a student kitchen, and a bike shop.

== Mickalene Thomas mural ==
In March 2023, a monumental mosaic mural by artist Mickalene Thomas (Yale School of Art MFA 2002) was unveiled in the college's dining hall. Spanning over 120 feet (37 m) in length, the work depicts a black-and-white portrait of a young Pauli Murray gazing toward blue sky, interspersed with pink and green-hued flowers and abstract shapes, composed of thousands of enamel tiles across 75 panels. Thomas traveled to Murray's childhood home in Durham, North Carolina, to photograph the local flora that is incorporated into the design. The mural took approximately six years to plan, design, and construct.

== Awards ==
- 2017 Stanford White Award, Institute of Classical Architecture and Art
- 2018 Palladio Award, Traditional Building
- 2018 AIA Housing Award, American Institute of Architects
- 2018 ENR Best Higher Education/Research Award, Engineering News-Record
- SCUP Honor Award for Excellence in Architecture, Society for College and University Planning

== Heraldry ==
The college coat of arms features a red, white, and blue palette referencing the American flag. The three eight-pointed mullets (stars) represent spur rowels historically associated with Scottish Murray families and symbolize Murray's efforts to catalyze transformations in race relations, women's rights, and gender identity. A blue and white circle is derived from a mark that appeared on Pauli Murray's personal stationery.

== Student life ==
Pauli Murray College houses approximately 452 students, who are known as "LiMurs" after the college mascot, the ring-tailed lemur, chosen because "you can't say 'Pauli Murray' without saying the word 'lemur'."

College traditions include an annual birthday celebration for Pauli Murray on November 20, featuring cupcakes and poetry readings, and November reading groups in which students discuss Murray's writings.

The Pauli Murray College Council (MYCC) is the elected student governing body. Students participate in intramural sports as part of the annual Tyng Cup competition, which has been awarded since 1933. Pauli Murray College won the Tyng Cup in 2022, 2023, and 2024, a three-peat that was especially notable for one of Yale's newest colleges.

== Leadership ==
Heads of college
#	Name	Term
1	Tina Lu, Colonel John Trumbull Professor of East Asian Languages and Civilizations	2016–present

Tina Lu was appointed as the inaugural head of college in July 2016. She holds a B.A. summa cum laude from Harvard College and a Ph.D. in comparative literature from Harvard University.

Deans
#	Name	Term
1	Alexander Rosas	2016–2023
2	Aaron King	2023–present

Alexander Rosas, the former associate director of graduate programs at Yale Law School, served as the college's first dean from 2016 until his resignation following the 2022–2023 academic year. Aaron King, whose scholarly work focuses on identity development and intergroup dialogue, became the current dean in 2023.

== See also ==
- Benjamin Franklin College
- Pauli Murray
- Residential colleges of Yale University
