= Silliman College =

Residential college at Yale University

- Residential college at Yale University
- Yale University
- Coat of arms of Silliman College
- Location: 505 College Street
- Coordinates: 41.31105°N 72.92544°W
- Nickname: Sillimanders
- Motto: Nutrisco et extinguo (Latin)
- Motto in English: I nourish and I extinguish
- Established: 1940
- Named for: Benjamin Silliman
- Colors: Red, white, green, gold
- Sister college: Dudley House, Pforzheimer House
- Head: Arielle Baskin-Sommers
- Dean: Matthew Newman
- Mascot: Salamander
- Website: www.yale.edu/silliman

Map
- Location within Connecticut

Silliman College is a residential college at Yale University in New Haven, Connecticut. The college is named for Benjamin Silliman, the first science professor at Yale. It opened in September 1940 as the last of the original ten residential colleges, and contains buildings constructed as early as 1901.

Silliman is Yale's largest residential college by its footprint, occupying most of a city block. Due to its size, the college is able to house its first-year students in the college instead of on Yale's Old Campus. The college's architecture is varied: though architect Otto Eggers completed most of the college with Georgian buildings, the college also incorporates two early-20th century buildings in the French Renaissance and Gothic Revival styles.

The college has links to Harvard's Pforzheimer House and Dudley House, as well as Trinity College, Cambridge and Brasenose College, Oxford. Its rival college at Yale is Timothy Dwight College, located directly across Temple Street.

== History ==
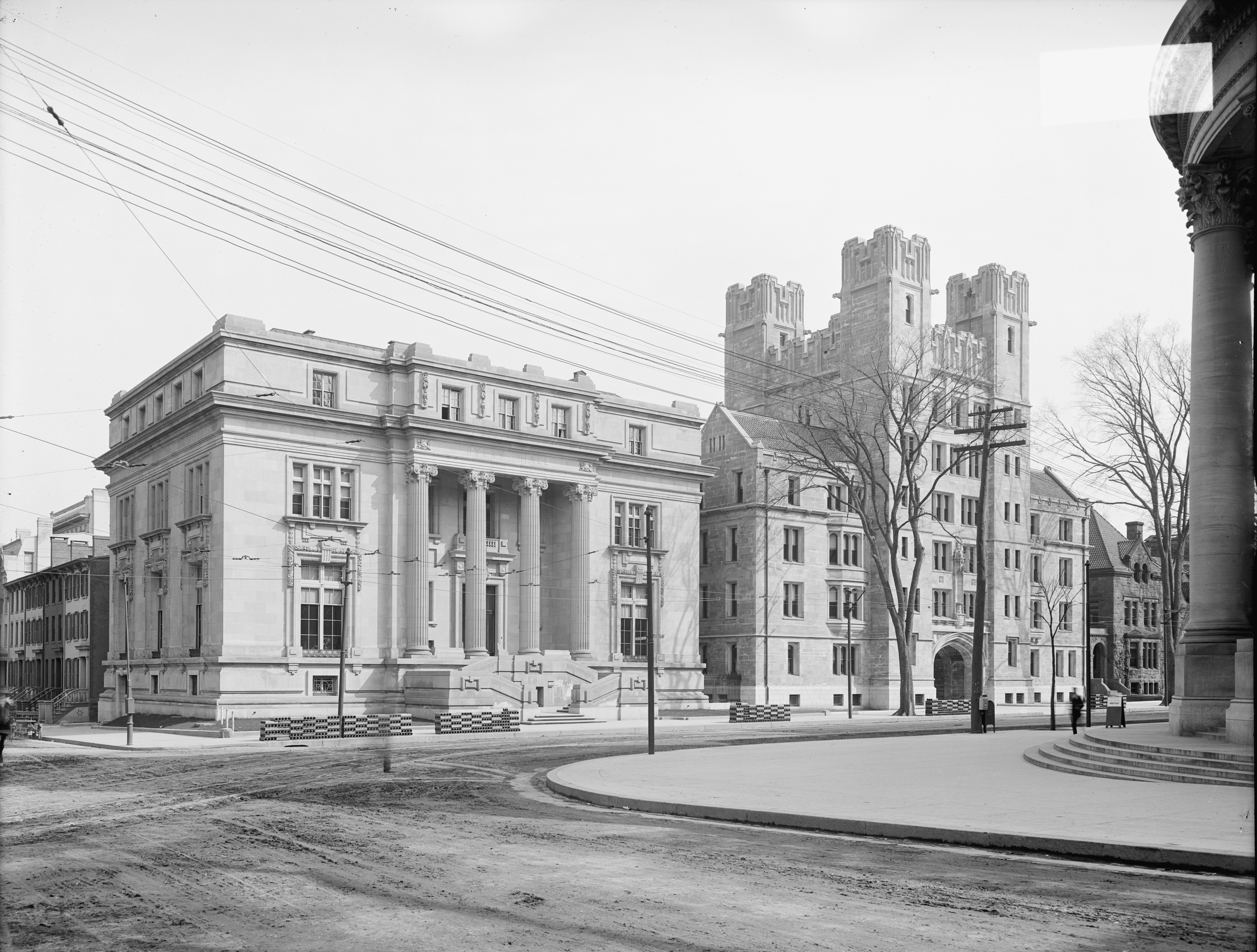
Byers Hall and Vanderbilt Hall, then part of the Sheffield Scientific School, now Silliman's main facade.

Silliman College is located on the lands of the Quinnipiac people. The oldest known non-Indigenous settlement at the college's current site was the farm of Robert Newman, whose barn hosted the meeting that incorporated the Colony of New Haven in 1639. The tract later became one of the blocks of New Haven's original nine-square city plan. Yale's first buildings on the site were for the Sheffield Scientific School. Byers Hall, a three-story building of Indiana limestone, was built in 1903 and designed by Hiss and Weekes architects in the modified French Renaissance Style. The Vanderbilt-Sheffield dormitory, a five-story building of the same material, was built between 1903 and 1906 by architect Charles C. Haight in the Gothic Revival style.

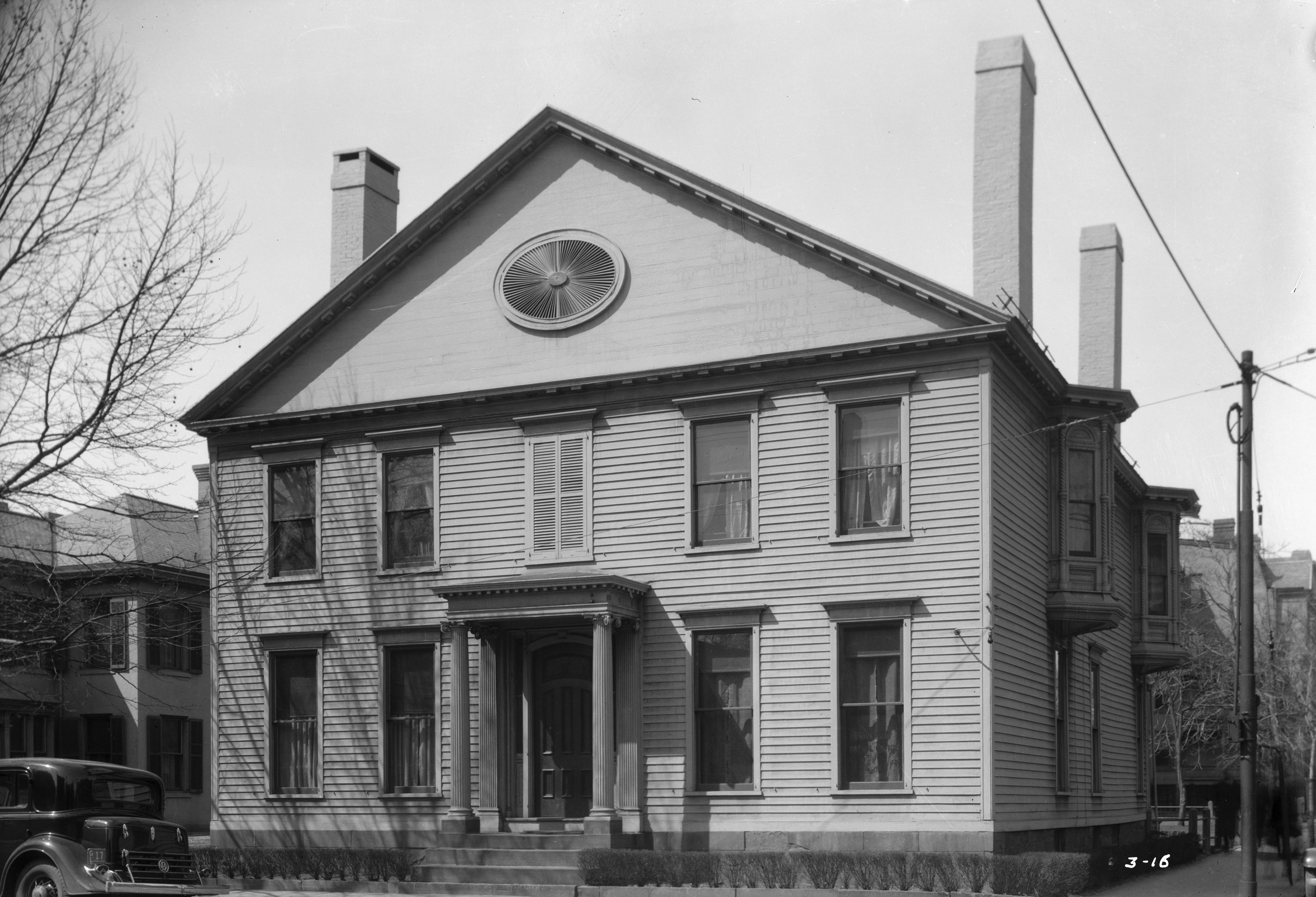
The Noah Webster House, on the corner of Grove St and Temple St, before its removal

In 1936, the university demolished the block of university buildings and houses that stood at the site, retaining only Van-Sheff, Byers Hall, and the adjacent St. Anthony Hall society building. The New Haven home of Noah Webster, occupied by its namesake from 1822 to 1843, was one of the structures scheduled for demolition. During ensuing controversy over the home's preservation, Henry Ford purchased the building and had it disassembled and re-erected at Greenfield Village in Dearborn, Michigan. A plaque now marks the site of the Webster House on the college's northeast corner.

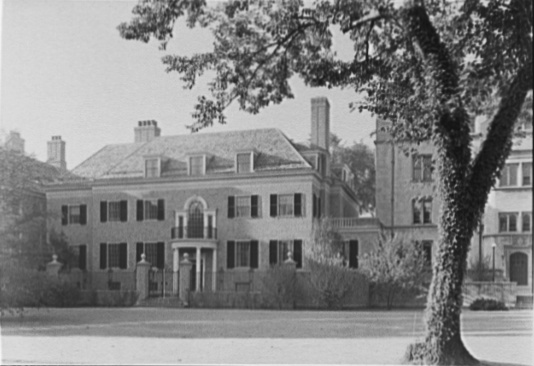
House of the Silliman Master, a Georgian Revival design by Otto Eggers

The "Quadrangle Plan," primarily funded by Edward Harkness, opened nine residential colleges for Yale between 1933 and 1934. Eight colleges were intended for Yale College, and two further for the Scientific School, one of which would be funded by Frederick W. Vanderbilt. This tenth college was planned by 1931, when Charles Hyde Warren was appointed as a college master, and named for Benjamin Silliman in 1933. Warren, also Sterling Professor of Geology and Dean of the Sheffield Scientific School, wrote a biography of Silliman but only retained his appointment until 1938, two years before the college's opening. Otto Eggers of Eggers & Higgins, previously a draftsman for John Russell Pope's buildings at Yale, was selected as the college's architect. Eggers' design preserved Van Sheff, reconstructed the interior of Byers Hall, and created a quadrangle of Georgian buildings to complete the college and harmonize it with the adjacent Timothy Dwight College, established six years earlier.

When the college opened in 1940, philosopher F. S. C. Northrop was appointed its master.

Under the Yale College policy that let incoming students express a residential college preference, Silliman developed a reputation for attracting engineers until the policy ended with the class of 1958.

== Shield and mascot ==
Silliman College's shield has a white background, three curving red lines emerging from near the bottom of the shield (representing salamander tails), and a green crossing bar containing three acorns. In heraldic terms, the shield is described as "Arms: Argent, three piles wavy gules, on a fess vert three acorns or." The colors represent the four ancient elements: red for fire, white for air and water, and green for earth. The acorns are an element taken from the family arms of Frederick Vanderbilt, 1876, who funded the college's construction.

The college's mascot is the salamander. Students in the college refer to themselves as Sillimanders.

== Facilities ==
The college courtyard, which covers almost an entire city block, is the largest enclosed courtyard at Yale and is one of the glories of the old college. Students can be seen playing various sports or lounging in the sun. Because of the size of the courtyard, sports such as spikeball, wiffle ball, football, and frisbee are often enjoyed.

Special facilities within Silliman include Yale's only undergraduate art gallery, called Maya's Room (named for Maya Tanaka Hanway, '83), a big-screen movie theater (Silliflicks), a dance studio, a half-court basketball facility called the Sillidome, computing facilities, a student kitchen, multiple music practice rooms, and a state-of-the-art sound recording studio. The college's library, located in the third floor of Byers Hall, is commonly referred to as the Sillibrary. The Buttery, a student-run eatery in the basement that serves greasy goodness on weekday nights, is designed in the style of the 1950s and its surrounding area includes games such as ping pong, air hockey, and pool

== College administrators and student representatives ==
The Head of College for Silliman is Arielle Baskin-Sommers, an associate professor of psychology and of psychiatry. She was appointed to her current role in March 2023, succeeding the previous Head of college Laurie R. Santos.

The current Residential College Dean of Silliman is Matthew Newman. In his capacity as dean, Newman is tasked with advising Silliman students based upon their individual circumstances, both academically and holistically.

The Silliman Activities and Administrative Committee (SAAC) collaborates with the Silliman Head of college on arranging Silliman social events and community service projects. The SAAC also serves as a forum for discussion of Silliman issues for college students. The SAAC president for the 2025–2026 academic year is Emma Popowitz whereas the SAAC vice president is Steven Rourick.

== Renovations ==
In August 2007, after three years of on-and-off renovations, students moved back into Silliman College. Students now enjoy a reconfigured dining hall and servery, a stadium-seating movie theater, and a large student activities space that includes a new art gallery, dance studio, gym, basketball court, weight room, buttery, game room, and television entertainment space. The Silliman College courtyard was also restored to its former glory, with new patio spaces, benches, and grass. The renovation cost some $100 million, by far the most spent on any residential college renovation at Yale.

Because of the size of Silliman College, the renovation work on the college was completed in several phases instead of the 15-month renovation completed on other colleges:

- In the summer of 2004, the roof and windows were replaced on the brick section of the college. Extra dormers were also added to the roofs so that student rooms could later be installed in the former attic spaces.
- In the summer of 2005, the Silliman Tower underwent a complete interior renovation.
- The entire college was shut down during the 2006–2007 school year for the rest of the renovation. All students from the college moved into either Swing Space (a new dormitory built especially to house students during college renovations), the Elm Street Annex or into independent off-campus housing until the renovations were completed.
- In 2017, a coffee shop, The Acorn, was added into the fourth floor of Byers Hall.

== Activities and traditions ==
=== Intramural sports ===
Silliman College has won the Tyng Cup (awarded for the best intramural record of Yale's 14 residential colleges) eight times, in 1941, 1943, 1968, 1969, 1972, 2006, 2007, and 2008.

== Silliman fame ==
Silliman gained fame when the popular movie Mona Lisa Smile featuring Julia Roberts, Julia Stiles and Kirsten Dunst, was partly filmed in the Silliman College courtyard and common room. The Grove Street facade of Silliman was used to represent Harvard University, and the Wall Street Gate and the common room were used to represent Wellesley College.

== Notable alumni ==
- George Roy Hill (‘43) – movie director
- Renée Richards (‘54) – transgender tennis player
- Jim Jeffords (‘56) – Independent U.S. senator from Vermont
- Wendell Mottley (‘64) – Olympic silver medalist, minister of finance of Trinidad and Tobago
- Strobe Talbott (‘68) – Brookings Institution president, former Time correspondent
- Daniel Yergin (‘68) – Pulitzer Prize-winning author and energy consultant
- Nathan Hecht (‘71) – Chief Justice of the Texas Supreme Court
- John Guernsey (‘75) – Bishop in the Anglican Church in North America
- Stone Phillips (‘77) – newscaster
- Evan Wolfson (‘78) – activist
- Anthony A. Williams (‘79) – the mayor of the District of Columbia from 1999 to 2007
- David Hyde Pierce (‘81) – actor, best known for playing the role of Niles Crane on "Fraiser"
- Neal Wolin (‘83) – Deputy Secretary of the U.S. Treasury
- Julie Otsuka (‘84) – author of "When the Emperor was Divine" and "The Buddha in the Attic"
- Elizabeth Wein (‘86) – author of Code Name Verity and Rose Under Fire
- Elizabeth Kostova (‘88) – author
- Nerissa Nields (‘89) – member of the band The Nields
- Ben Greenman (‘90) – author and journalist
- Joshua Foer (‘04) – author of "Moonwalking with Einstein"
- Kenneth Rogoff ('75) - Harvard economist and chess Grandmaster
- Jim Ryan ('88) - 9th President of the University of Virginia
