= Dudley Community =

Harvard College House serving nonresident undergraduates

- Nonresidential House
- Harvard University
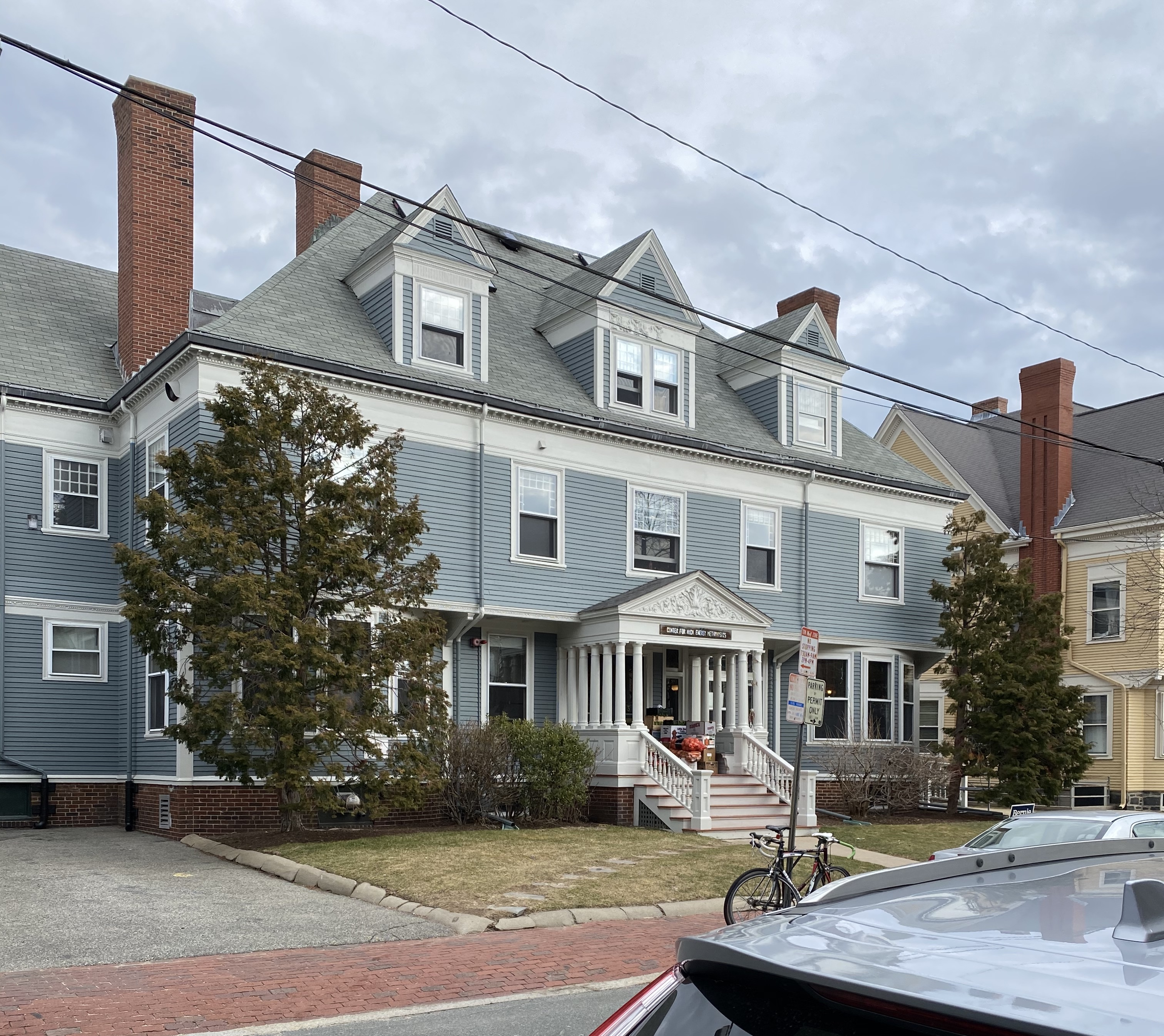
- Dudley Co-op

- Shield
- Location: 10 DeWolfe Street, Cambridge MA
- Established: 1935
- Named for: Thomas Dudley
- Sister college: Silliman College
- Dean: Laura Chivers
- HoCo chairs: David Sabot
- Website: dudley.harvard.edu

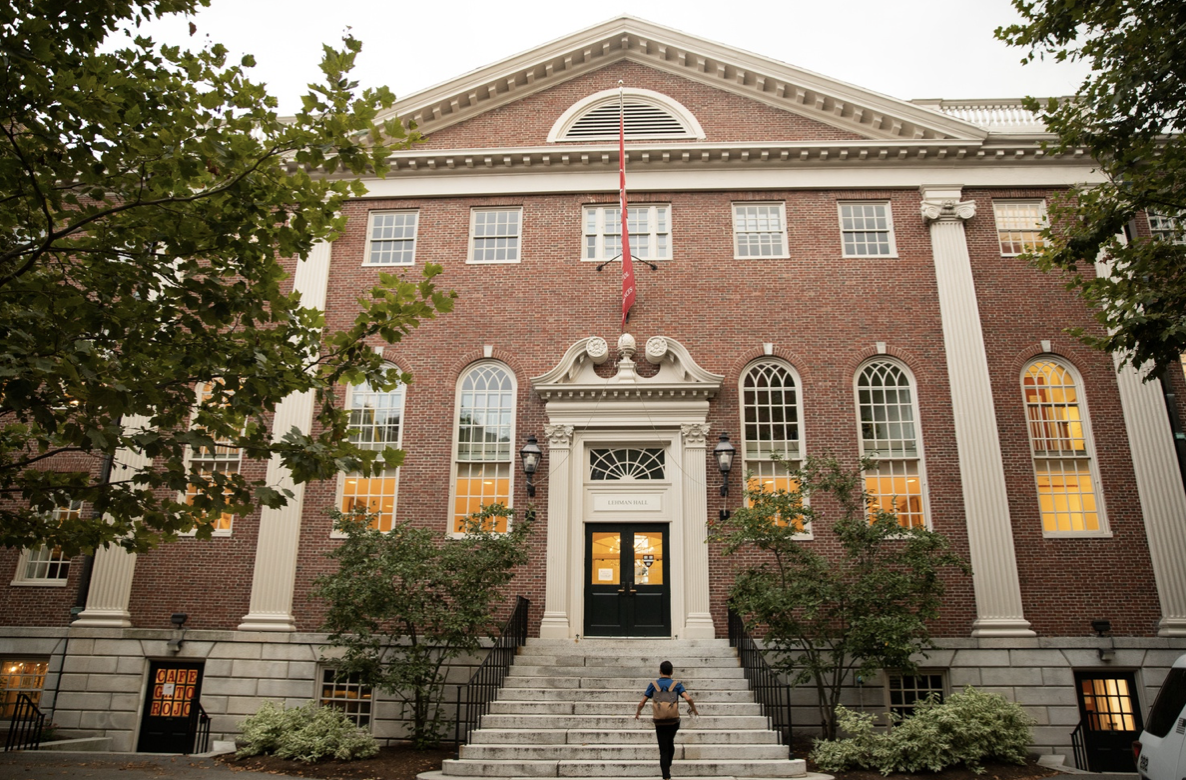
Lehman Hall

Dudley Community (formerly called Dudley House) is an alternative to Harvard College's 12 Houses. The Dudley Community serves nonresident undergraduate students, visiting undergraduate students, and undergraduates living in the Dudley Co-op. In 2019, the Dudley Community was formed, reflecting the administrative split between the undergraduate and graduate programs that were under Dudley House since 1991. Affiliated undergraduates have access to Dudley Community advisers, programs, intramural athletics, and organized social events. Dudley Community administrative offices are currently housed in two suites in 10 DeWolfe St in Cambridge after moving from Lehman Hall. Lehman Hall (formerly called Dudley House) now houses the student center for the Harvard Graduate School of Arts and Science.

== History ==
A decentralized commuter center was established in 1935 called Dudley Hall, named after the former Governor of Massachusetts Bay Colony Thomas Dudley. Coinciding with the founding of the Dudley Co-operative Society (Dudley Co-op)—Harvard's off-campus cooperative housing dormitory—it was renamed Dudley House and officially became part of the Harvard House system in 1958. It moved from Dunster Street to the Ambassador Hotel on Cambridge Street in 1963. Dudley House consolidated operations and moved to Lehman Hall in the southwest corner of Harvard Yard in 1967. In Fall 2019, the newly renamed Dudley Community moved to the 2nd Floor of 10 DeWolfe St.

In 1961, the Dudley House dining hall was the first at Harvard to go coeducational, which was an experiment that paved the way for the university's eventual merger with Radcliffe College.

== Lehman Hall ==
Lehman Hall is a Georgian-revival building by Charles Coolidge completed in 1925 as part of Harvard President Abbott Lawrence Lowell's program to "cloister" Harvard Yard. The building occupies the site on which the second, third, and fourth meetinghouses (1650, 1706, 1752) of The First Parish in Cambridge had been built. The site became Harvard property in 1833. Named for donor Arthur Lehman (1873–1936) and his wife Adele, its exterior "is a modified example of the early New England counting house."

In keeping with its original function as the home of Harvard's Bursar's Office – for part of which time it was known as "The Counting House" – its "heroic parade of pilasters, a bit overblown admittedly, [are] doubtless intended to mark the principal frontispiece, as Lehman is, of Yard to [Harvard] Square" (as Shand-Tucci put it). Its "main chamber reaches practically the entire height of the building, is finished in delicately modeled cream plaster ... an extraordinarily light, cheerily simple room. A balcony reaches about part of its upper circumference." Bainbridge Bunting wrote that its "public function is announced by an architectural frontispiece of giant pilasters and arched windows repeated on both major elevations. The building's mass also is sufficient to announce its official role and to define the triangular open space on its east side, although the pilasters are out of scale with other buildings in the Yard." The plaza immediately in front of its Yard-facing elevation once had a sculpture by Henry Moore.
