= Residential colleges of Yale University =

Undergraduate housing system at Yale University

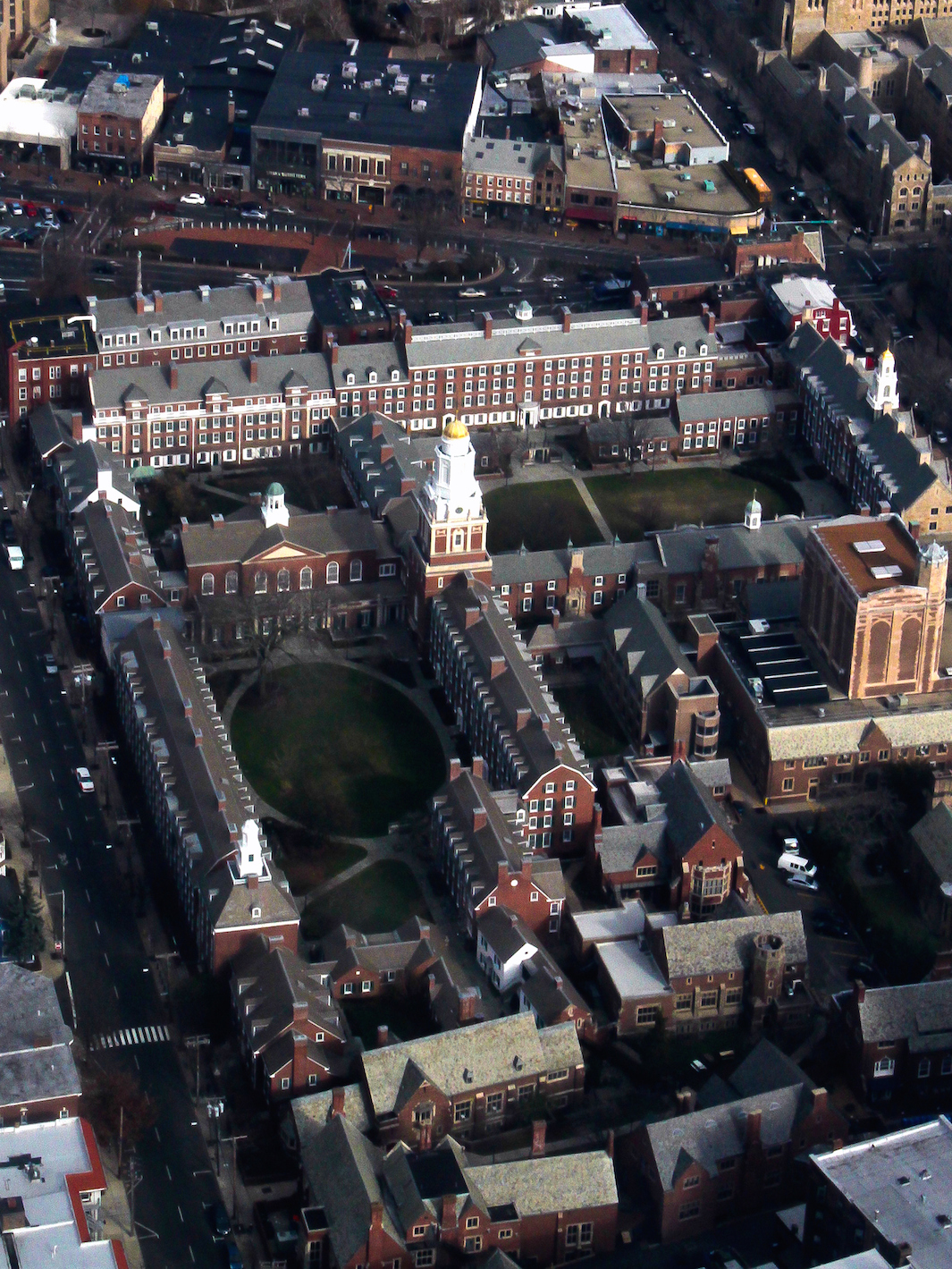
The campuses of Davenport College (above) and Pierson College (below), Yale's two Georgian Revival colleges

Yale University has a system of fourteen residential colleges with which all Yale undergraduate students and many faculty are affiliated. Inaugurated in 1933, the college system is considered the defining feature of undergraduate life at Yale College, and the residential colleges serve as the residence halls and social hubs for most undergraduates. Construction and programming for eight of the original ten colleges were funded by educational philanthropist Edward S. Harkness. Yale was, along with Harvard, one of the first universities in the United States to establish a residential college system.

Though their organizational and architectural features are modeled after the autonomous, constituent colleges of the universities of Oxford and Cambridge, they are dependent colleges of the university with limited self-governance, similar to most colleges of Durham. Each college is led by a Head of College (formerly known as a Master) who is usually a tenured professor, and a Dean in charge of student affairs and residential life. University faculty and administrators are affiliated with the colleges as fellows, and some live or keep offices in the college along with the Dean and Head.

All fourteen colleges are built in an enclosing configuration around a central courtyard; all but two employ revivalist architectural styles popularized at Yale by James Gamble Rogers. Each has a dining hall, library, recreational facilities, a head of college house, apartments for resident fellows and the college dean, and 250 to 400 student rooms, with most arranged in suites. Most reside in the colleges after their first year, which they spend on the university's Old Campus. In addition to sharing common residence and dining facilities, students plan events, lectures, and social activities within their college, and compete against other colleges in a yearlong intramural sports championship.

In the fall of 2017, Yale opened two new residential colleges, Benjamin Franklin College and Pauli Murray College, bringing the total to 14.

== History ==
=== Origin (1925–1933) ===
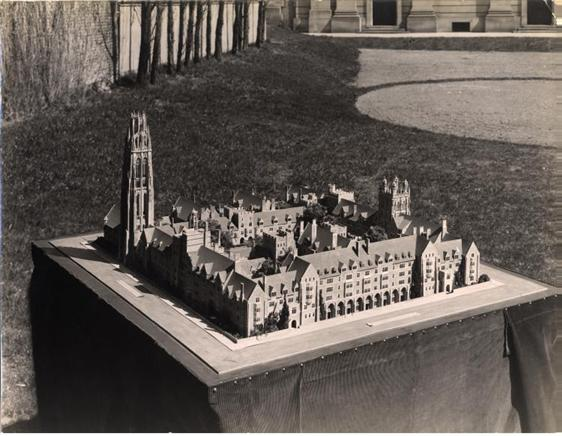
The Memorial Quadrangle, completed in 1920, was the colleges' residential template.

As undergraduate enrollment in Yale College surged in the early 20th century, alumni and administrators began to express concern that the college had lost its social cohesion and lacked residential facilities sufficient for its size. This alienation and overcrowding, along with the growth of off-campus fraternities and society residences and a desire to further integrate the undergraduate populations of the Yale College and the Sheffield Scientific School, prompted the Yale Corporation to solicit funds for new residential buildings from Edward Harkness, a Yale alumnus with major holdings in Standard Oil. Anna Harkness, Edward's mother, gave money for the Memorial Quadrangle and a few other dormitories, but growth in enrollment still outpaced new residential space.

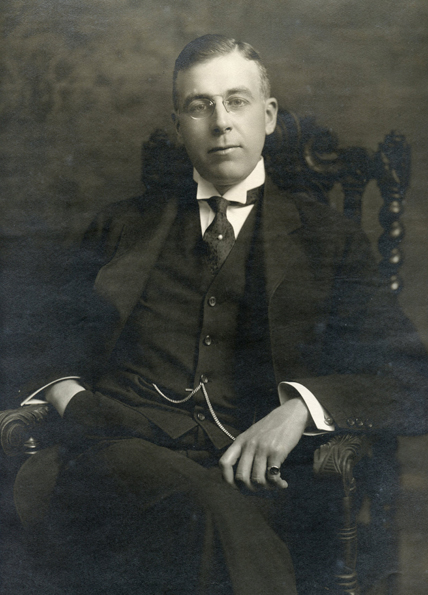
Edward Harkness, who funded the construction of eight colleges in 1930

In 1925, Yale President James Rowland Angell proposed a "Quadrangle Plan" to the Yale Corporation, to be modeled after the colleges at Oxford and Cambridge. Harkness admired the Oxbridge colleges as models of academic community and in 1926 offered $12 million to fund the plan. When the Yale Corporation deliberated for two further years and eventually suggested a modest housing plan for freshmen alone, Harkness instead seeded the house system at Harvard College.

Yale provost Charles Seymour approached Harkness about the Quadrangle Plan again in 1930, and Harkness agreed to create and endow eight residential colleges for $15.7 million. He requested that James Gamble Rodgers, a classmate of Harkness who had already designed the Memorial Quadrangle and Sterling Memorial Library for Yale, serve as their architect. After appraising Harvard's larger houses, Yale decided to build colleges of 150 to 200 members each. A "Committee on Quadrangles" was convened to name the colleges, appoint masters, select designs, organize faculty fellowships, and determine their degree of autonomy within the university.

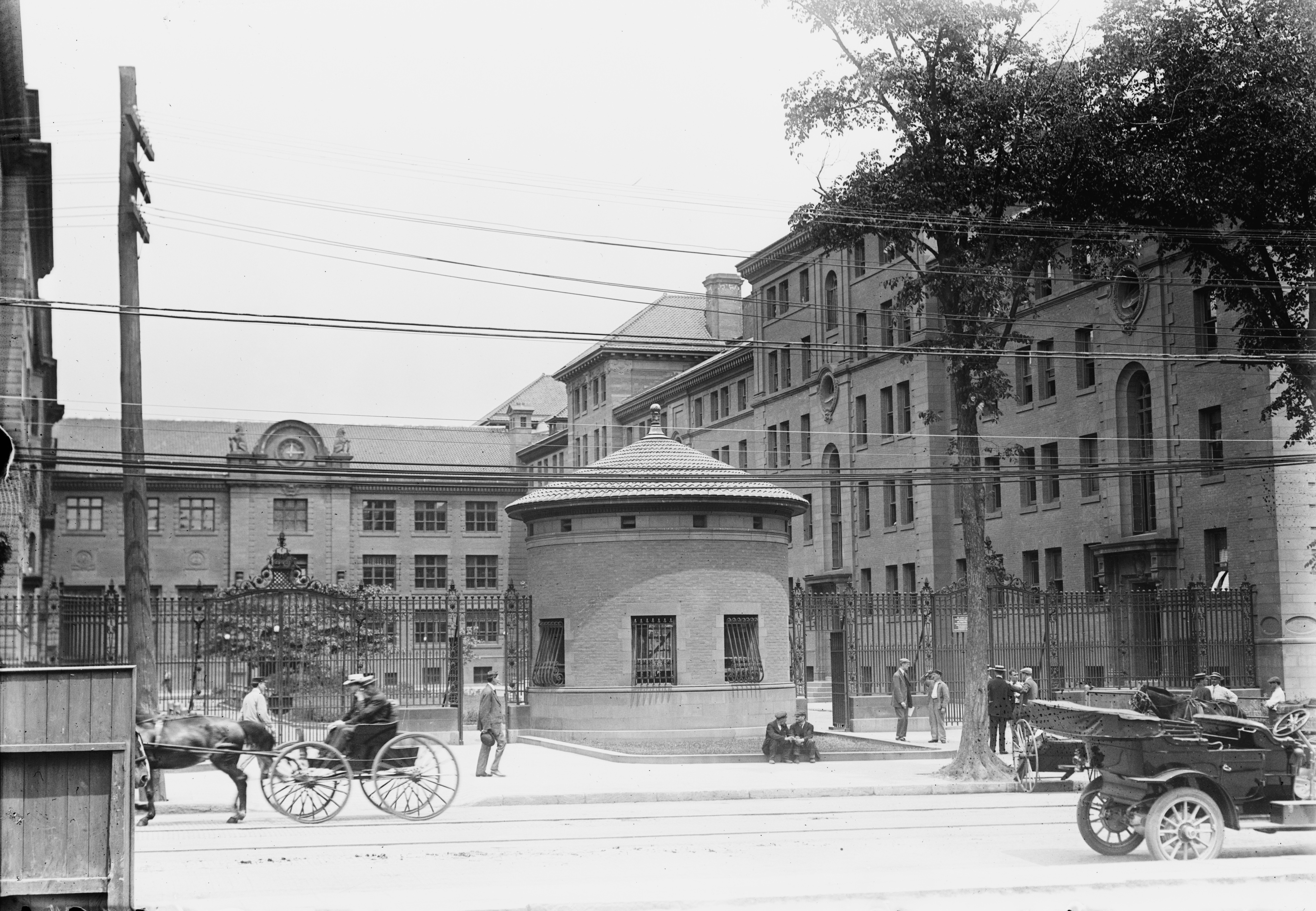
The Berkeley Oval, a student dormitory torn down for Berkeley College

New residential buildings required a major reconfiguration of Yale's central campus. Science buildings at the present-day sites of Jonathan Edwards, Branford, and Saybrook Colleges, including Sloane Physical Lab, Kent Chemical Lab, and the original Peabody Museum, were demolished and replaced by laboratories on Science Hill. The Yale Divinity School campus was moved for Calhoun College (renamed Hopper College in 2017), Berkeley College replaced the Berkeley Oval dormitories, and the university gym was displaced by Trumbull College. After three years of construction, the first seven residential colleges were opened on September 25, 1933, followed by Berkeley College in 1934, Timothy Dwight College in 1935, and Silliman College in 1940.

=== Early years (1933–1945) ===
Originally, students applied to join a college after their freshman year, and under this practice the colleges acquired specific social and class positions. Davenport, Branford and Pierson Colleges gained reputations as residences for the wealthy, while Saybrook and Trumbull were known as "scholarship" colleges. While these stratifications were balanced by the college masters, inequalities persisted until sophomore selection was abolished in 1962 and freshmen were randomly assigned to colleges before their matriculation. Thereafter, only students with legacy status or siblings at Yale were allowed to choose their college.

=== Post-war years (1945–1998) ===
In the early 1960s, two significant changes occurred in college admission and administration. Until 1962, freshmen had applied to residential colleges for admission in their sophomore year, leading to social distinctions between the colleges. After 1962, students were randomly assigned to a college before matriculation, though legacy students could choose to be in their father's (later, parent's) college. (Harvard students are randomly placed into houses during their freshman year.) Second, a gift from Paul Mellon allowed the colleges to endow deanships, giving students dedicated academic counsel and ending an era of college life solely administered by masters and their spouses.

Due to the abolition of the Freshman Year and growing enrollment, the university sought to expand the college system. In 1962, another gift from Mellon allowed Yale to build Morse College and Ezra Stiles College on the former site of James Hillhouse High School. Yale attempted to build two more residential colleges in 1972 on Whitney Avenue designed by Mitchell/Giurgola, but aborted the plan after the New Haven municipal government rejected an increase in Yale's non-taxable property. To accommodate increased enrollment, some of the colleges were given annex residences, primarily former fraternity buildings or previously unaffiliated residence halls.

In 1969, Yale College admitted its first class of women. Although President Kingman Brewster suggested housing all of the women in Trumbull College, student protest prompted the university to integrate them into all the colleges. In 1971, Katharine Lustman, a child educator, became the first woman Master at Yale after her husband died shortly before becoming Master of Davenport College; she served for two years.

=== Renovation and expansion (1998–present) ===
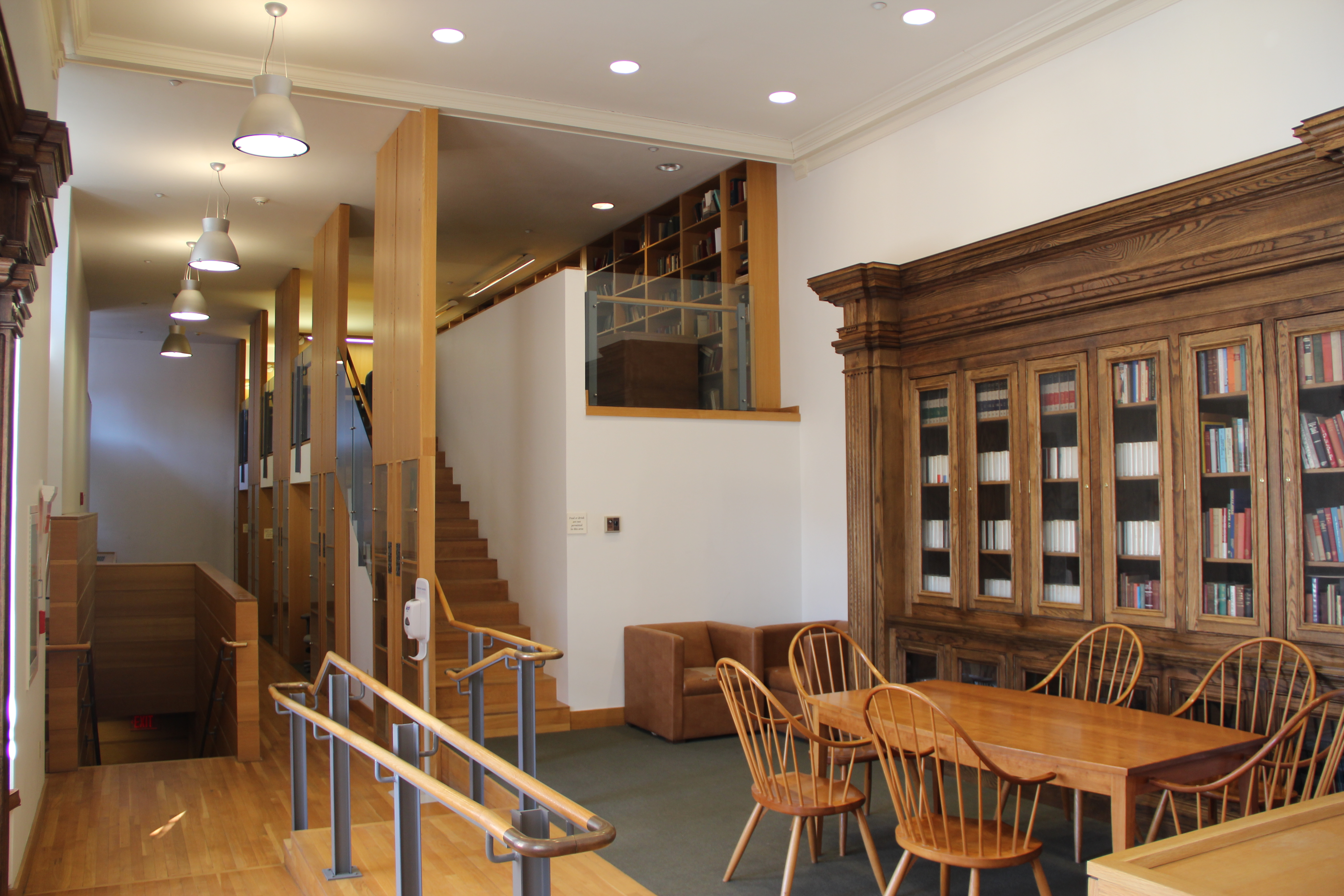
Pierson College library after its 2004 renovation

Between 1998 and 2012, Yale undertook yearlong renovations of all twelve colleges, beginning with Berkeley College. Since their opening, most had seen only routine maintenance and incremental improvements to plumbing, heating, and electrical and network wiring. Among other improvements, the renovated colleges received new basement facilities, including restaurants, game rooms, theaters, athletic facilities and music practice rooms. Dormitory buildings were added to Pierson and Davenport, and the finished underground space of many of the colleges was expanded. To allow renovations to be done during the academic year, Yale built a residence hall between Payne Whitney Gymnasium and the power plant, commonly called "Swing Space."

As these renovations began, administrators began considering an expansion of the college system. In June 2008, President Rick Levin announced plans to build two new colleges in the northern part of the campus between Grove Street Cemetery and Science Hill. The new colleges were expected to increase enrollment by 15%, to about 6,000 undergraduates, while reducing crowding in the existing colleges. Yale School of Architecture Dean Robert Stern, known for his contextual and traditionalist approach to architecture, was selected to design the colleges in a neo-Gothic style. Originally scheduled to be completed by 2013, construction was delayed by the 2008 economic recession. In September 2013, Yale announced a gift of $250 million from Charles B. Johnson for the two new colleges. Construction begun in January 2015 and was completed in summer 2017. The colleges were named after Pauli Murray and Benjamin Franklin.

== Organization ==
=== Administration ===
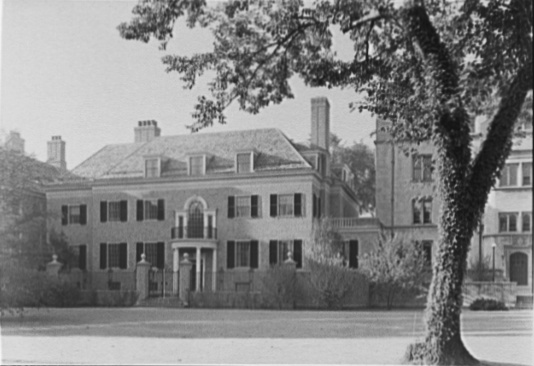
Master's House in Silliman College, 1940

Yale's residential colleges are dependent colleges of Yale University: separately administered but not autonomous or independently funded. Although following the residential and social model of the Oxbridge colleges, they do not similarly possess directly affiliated faculty and are similar in structure to the other collegiate universities of England such as Durham University. Each college is headed by a Head of College, a faculty member who is appointed by the university's president to serve as chief administrator of the college, and a Dean, who is appointed by the Dean of Yale College to oversee academic affairs for the students of the college. Each college has a house for the Head of College and their family, and private apartments for the Dean's family and resident fellows of the college. The Head of College is assisted by a group of student employees known as college aides who staff the Head of College office as well as events and receptions in the Head of College's House.

=== Undergraduates ===
All enrolled students in Yale College are members of a residential college. Although students once selected their choice college before sophomore year, entrenched social exclusion and economic inequality between the colleges prompted Yale to switch to a system of pre-matriculation sorting in 1962. Students are now randomly assigned to a residential college in the summer before their matriculation, with the provision that legacy students are allowed to choose whether to live in the same college as their alumnus parent or sibling.

Most first-year students live in dormitories on the Old Campus, the historical center of Yale College. Members of Timothy Dwight, Silliman, Benjamin Franklin, and Pauli Murray are the only students to live in their college as first years. Thereafter, students take rooms within the residential college by a lottery system. Due to overcrowding, many of the colleges have annex residences where upperclass members live, and some upperclass students live off campus while remaining members of their college.

=== Fellows ===
Yale faculty affiliate with the colleges as fellows by appointment of the Council of Masters, the governing body of the residential system. Fellows advise students, attend ceremonial functions of the college, and participate in its social and academic life. A small number keep offices in the college by invitation of the Head of College, and a few live in the colleges' faculty apartments as Resident Fellows along with the Dean and Head of College. Each college fellowship hosts weekly dinners for its members. Nearly all university academic functions exist outside the college, with the exception of a few undergraduate seminars hosted by the colleges and selected by their fellows.

=== Graduate affiliates ===
Students of Yale's graduate and professional schools are invited to be graduate affiliates of the colleges by their heads of college. The program offers dining hall meals and access to college facilities to the graduate students as well as mentorship for undergraduates. Colleges host up to three graduate affiliates as residents, where they help the heads of college organize lectures, teas, study breaks, and other functions. As resident fellows, they are junior members of the college fellowship.

== Design and architectural styling ==
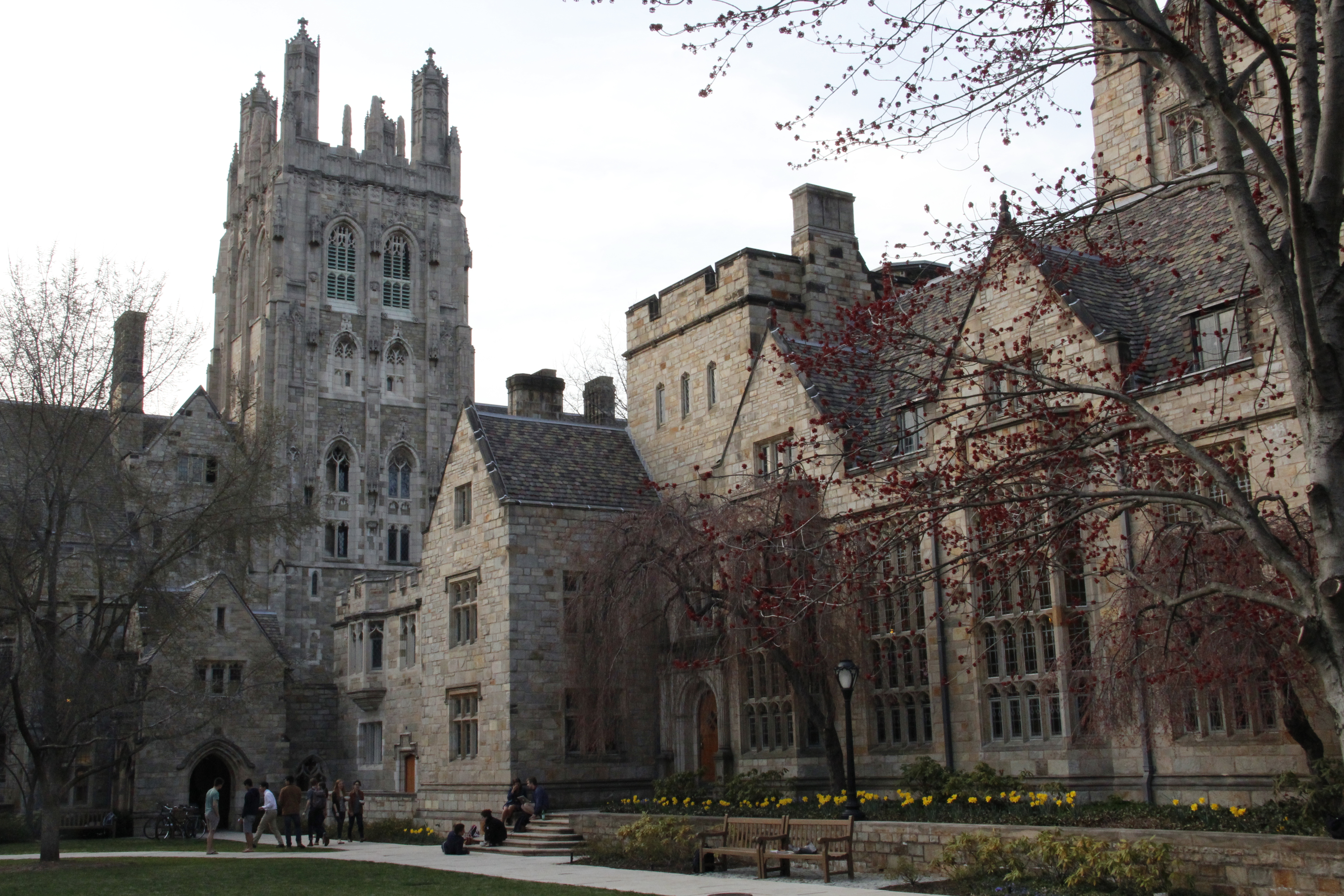
Branford Court, the Collegiate Gothic courtyard of Branford College

The colleges are organized around enclosed courtyards. Most are laid out in a quadrangle, although Morse and Ezra Stiles are irregularly organized. They are gated and usually closed to the public. Each college contains a dining hall, which students from any college are permitted to use, and extracurricular facilities. Every college also features common rooms, classrooms, a library, and a small gym; other facilities, which vary from college to college, include chapels, printing presses, squash courts, game parlors, basketball courts, pottery rooms, music rooms, short-order kitchens (known as "Butteries"), and darkrooms.

Unlike traditional college dormitories, residences in the colleges are arranged in suites, consisting of a common room and bedrooms for two to six students. Many of the colleges also have larger student suites, which are used to host parties and events. Most sophomores and seniors live in the colleges, along with many juniors, though some are placed in annex housing throughout the campus.

=== Architects and artisans ===
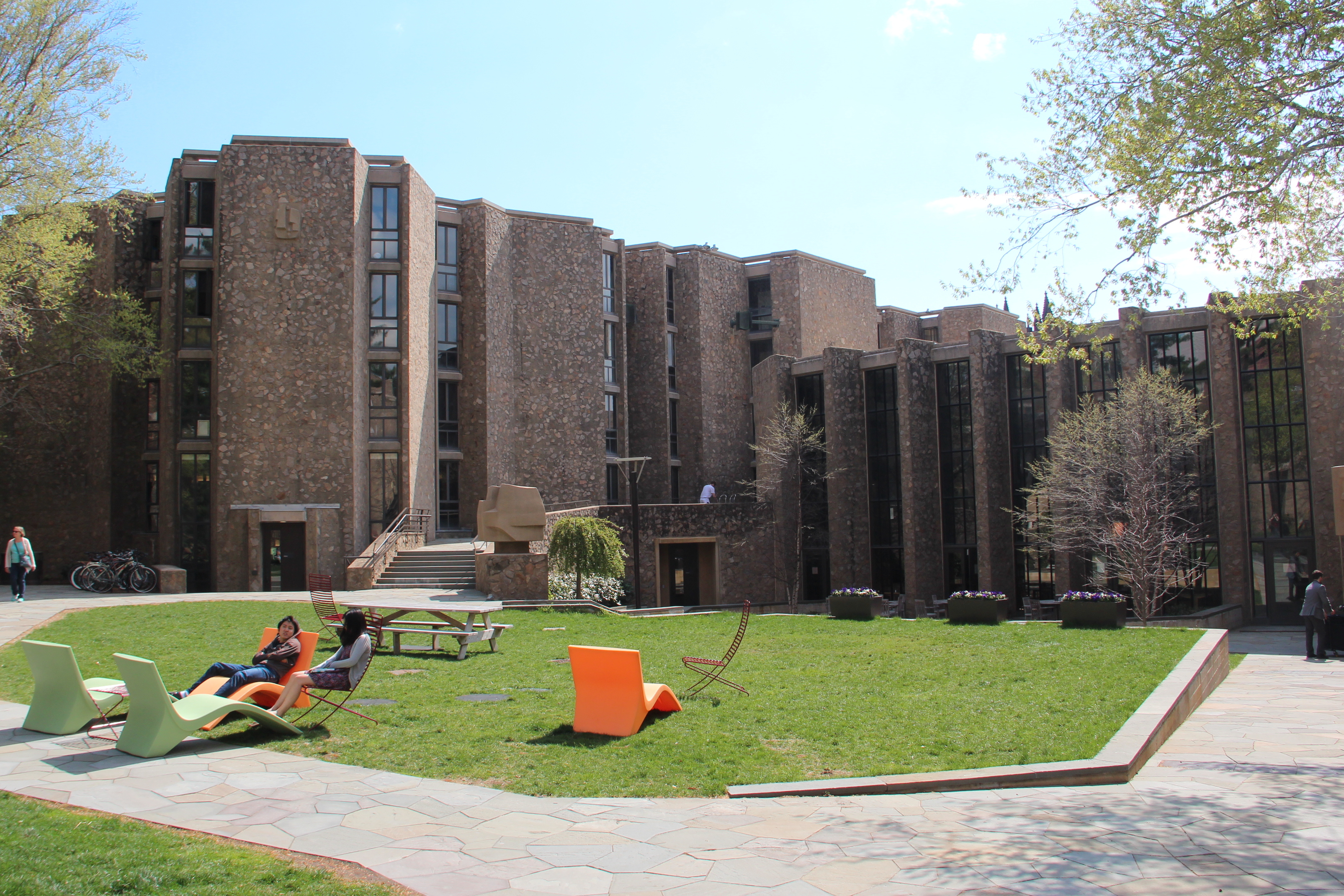
Morse College's Modernist courtyard

With eight designed by the same architect, James Gamble Rogers, the colleges exhibit strong stylistic harmony. Rogers' primary architectural motif was Collegiate Gothic, a derivative of Gothic Revival that emulated the Gothic quadrangles of Cambridge and Oxford colleges. Rogers had previously designed the Memorial Quadrangle as a Gothic dormitory, which was renovated to become Branford and Saybrook Colleges. Similarly, Rogers framed the Jonathan Edwards College quadrangle with existing buildings. Rogers' Gothic buildings at Yale made extensive use of granite masonry and ornament. A small group of artisans—including blacksmith Samuel Yellin and sculptor Lee Lawrie—executed most of the buildings' elaborate details. Georgian was the primary style of two of Rogers' colleges, Pierson and Davenport, though Davenport has a street-facing Gothic facade. His final college, Timothy Dwight, was Federal, a reference to the prevailing style in American colonial colleges.

Two of the pre-war colleges were designed by other architects. Calhoun College—now known as Grace Hopper College— by John Russell Pope, employed Rogers' Gothic style with greater emphasis on brick materials. Silliman College, assembled from existing facilities of the Sheffield Scientific School by Eggers & Higgins, is an amalgamation of Gothic Revival, French Renaissance, and Georgian. Constructed 30 years later, Morse and Ezra Stiles Colleges were conceived by Eero Saarinen, a mid-century modernist architect, as angular reinventions of the Tuscan village.

== Programs and traditions ==
Although primarily residential centers, the colleges are also intended to be hubs of intellectual life. Since the colleges' opening, masters have regularly hosted Master's Teas, conversations with distinguished guests open to undergraduates and fellows of the colleges. In addition, the colleges each support a seminar program, where students and fellows select scholars to lead specialized coursework for credit in Yale College.

Fellows of the colleges support the college's freshman advising programs. Each fellowship also organizes a formal weekly dinner for its members, usually held in a private common room for faculty members. Upperclassmen are often invited to join the fellows for conversation and presentations.

Seniors in the colleges participate in a series of weekly dinner presentations known as the Mellon Forum, where classmates present senior thesis research. These projects are often advised by graduate affiliates and fellows in the college. The program is named for Paul Mellon, whose Old Dominion Foundation endowed a number of academic programs for the college system.

=== Intramurals ===
While intramural sports have been played at Yale since the nineteenth century, the advent of the college system introduced formal intramural competition. The annual, student-run program includes several dozen events, including soccer, basketball, softball, cross country, water polo, bowling, golf, and table tennis. In addition to undergraduates, fellows and the families of the masters and deans are also eligible to play. Hundreds of matches are played each year between the colleges, and the most winning college across all events receives the Tyng Cup. Every year during the Harvard–Yale Game, two winning intramural teams face off against their Harvard counterparts for the Harkness Cup.

=== Printing ===
As recently as the 1980s, every residential college possessed letterpress shops in order to print announcements, posters, stationery, and menus, projects now dominated by digital printing. Many of the colleges' presses were inherited from major printing studios. Three shops remain, and only those in Jonathan Edwards and Davenport College are still in frequent use. Printing arts are still taught through college seminars, and the remaining shops are managed by students with assistance from master printers.

=== Bladderball ===
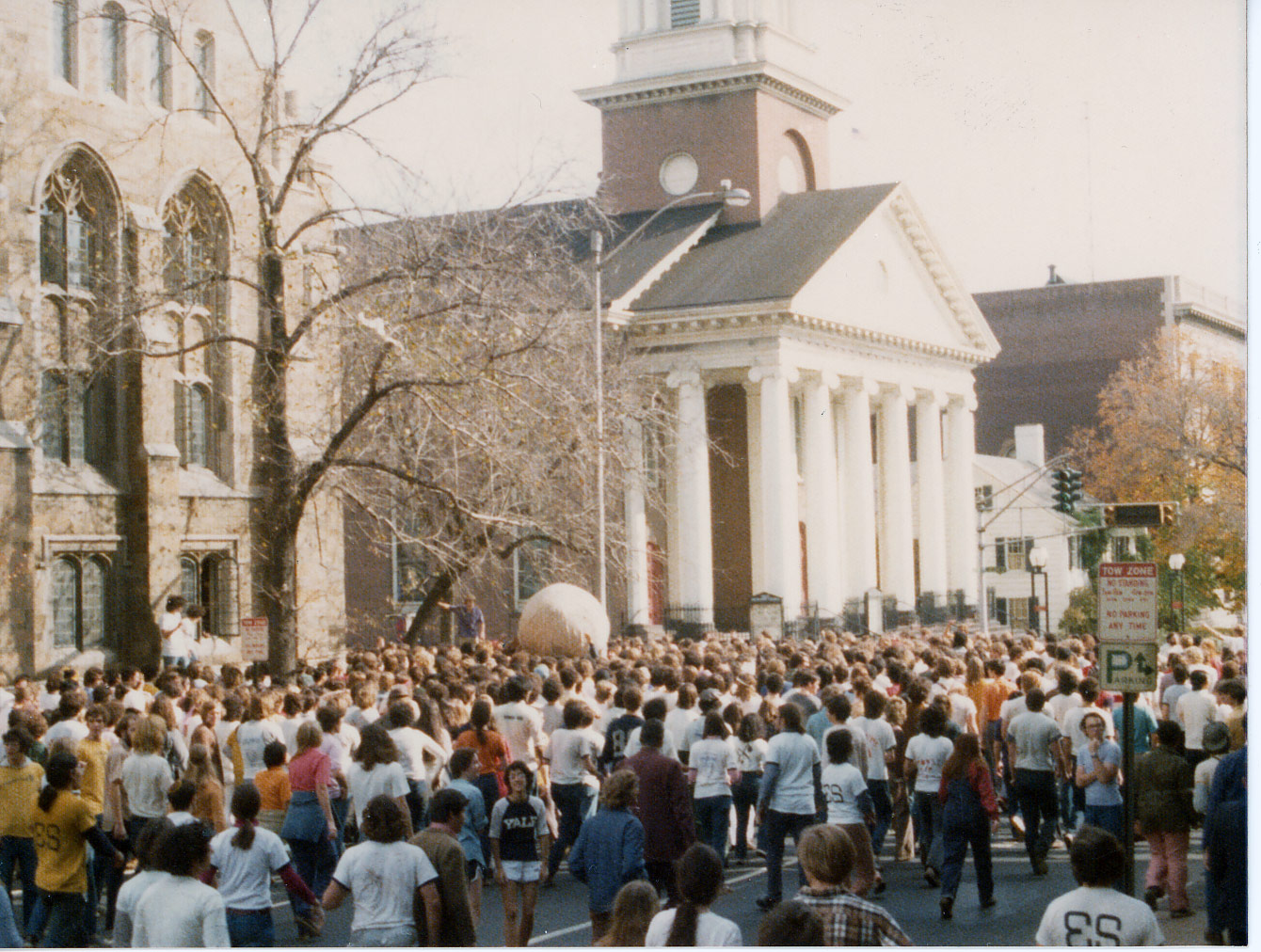
The 1973 Bladderball game in front of Calhoun College

Introduced in 1954, Bladderball was an annual inter-college competition traditional held before the Yale–Dartmouth football game. Organizers would release a large canvas ball on Old Campus, and thousands of students would attempt to route the ball to their college courtyard, sometimes popping it in the attempt. Deemed anarchic and dangerous, the game was banned by the Dean's Office in 1982 and only briefly resurfaced in 2009.

== Fellowships and awards ==
=== Visiting fellowships ===
In addition to Master's Teas, several of the colleges have independent endowments to invite speakers and guest lecturers to present to the college and interact with its students and faculty. Among the most notable are the Tetelman Fellowship, awarded semi-annually by Jonathan Edwards College to a person distinguished in science, and the Chubb Fellowship, awarded several times each semester by Timothy Dwight College to distinguished politicians, writers, and scholars. Both these fellowships are offered by the college master and involve a public address followed by a private reception, seminar, or dinner with members of the college. Past Tetelman Fellows include James Watson, Murray Gell-Mann, Ben Carson, and the Dalai Lama. Past Chubb Fellows include Aung San Suu Kyi, Chinua Achebe, George H. W. Bush, Harry Truman, Adlai Stevenson, John Kenneth Galbraith, Gwendolyn Brooks, and Lewis Mumford.

=== Student fellowships ===
The colleges hold funds for student research and performing arts projects. Two of the richest are the Bates Fellowship, given by the Jonathan Edwards College faculty fellowship to students conducting senior thesis research, and the Sudler Awards, given for performing arts projects each semester. Students may also apply for post-graduate fellowships for a year of study or travel.

=== Student awards ===
Several kinds of awards are given to students by the colleges. For all undergraduates, annual competitions are held for oratory, book collection, translation, and essay writing. At the discretion of the Council of Masters, juniors may receive awards for leadership, scholarship, or service. At graduation, seniors in each college may receive prizes for their senior thesis, college or extracurricular leadership, or distinction in scholarship, arts or athletics. Although these prizes varied in wealth depending on their original endowment, in 2010 all undergraduate prizes were capped at $1,000, with the excess awarded as financial aid, and the administration began discouraging the establishment of new prize funds by alumni. An investigation of the prize caps by Connecticut Attorney General Richard Blumenthal found no violation of donor intent.

== Controversy ==
=== Associations with American slavery ===
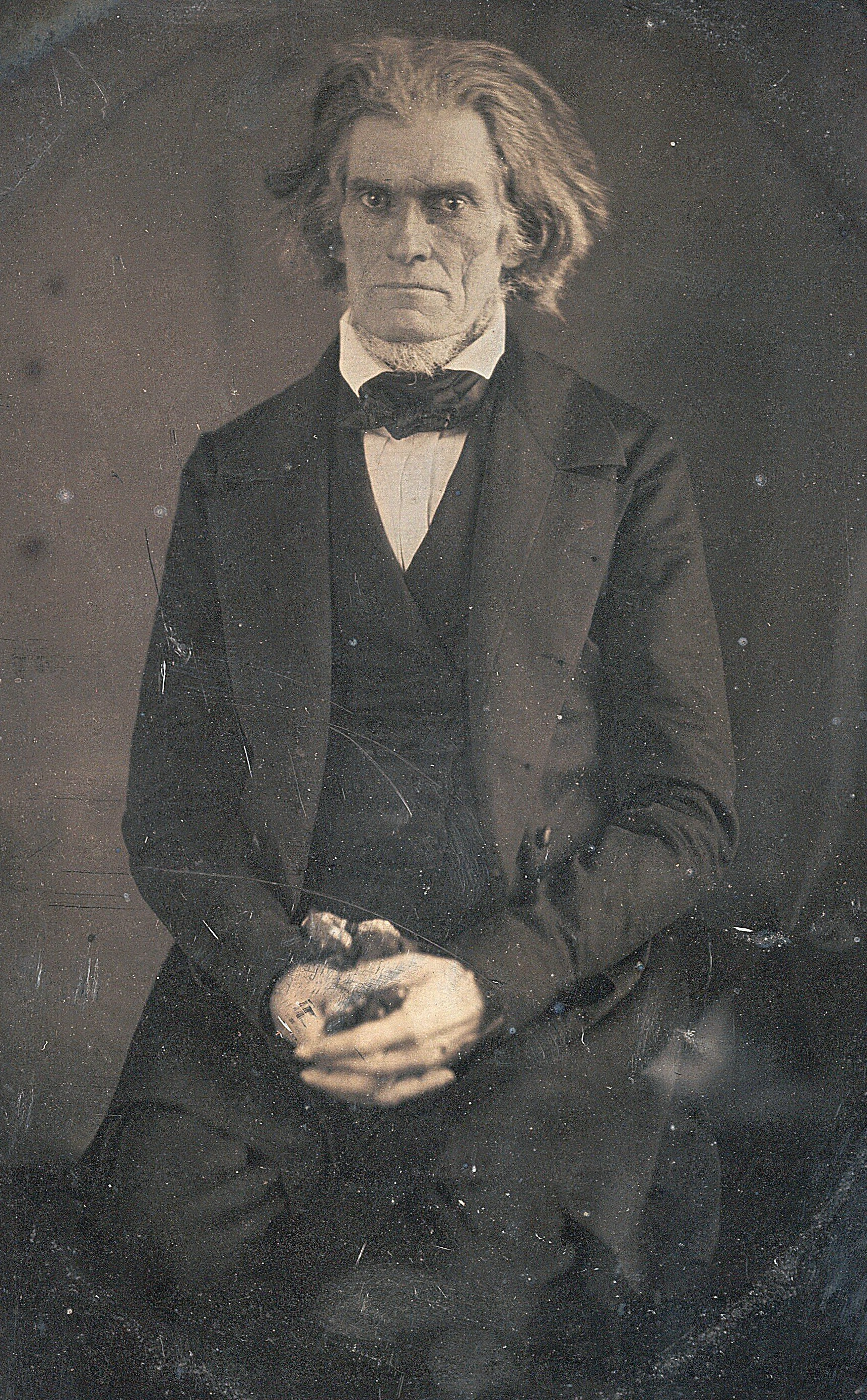
John C. Calhoun, Yale alumnus, slaveholder, abolition opponent, and namesake of Calhoun College which was renamed Hopper College

Eight (formerly nine) of the 14 colleges are named after American slaveowners, a fact to which some Yale students and faculty have objected.

Particularly controversial was Calhoun College, named for John C. Calhoun, a leading slavery apologist and secessionist in Congress before the American Civil War, which was renamed Grace Hopper College in 2017 following a long campaign. Calhoun represented the slave-holding state of South Carolina in Congress for slightly over three decades. Arguments for renaming Calhoun College in particular had been made since the early 1990s, with greater force and additional emphasis on other slaveowner-named colleges after a 2001 report on Yale's commemoration of slaveowners. In 2009, a student group protested the connection by posting alternative names for slaveowner-named colleges near the college entrances. In the 2015–16 school year, the colleges' relation to slavery and racial oppression received heavy attention. In the aftermath of the Charleston shooting, Calhoun College received particular attention as one of several American institutions named for the white supremacist Vice President. Simultaneously, the word "master", a title borrowed from the UK collegiate tradition but also a synonym for "slaveowner" in the US, received scrutiny at several US universities.

In April 2016, Yale President Peter Salovey announced that it would follow Harvard and MIT in changing the appellation of "Master" to "Head of College". Salovey also announced that the university would not rename Calhoun College and that one of the two colleges then under construction would be named for Benjamin Franklin. In February 2017, Salovey reversed his decision on Calhoun College, announcing that it would be renamed. Since 2017, the college is named Grace Hopper, in honor of the United States Navy rear admiral and pioneer computer scientist.

In addition to these titular connections, Pierson and Timothy Dwight Colleges have strong architectural associations to slavery. Timothy Dwight, a Georgian Revival structure, was influenced by Southern plantation architecture. Although the name has fallen out of use, a secluded courtyard in Pierson was known widely as the "Slave Quarters" for its Southern-style house-like buildings adjacent to the college's main courtyard. Until 1960, Pierson students were referred to collectively as "Slaves."

In Branford and Calhoun colleges, stained-glass windows depicting pastoral scenes of Black American enslavement were installed prominently. Black students raised public objections about these panels as early as 1981. In summer 2016, several months after Yale announced it would keep Calhoun as a namesake, Calhoun College employee Corey Menafee dislodged a panel of enslaved cotton pickers with a broom, breaking it. Menafee, a Black man, said the panels were “racist, very degrading." Menafee was fired by the university, but rehired after student protested in favor of his actions. All the stained-glass panels depicting slavery have since been removed.

== List of residential colleges ==
Name	Opened	Namesake	Students	Architectural style
Berkeley College	1934	The Rev. George Berkeley	450	Collegiate Gothic
Branford College	1933	Branford, Connecticut	461	Collegiate Gothic
Davenport College	1933	John Davenport	477	Collegiate Gothic, Georgian
Ezra Stiles College	1961	Ezra Stiles	478	Modernist
Jonathan Edwards College	1933	Jonathan Edwards	427	Gothic Revival
Benjamin Franklin College	2017	Benjamin Franklin	452	Collegiate Gothic
Grace Hopper College*	1933	Grace Hopper	425	Collegiate Gothic
Morse College	1961	Samuel Morse	471	Modernist
Pauli Murray College	2017	The Rev. Pauli Murray	452	Collegiate Gothic
Pierson College	1933	Abraham Pierson	496	Georgian
Saybrook College	1933	Old Saybrook, Connecticut	484	Collegiate Gothic
Silliman College	1940	Benjamin Silliman	456	Gothic Revival, French Renaissance, Georgian
Timothy Dwight College	1935	Timothy Dwight IV and Timothy Dwight V	399	Federal
Trumbull College	1933	Jonathan Trumbull	390	Collegiate Gothic

* Named Calhoun College, after John C. Calhoun, until 2017.
