= Grace Hopper College =

College of Yale University

- Residential college
- Yale University
- Coat of Arms of Grace Hopper College (Adopted 2017)
- Location: 189 Elm Street
- Coordinates: 41.309974°N 72.927241°W
- Motto: Una imus in altum (Latin)
- Motto in English: Into the deep heaven we go
- Established: 1933 (as Calhoun College)
- Named for: Grace Murray Hopper formerly, John C. Calhoun
- Former names: Calhoun College
- Architect: James Gamble Rogers
- Colors: Black, Navy Blue, Gold, Silver
- Sister college: Kirkland House, Harvard
- Head: Samuel Moyn
- Dean: David Francis
- Undergraduates: 425 (2013–2014)
- Mascot: Dolphin
- Website: gracehopper.yalecollege.yale.edu

Grace Hopper College is a residential college of Yale University, opened in 1933 as one of the original eight undergraduate residential colleges endowed by Edward Harkness. It was originally named Calhoun College after John C. Calhoun, who served as vice president of the United States from 1825 to 1832, but was renamed in 2017 in honor of computer scientist Grace Murray Hopper. The building was designed by John Russell Pope.

From the 1960s onward, Calhoun's white supremacist beliefs and pro-slavery leadership had prompted calls to rename the college and remove its tributes to Calhoun. In 2016, the Yale Corporation chose to retain the Calhoun name, but in 2017 it reversed its decision and renamed the college after Hopper.

== History ==
=== Before the college ===
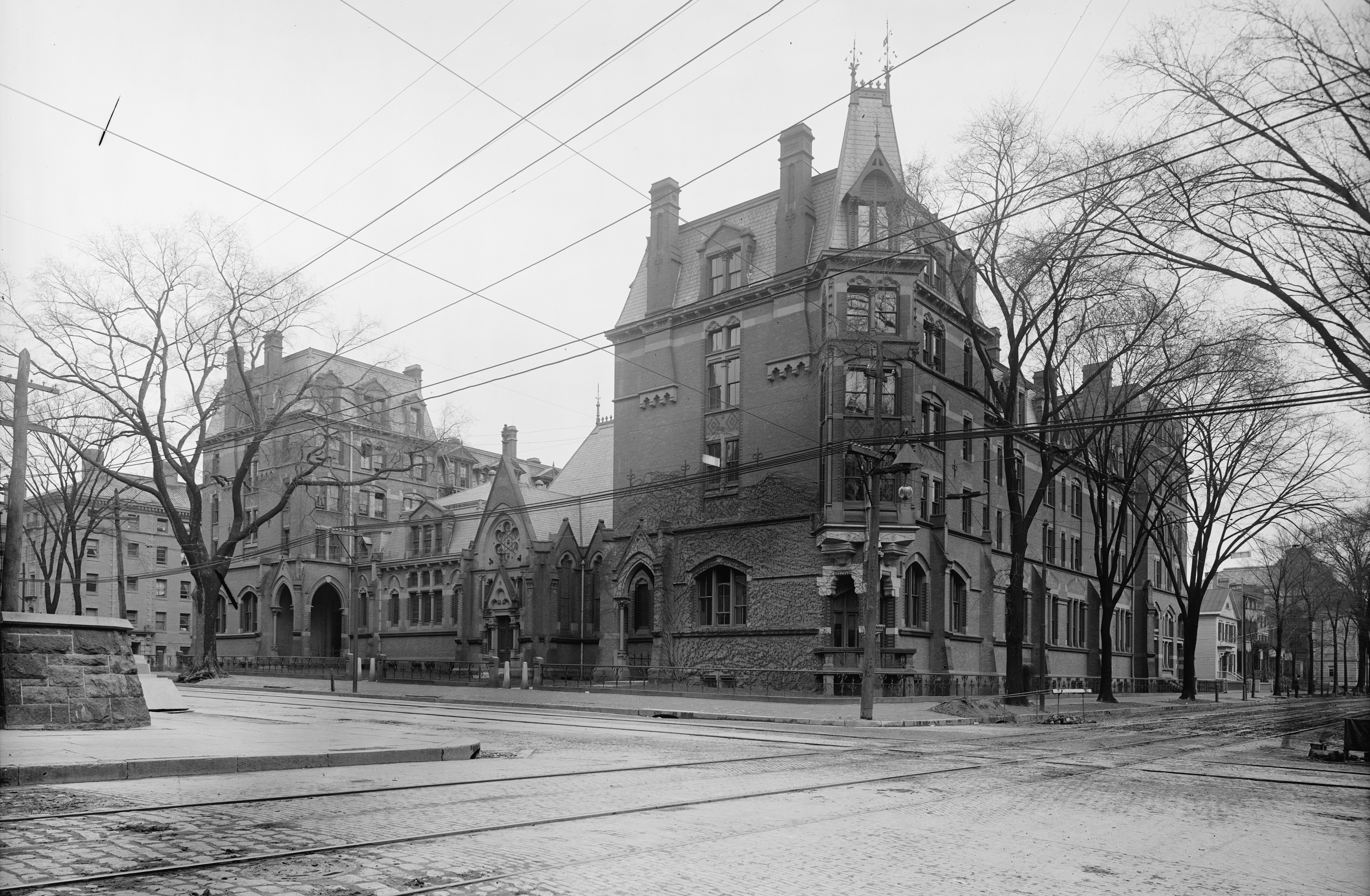
Divinity Hall, demolished in 1931 to build the college, from New Haven Green

In 1641, John Brockston established a farm on the plot of land that is now Grace Hopper College. After the American Revolutionary War an inn was constructed that would later become the meeting place of Phi Beta Kappa society. From 1863 until 1931 the land was home to the Yale Divinity School, which was housed in three buildings known as West Divinity Hall, Marquand Chapel, and East Divinity Hall. After Yale President James Rowland Angell announced the residential college plan in 1930, the Divinity School campus was demolished and a new campus built at the top of Prospect Hill, where it currently stands.

=== Construction and early history ===
Arms of Calhoun College

Although all the other Collegiate Gothic-style colleges at Yale were conceived by James Gamble Rogers, the commission for the new college at the corner of College and Elm Streets was given to John Russell Pope, a campus planner who concurrently designed the Payne Whitney Gymnasium. The new dormitory was named Calhoun College.

Like all other residential colleges at their inception, the college had twenty-four-hour guard service and the gates were never locked. Jacket and tie was the necessary attire in the dining hall and meals were served at the table.

At first, it was considered an undesirable college because of its location at the corner of College and Elm, where trolleys frequently ran screeching around the corner. This perception changed under the popular Master Charles Schroeder, who once remarked that if the despicable trolley service were ever removed he would purchase a trolley car, put it in the courtyard, and hold a celebration to commemorate the event. The trolley system was indeed removed in 1949, and though a whole car proved unfeasible, Master Schroder secured the fare collecting machine from a trolley and made good on his promise to celebrate. Thus was born Trolley Night, a proud tradition of the college.

The coat of arms designed for Calhoun College combined the university arms, set atop the Calhoun arms (a saltire engrailed sable on a field argent). The college colors were black, navy blue, and gold.

Under the Yale College policy that let incoming students express a residential college preference, Calhoun developed a reputation for attracting athletic, upper-class elites until the policy ended with the class of 1958.

=== Later events ===
Views

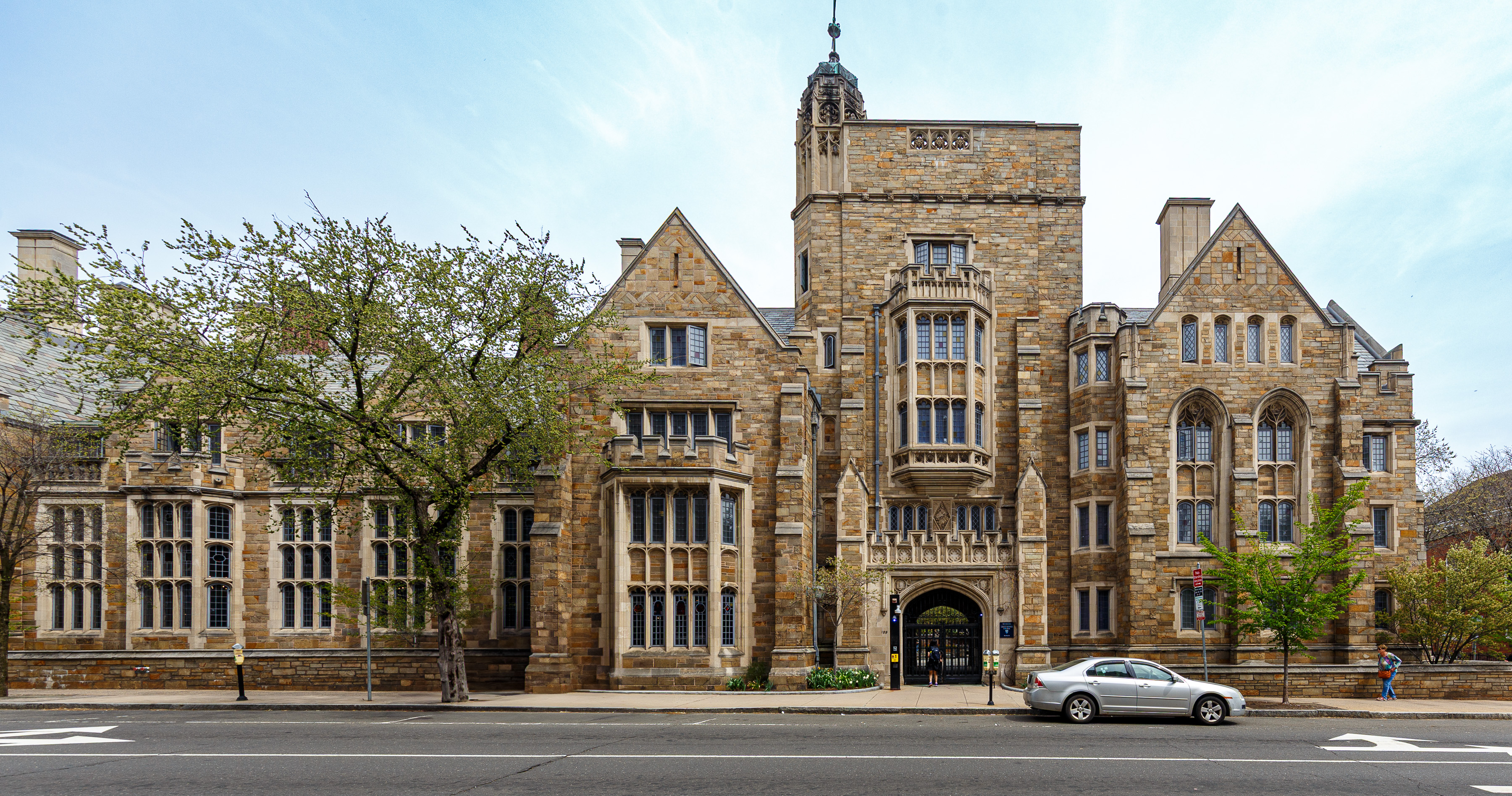
Elm Street façade

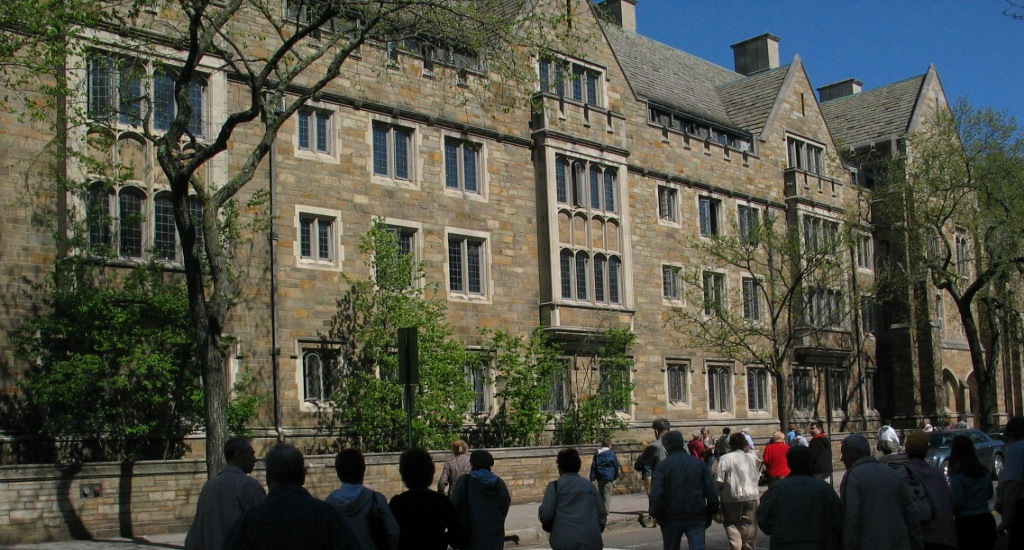
College Street façade

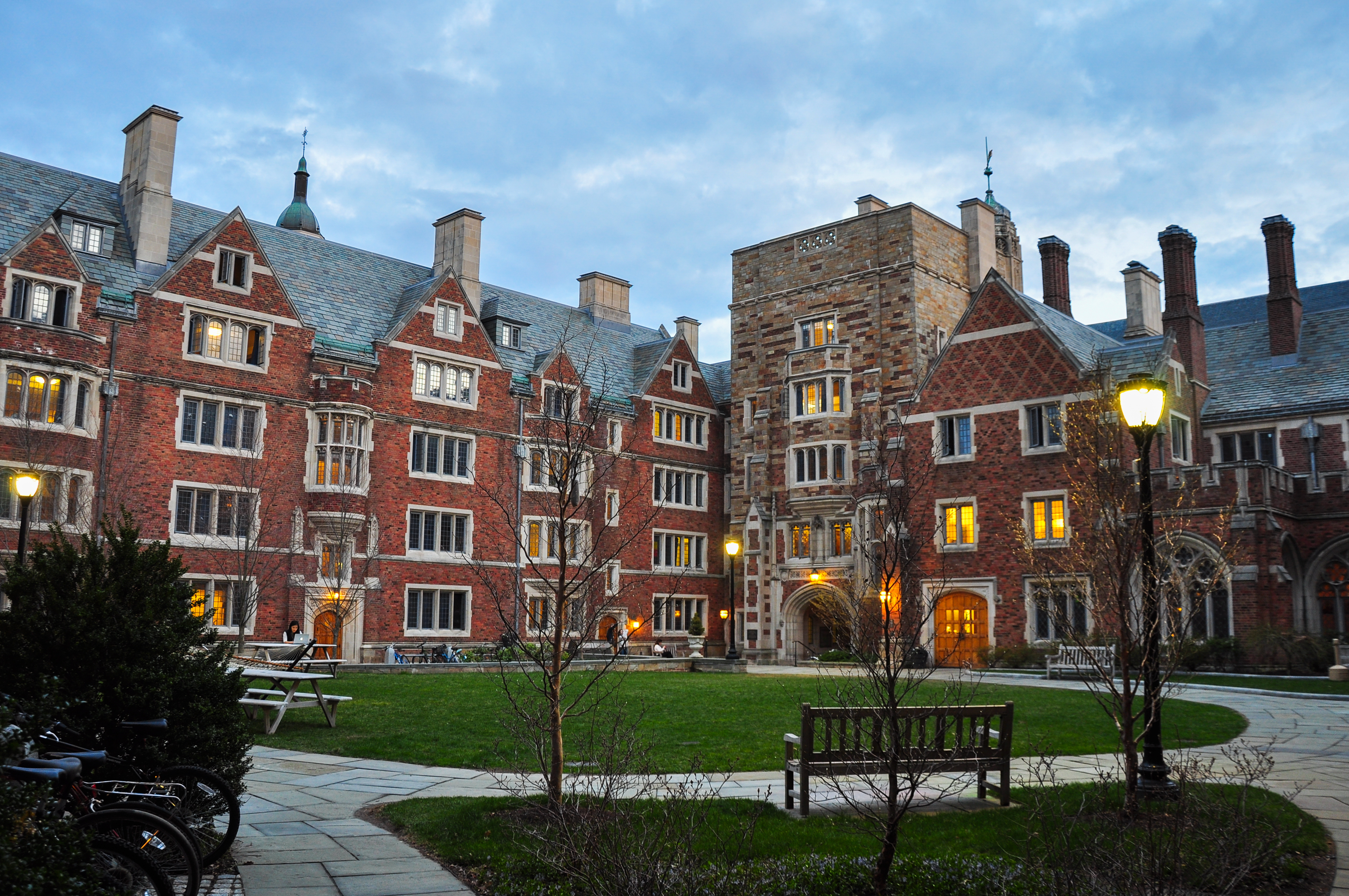
Courtyard

In 1989, Calhoun was the first residential college to be renovated. The renovations, mostly funded by alumnus Roger Horchow, were done quickly and over the summer to minimize disruption to student life, and by 2000, the physical plant began to show wear and tear again.

2005 saw the retirement of William and Betsy Sledge as master and associate master. They were succeeded by Dr. Jonathan Holloway (PhD '95) and his wife Aisling Colón. In 2014, Holloway became Dean of Yale College, the first African-American to hold that position. He was succeeded as master by Julia Adams, Margaret H. Marshall Professor of Sociology. In the same year a limited window replacement was commissioned amid controversy over the college's exclusion from the most recent campus-wide renovation effort.

Stephen Lassonde stepped down as dean in June 2007 thus ending one of the longest tenures in the college's history. Within the residential college system at Yale, deanships normally last only a few years, but Stephen Lassonde served as Calhoun dean for fourteen years. In late April 2007, he made the official announcement that he would be leaving the college to serve as a deputy dean of the college at Brown University in nearby Providence, Rhode Island. He was succeeded by Leslie Woodard, who died unexpectedly at her home at the college in October 2013. Until June 2007 Dean Woodard was the director of the undergraduate creative writing program at Columbia University. A published author of short stories, Dean Woodard also had a history in the performing arts; she was a professional dancer in the Dance Theater of Harlem for a decade.

In late June 2007 the college's mighty elm, which had provided shade since the college's foundation and also supported the college's famous tire swing, was felled. The tree was rotting from the ground up and was beginning to lean dangerously. Given the fact that the tree was actually taller than the college (itself a five- and six-story building in different places), the tree posed a real danger to the college structure and students.

The college was eventually fully renovated over the 2008–2009 school year.

== Namesakes and Calhoun controversy ==
=== John C. Calhoun ===
John C. Calhoun grew up on a plantation in South Carolina. He entered Yale College in November 1802. His professors included Benjamin Silliman, and Yale Presidents Jeremiah Day and Timothy Dwight. Calhoun was socially ostracized at Yale and wrote to his cousin that he found “a considerable prejudice here against both the southern states and students.” He did well academically, was selected as a member of the Linonia literary society, and graduated Phi Beta Kappa in 1804. He was selected to give his commencement address, but was prevented from doing so by illness.

Calhoun remained in Connecticut for several years to obtain a law degree from Litchfield Law School, then returned to South Carolina. After his student years, Calhoun never again had significant involvement in Yale and was never a benefactor. Calhoun's plantation estate later became the campus of Clemson University.

Elected to the United States Congress in 1810, he made his name as a War Hawk before the War of 1812, then became Secretary of War under President James Monroe. He was elected Vice President in 1825 and served two terms before resigning to fight for South Carolina's nullification of federal tariffs as a Senator. During his political career, Calhoun gained a reputation as a great rhetorician and intellectual. In addition to his advocacy of states' rights, Calhoun was a proponent of slaveholder rights and believed that slavery was justified by white supremacy.

=== Naming of Calhoun College ===
Because of his political, military, and intellectual achievements, Calhoun was venerated as an illustrious Yale alumnus beginning in the mid-nineteenth century. He was the only Yale graduate to be elected to a federal executive office in the school's first two centuries, until the election of U.S. President William Howard Taft in 1909. A 1914 biography of Calhoun by Yale Secretary Anson Phelps Stokes details his accomplishments as an "eminent Yale man" without once mentioning his slaveholdings or pro-slavery leadership.

Already holding some of Calhoun's papers, Yale offered its first commemoration of Calhoun during the construction of the Memorial Quadrangle in 1917. Statues of eight pre-20th century "Yale worthies" were placed on Harkness Tower, including an eight-foot statue of Calhoun. Of these, only Calhoun and Jonathan Edwards were selected as namesakes of the eight original residential colleges when they were named around 1931.

=== Re-naming debates ===
A debate over the appropriateness of the college's name has waxed and waned, as John C. Calhoun's involvement in defending slavery has been reconsidered. In 1992, the graduating seniors commissioned a plaque noting the unfortunate reality of John C. Calhoun's legacy, but at the same time supported the notion that the college retain its name for historical purposes. Around the same time, a pane of stained glass in the college's common room depicting a shackled black man kneeling before Calhoun was altered to depict Calhoun alone.

After the June 2015 Charleston church shooting, radio commentators Colin McEnroe and Ray Hardman questioned whether the preservation of the college's name was an inappropriate legacy of white supremacy. The events, which instigated student protests and alumni petitions in the same year, caused administrators to consider renaming the college. In their petition students argued that—while Calhoun was respected in the nineteenth century as an "extraordinary American statesman"—he was "one of the most prolific defenders of slavery and white supremacy" in the history of the United States. In August 2015 Yale President Peter Salovey addressed the freshman class of 2019 in which he responded to the racial tensions but explained why the college would not be renamed. He described Calhoun as "a notable political theorist, a vice president to two different U.S. presidents, a secretary of war and of state, and a congressman and senator representing South Carolina." He acknowledged that Calhoun also "believed that the highest forms of civilization depend on involuntary servitude. Not only that, but he also believed that the races he thought to be inferior, black people in particular, ought to be subjected to it for the sake of their own best interests."

In April 2016 Salovey announced that "despite decades of vigorous alumni and student protests," Calhoun's name would remain on the Yale residential college. Salovey argued that it was preferable for Yale students to live in Calhoun's "shadow" so they will be "better prepared to rise to the challenges of the present and the future." He claimed that if they removed Calhoun's name, it would "obscure" his "legacy of slavery rather than addressing it." "Yale is part of that history" and "We cannot erase American history, but we can confront it, teach it and learn from it." At the same time, Salovey announced that the title of “master” would be changed to “head of college” because of the title's freighted use by American slaveowners.

=== Artistic depictions of antebellum slavery ===
Stained glass window panels in the college depicted images of slavery, including picking cotton and kneeling in shackles before Calhoun. Temple University professor and co-founder of the Yale Black Alumni Network Chris Rabb advocated for that panel to be altered. The alterations replaced the black man with blank white pieces of glass. The university had plans to change some additional stained glass windows in the dining hall in 2016, but, before that was done, Corey Menafee, an African American dishwasher who worked there, knocked out the pane that showed black slaves harvesting cotton in the fields, because, as he related, he no longer wanted to be subjected to seeing the "racist, very degrading" image at his place of work, but also added: "There's always better ways of doing things like that than just destroying things." Menafee was initially arrested on felony and misdemeanor charges. Yale chose not to press charges which were then dropped and, after initially accepting Menafee's resignation, rehired him to work at a different location.

Calhoun's name has been tied up in larger controversies about the associations of the colleges with slavery. A 2001 report revealed that at least seven of the colleges' namesakes were slave owners. In 2009, a student group protested the connection by posting alternative names for slaveowner-named colleges near the college entrances. Writing in the Wall Street Journal, Roger Kimball pointed out that Yale's namesake, Elihu Yale, was a slave trader, and questioned how Yale could defend the name of the university against similar moral arguments.

=== Renaming ===
Partly because of the controversy surrounding the 2016 decision not to rename Calhoun College, Yale put in place a policy on the potential renaming of buildings and other institutions around the university. One of the first items of business the consequent task force addressed was the renaming of Calhoun College, and in February 2017 it recommended to the Yale Corporation that the college's name be changed. The corporation accepted that recommendation, and voted at its February 2017 meeting to change the name of Calhoun to Grace Hopper College, effective July 1, 2017.

The college's new namesake has a tie to Yale, having received her PhD from there under the direction of Øystein Ore in 1934.

The college's new arms, designed in 2017, were intended to represent Admiral Hopper's history, as well as to create a tie to the college's past. The heraldic dolphin represents both leadership and Hopper's career in the United States Navy. The rectangles and circles represent her contributions to mathematics and computer science. The scalloped (engrailed) bar is evocative of waves—and also incorporates a design element of the Calhoun College arms, which featured an engrailed saltire.

== Unique features ==
The courtyard used to have a popular tire swing, which stood in stark contrast to the Neo-Gothic architecture. In fall 1990, newly appointed master Turan Onat made it his first priority to remove the tire swing as he sought "to restore the courtyard to a grassier state." The seniors immediately reinstalled the swing overnight and Onat quickly reversed his policy.

The college used to be the only residential college with its own sauna. The sauna was removed from Entryway B/C during the 2005–06 school year.

The College Council is a student governing organization that coordinates activities and social life for the residential college. Throughout the year, the Council organizes numerous activities including: Study Breaks, a dorm-wide dance, and Trolley Night, an annual dance party.

== Notable alumni ==
- Leigh Bardugo, 1997, author
- Angela Bassett, 1980, actress
- John R. Bolton, 1970, National Security Advisor of the United States, attorney
- David L. Boren, 1963, Governor of Oklahoma, US Senator, Chancellor, University of Oklahoma
- Sandra Boynton, 1974, author
- Robert Curtis Brown, 1979, actor
- Jonathan Coulton, 1993, singer-songwriter
- Claire Danes, 2002, actress (attended)
- Mark Dayton, 1969, governor of Minnesota
- Bryce Dessner, 1998, composer and guitarist with The National
- Jodie Foster, 1985, actress
- Henry Louis Gates Jr., 1973, author, literary critic, professor
- John Hodgman, 1994, comedian
- Roger Horchow, 1950, Tony Award-winning Producer and founder of The Horchow Finale
- Paul Krugman, 1974, economist, New York Times columnist, winner of the Nobel Prize in Economics, 2008
- Demetri Martin, 1995, comedian
- Steven Mnuchin, 1985, United States Treasury Secretary
- Jennie Livingston, 1983, filmmaker
- William Nordhaus, 1963, economist, winner of the Nobel Prize in Economics, 2018
- George Packer, 1982, journalist, author, playwright
- Katie Porter, 1996, member of the US House of Representatives.
- Joshua Prince-Ramus, 1991, architect
- Philip T. Reeker, 1986, Acting Assistant Secretary of State, diplomat and career foreign service officer
- Kurt Hugo Schneider, 2010, internet celebrity
- Jake Sullivan, 1998, foreign policy adviser to Joe Biden and Hillary Clinton
- Maury Yeston, 1967, Tony Award-winning composer, lyricist, musicologist
- Itamar Moses, 1999, Tony Award-winning playwright
- Amia Srinivasan, 2007, philosopher
- Ray Jayawardhana, 1994, 10th President of the California Institute of Technology

== Masters/heads of college and deans ==
Master/Head of College	Term
Arnold Whitridge (grandson of poet Matthew Arnold)	1933-42
John Charles Schroeder	1942-54
Archibald Smith Foord	1955-64
B. Davie Napier	1964-66
R. W. B. Lewis	1966-72
Robert Wilhelm	1972-73
Charles T. Davis	1973-80
B. Davie Napier	1980-84
Ramsay MacMullen	1984-90
E. Turan Onat	1990-95
William H. Sledge	1995-2005
Jonathan Holloway	2005-14
Amy Hungerford (acting)	2011-12
Julia Adams (as Head of College from 27 April 2016)	2014-24
Samuel Moyn	2024-

Dean	Term
Stephen Windsor Reed	1963-66
Jefferey Barnouw	1966-69
Robert Wilhelm	1969-72
Eustace Theodore	1972-81
Nancy Baker	1981-82
David Spadafora	1982-85
John Godfrey	1985-89
Chris Taylor	1989-91
David Schwartz	1991-93
Stephen Lassonde	1993-2007
Leslie Woodard	2007-13
April Ruiz	2013-18
David Francis	2018-
