= Senator McDowell =

Senator McDowell may refer to:

- Charles S. McDowell (1871–1943), Alabama State Senate
- Charles McDowell (North Carolina militiaman) (1743–1815), North Carolina State Senate
- Harris McDowell Sr. (1859–1927), Delaware State Senate
- Harris McDowell (1906–1988), Delaware State Senate
- Harris McDowell III (born 1940), Delaware State Senate
- John G. McDowell (1794–1866), New York State Senate
- Joseph J. McDowell (1800–1877), Ohio State Senate
- William John McDowell (1861–1929), Northern Irish Senate
