= Ruth Wales du Pont =

American socialite, philanthropist, and composer (1889–1967)

- Born: Ruth Wales; June 10, 1889; Hyde Park, New York, U.S.
- Died: November 7, 1967 (aged 78); Wilmington, Delaware, U.S.
- Resting place: Du Pont de Nemours Cemetery
- Education: Spence School; Peabody Conservatory
- Spouse: Henry Francis du Pont (m. 1916)
- Children: 2, including Ruth du Pont Lord
- Family: Du Pont family

Ruth Wales du Pont (June 10, 1889 – November 7, 1967) was an American socialite, philanthropist, amateur classical composer, and spouse of Henry Francis du Pont, who founded Winterthur Museum, Garden and Library.

== Early life and family ==
Ruth Wales was born in the wealthy New York suburb of Hyde Park on June 10, 1889, the only child of Edward Howe Wales and Ruth Holmes Hawks Wales. Her father was a stockbroker, Theodore Roosevelt aide, US Navy Reserve commodore, and philander who preferred to stay in Washington, D.C. Ruth grew up in Hyde Park with her grandmother and mother, to whom she was very close. Her paternal grandfather was New York City Parks Commissioner Salem Howe Wales, while her maternal uncle by marriage was US Senator Elihu Root. Franklin Delano Roosevelt was her neighbor and later attended her wedding. She boarded at the elite preparatory Miss Spence's School from the age of 12, where she excelled academically.

Vivacious and gregarious, Wales grew up as a socialite who mingled with elite East Coast families and "generally kicked up her heels" at Southampton, Bar Harbor, Watch Hill, Providence, and New York. Every summer she sojourned at the luxury resort village of Southampton on Long Island, where her grandfather, Salem Howe Wales, maintained a lakeside mansion called Ox Pasture. In her early twenties, her father escorted her on a tour of England and France, where she received a tour of the royal stables from Rosa Lewis, a former cook and King Edward VII's mistress, whom Ruth declared "one of the most fascinating women I have ever met." In the same letter, however, she wrote approvingly of the British class structure, which "certainly keeps people in their place . . . no overlapping of the classes."

== Marriage and children ==
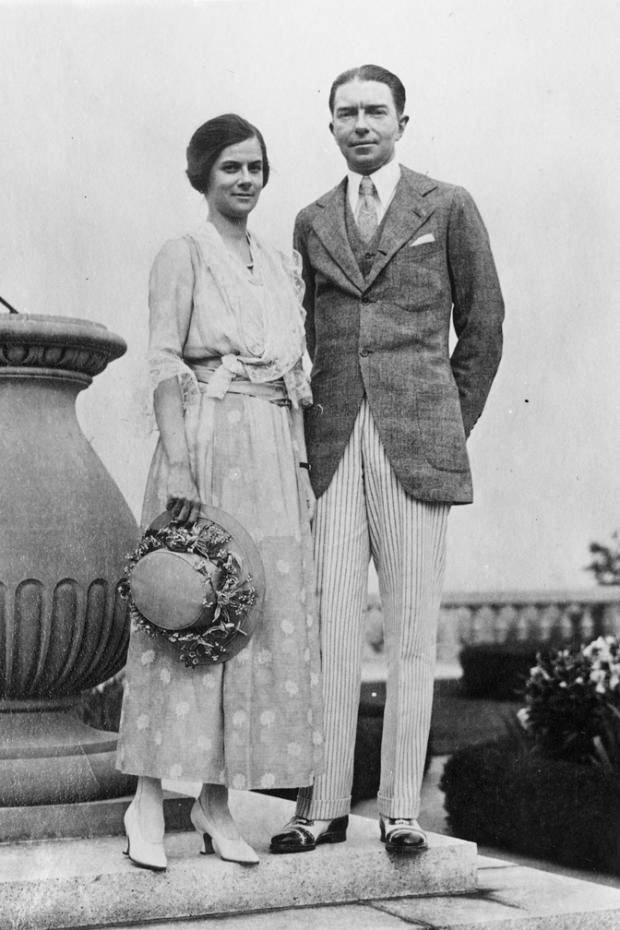
Ruth and Henry du Pont in 1916

In 1916, after a seven-year courtship, she married Henry Francis du Pont (1880–1969). Nine years her elder, H. F. was introverted and socially awkward, happy to spend his days raising cattle, collecting antiques, and running the family estate in Winterthur near Wilmington, Delaware. His beloved mother had died while he was in college, and he had a difficult relationship with his irascible and domineering father, former US senator and colonel Henry Algernon du Pont (1838–1926). After Henry and Ruth married, they lived at Winterthur with the elder du Pont, whose demands included banning divorcées from Winterthur and requiring his granddaughters to speak French in his presence. Ruth's anxiety and insomnia mounted until by 1918 she was taking "nerve medicine." By 1921 she had largely moved out of Winterthur, and in 1924 she took a rest cure at the Austen Riggs Center in Massachusetts.

Despite their distinct personalities and familial challenges, the couple were to all appearances devoted to each other. In contrast to her husband, Ruth had little interest in farming or gardening and preferred to sojourn at their Park Avenue apartment in Manhattan, where she could enjoy New York's society and cultural amenities. Often accompanied by Henry or their daughters, she also stayed at Chestertown House (their summer residence in Southampton) or the family's winter home in Boca Grande, Florida. Ruth deferred most of Winterthur's domestic management, including menus and decor, to her husband, who enjoyed such details.

Henry and Ruth had two daughters, Pauline Louise du Pont Harrison (1918–2007) and Ruth Ellen du Pont Lord (1922–2014). In her memoirs, Ruth Ellen recalled her mother as kind but aloof, rarely lifting or holding the child in her lap. Pauline married New York attorney Alfred C. Harrison. Ruth Ellen married Yale University professor George deForest Lord of New Haven, Connecticut.

== Musical compositions ==
Ruth took piano lessons from the age of 13 and became an amateur classical composer. Even a year into her marriage, she traveled weekly to the Peabody Conservatory in Baltimore, where she studied harmony under famed conductor Gustav Strube. She quit her studies amid the pressures of family life in the 1920s, though she continued to write music and play Winterthur's grand piano to entertain guests. She composed a chorus for a ragtime, one organ sonata, at least one waltz, one berceuse, four dances, fugues (all but one of which she lost at a railway station), and the introduction and first act of an opera she called A New England Romance, based on the novella Ethan Frome by Edith Wharton. Ruth also produced original songs and scores for some of her favorite poems, including Robert Louis Stevenson's "The Night Rider" and "Home from the Hill." Conductor Brian Cox described her as a "significant but forgotten composer" and "one of the few Delaware composers who wrote for the art of it."

Ruth's compositions were publicly performed in various Delaware venues. In 1976, the Christ Church Christiana Hundred held a music festival featuring her pseudo-Baroque "Fugue in G Minor for Organ," performed by Stefan Kozinski. This piece was later recorded for a 1993 album entitled Music from the Banks of the Brandywine, conducted by Brian Cox and mostly consisting of pieces by Alfred I. du Pont. In 1995, the New Tankopanicum Orchestra's concert at Winterthur Museum featured the first public performance of music she composed. In 2014, the Wilmington Community Orchestra, conducted by Brian Cox, held the world premiere of another piece she wrote.

== Personal beliefs ==
Like her husband, Ruth was a staunch Republican who deplored her old friend Franklin Delano Roosevelt's New Deal policies. When her younger daughter vowed to vote for FDR, Ruth was outraged. She considered FDR "a traitor to his class" and in 1936 "made so vitriolic a speech in support of Alfred Landon, the Republican candidate, that one Winterthur resident in the audience said it was sure to gain votes for Roosevelt." Her animosity toward FDR, born perhaps of a personal sense of betrayal by a friend, was little softened by the passage of time. In 1954, Ruth wrote a letter to the Secretary of the Treasury saying she would pay for the recall of all Roosevelt dimes.

Ruth and her husband were Episcopalians who attended Christ Church Christiana Hundred, the du Pont family's traditional house of worship near Winterthur.

== Death and legacy ==
Ruth died on November 7, 1967, at Delaware Division Hospital in Wilmington, where she had been hospitalized since October 12. She was interred in the Du Pont de Nemours Cemetery in Wilmington. Ruth was survived by her husband, both daughters, eight grandchildren, and two grand-grandchildren.

Alexander Ames and Devon Ennis (2019) have argued that "Ruth Wales du Pont is an underrepresented figure in Winterthur’s history as it is shared with visitors today." Apart from her bedroom and the grand piano on which she performed for guests, "her presence is rarely evoked on introductory tours." However, in 2020, an exhibit at Winterthur Museum recounted Ruth's life and featured various objects belonging to her, including her sheet music collection and a recreation of her wedding dress.

In 1961, Ruth and her husband donated land on Captains Neck Lane in Southampton to conservation. The preserve was named the Ruth Wales du Pont Sanctuary.

Ruth was a trustee of the reconstruction of Tryon Palace in New Bern, North Carolina. The mansion had been designed by her ancestor, the architect John Hawks.
