= George Lord (disambiguation) =

George Lord (1818–1880) was an Australian politician.

This name may also refer to:

- George deForest Lord (1919–2012), American academic
- George Edwin Lord (1846–1876), American military surgeon
- George P. Lord (1831–1917), American politician
