= Halfdan Hanson =

American architect

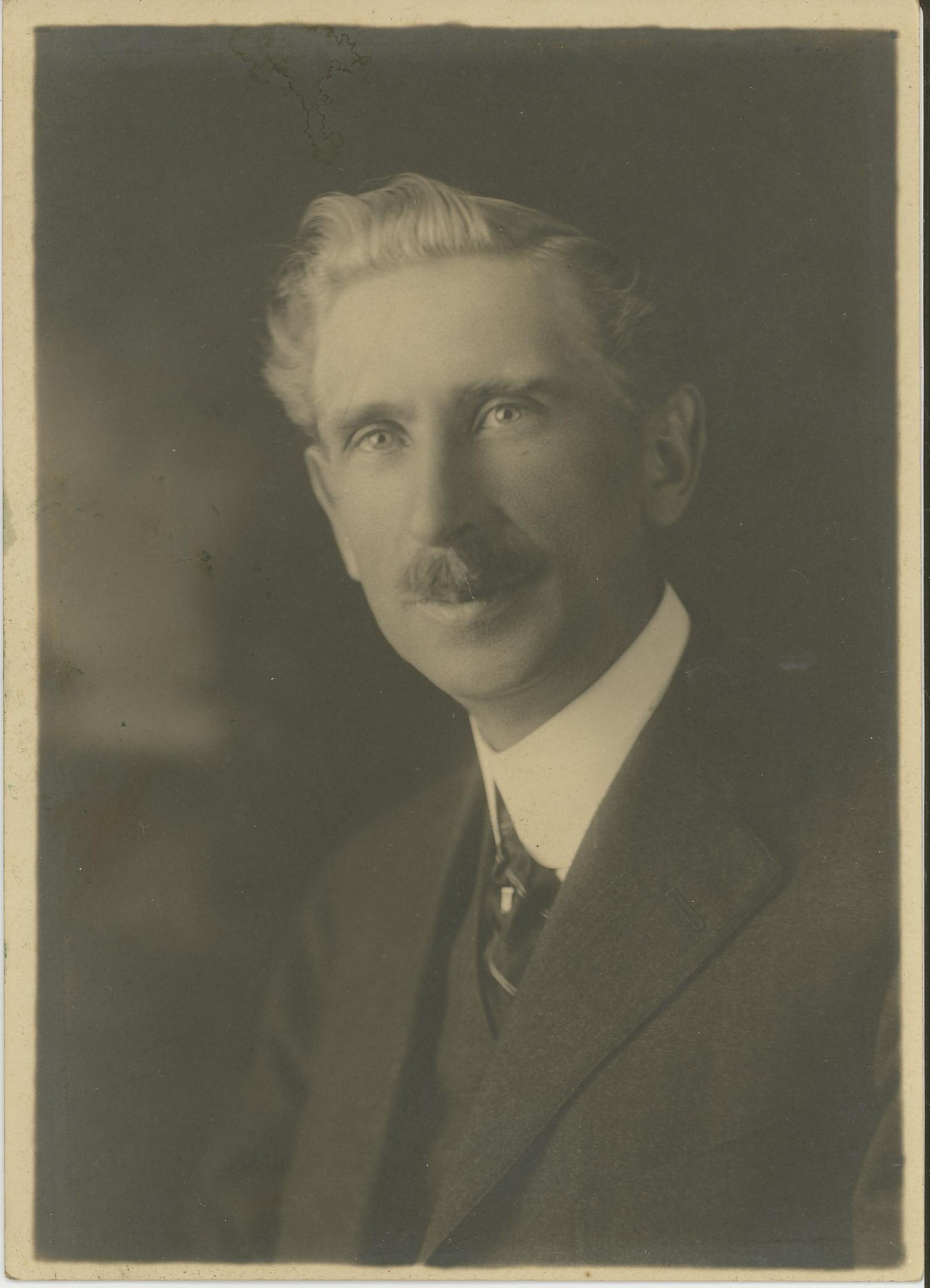
A professional photograph of the architect Halfdan M. Hanson, taken in early 20th century. Exact date unknown.

Halfdan Marinius Hanson (November 30, 1884 – September 12, 1952) was a Norwegian-born American architect.

He was born in Tønsberg in Vestfold, Norway. He emigrated as an infant to Gloucester, Massachusetts, where his father was a ship's rigger. In 1904, he completed a correspondence course in architecture from a program based in Philadelphia, Pennsylvania.

Hanson had a longtime collaboration with interior designer Henry Davis Sleeper, the owner of the Beauport in Gloucester, Massachusetts.

He was an architect in the employment of Sleeper for twenty-seven years. He was also the architect of or contributor to over 100 properties principally within greater Boston area including the communities of Gloucester, Rockport, Manchester, Beverly and Newton. Other notable properties designed by Hanson include Our Lady of Good Voyage Church, which is, along with Beauport, on the National Register of Historic Places.

== Other sources ==
- Bohl, David; Nancy Curtis, Richard C. Nylander, Joseph Garland, Paul Hollister, Philip A. Hayden (1990). Beauport: The Sleeper McCann House (Society for the Preservation of New England Antiquities) ISBN 978-0879238766
- O'Gorman, James F. (Ed.) (2010). Drawing Toward Home: Designs for Domestic Architecture from Historic New England (Tilbury House Publishers) ISBN 978-0884483281
