= Salem Howe Wales =

American politician (1825–1902)

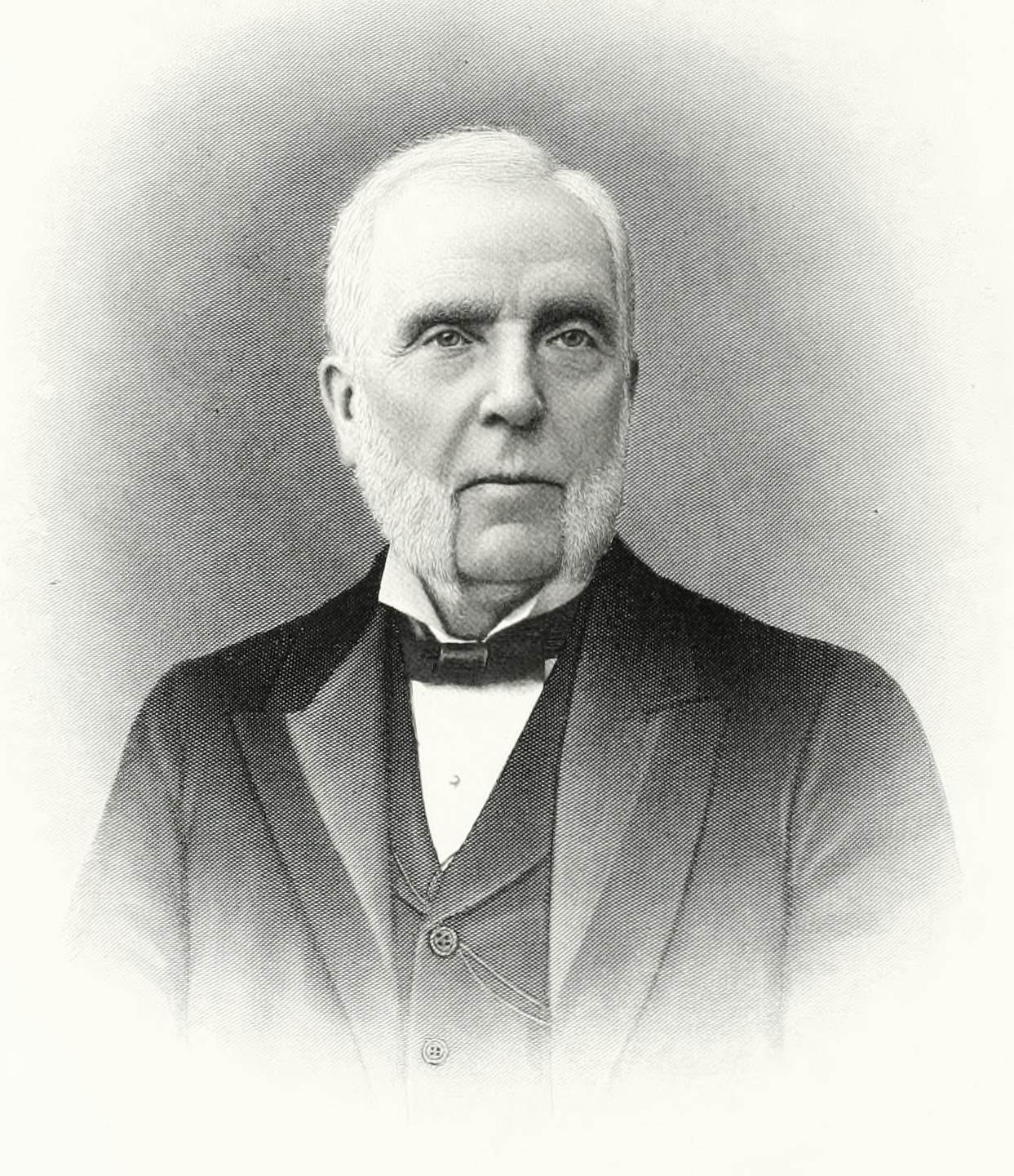
- Born: October 4, 1825; Wales, Massachusetts, US
- Died: December 2, 1902 (aged 77); New York City, US
- Other names: Salem H. Wales
- Occupations: Journalist, politician, philanthropist

Salem Howe Wales (October 4, 1825 – December 2, 1902) was an American journalist, politician, and philanthropist who held various leadership offices in the government of New York City, served as managing editor of the Scientific American, and co-founded the Metropolitan Museum of Art. Wales was father-in-law to U.S. Senator and Secretary of War Elihu Root, who served as President of the Union League of New York, while Wales served as Vice-president.

== Early life and education ==
Wales was born in Wales, Massachusetts, to parents Oliver Wales and Lucy Tiffany. His father was a woolen manufacturer. Wales attended local public schools before moving to New York, where he attended the Academy of Attica and then clerked for a New York City importer from 1846 to 1848. After Massachusetts natives Orson Desaix Munn and Alfred Ely Beach purchased the Scientific American, Wales became its managing editor from 1848 to 1871. He was New York State's commissioner to the Paris Exposition of 1855 and executive committee member of the United States Christian Commission during the Civil War.

== Political career ==
An opponent of Tammany Hall, Wales was appointed president of the New York City Department of Parks when reform-minded Republican mayor William Frederick Havemeyer took office in 1873. After Havemeyer died in office, Wales ran for mayor on the Republican ticket, losing the 1874 general election to Democratic nominee William H. Wickham. Immediately after the election, acting mayor Samuel B. H. Vance appointed Wales president of the New York City Department of Docks, where he served from 1874 to 1876. He returned to the parks department commission from 1880 to 1885, serving as the commission's president for several of those years.

Wales was a delegate to the Republican National Conventions in 1872 and 1876.

== Civic involvement ==
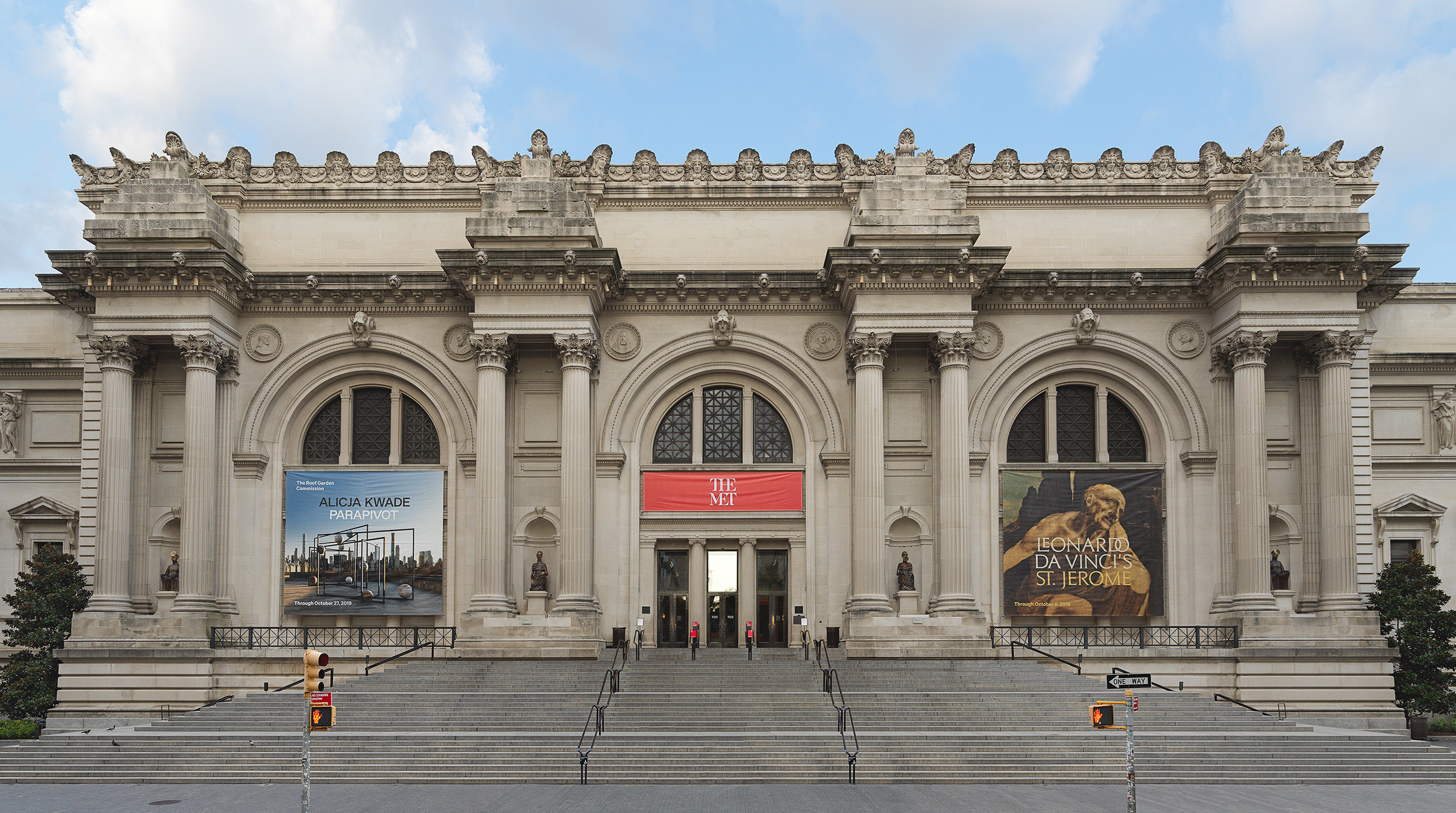
Metropolitan Museum of Art, Central Park, New York

Wales was a co-founder of the Metropolitan Museum of Art and served as treasurer and as a trustee for many years. He was instrumental in the establishment of the Homeopathic Medical College of Pennsylvania and the New York Homeopathic Medical College and served as board presidents for both. Governor John Alden Dix named him to the board of Middletown State Hospital in 1911–12. Wales served on the boards of the National Bank of North America, the Hanover Fire Insurance Company, the Southampton Bank, and the Rogers Memorial Library in Southampton. He also served on the commission that oversaw the building of the East River Bridge.

Eastman Johnson painted Wales' portrait in 1882. The portrait is in the collection of the Union League Club of New York, which Wales served as a vice president and chair of the executive and financial committees for many years. He was one of the men responsible for the construction of the club's current headquarters.

== Personal life ==
Wales married Frances Elizabeth Johnson of Bridgeport, Connecticut, in 1851. They had four children: Edith, Clara Frances, Edward Howe, and Joseph Howe. In 1878, Clara married Elihu Root, Secretary of State, and President and Chairman of many foundations for Andrew Carnegie. Edward's daughter, Ruth Wales, married horticulturist and collector Henry Francis du Pont in 1916, a member of the du Pont family.
