= R. Inslee Clark Jr. =

Russell Inslee "Inky" Clark Jr. (1935 – August 3, 1999) was an educator, administrator, and a key player in the transition of the Ivy League into co-education in the 1960s and diversified student bodies to the present from the 1960s.

== Personal life ==
Clark was born in 1935 and graduated from Garden City High School in 1953. Clark graduated from Yale College in 1957 where he was a member of Skull and Bones. Clark earned a master's degree from the Maxwell School of Citizenship and Public Affairs at Syracuse University.

== Career ==
As Director of Undergraduate Admissions (1965-1969) at Yale University, Clark oversaw the school's transition to a coeducational admission policy, and shares credit with Yale President Kingman Brewster for establishing academic credentials in the admissions process. Clark was academic dean at Trumbull College, one of the twelve residential colleges constituent to Yale College, 1963 - 1965.

For decades prestigious northeastern colleges had used "character" as a code word to limit the number of acceptances afforded to secondary school students with Jewish and working class Catholic backgrounds to colleges traditionally defined by an Episcopalian or WASP social standard. Negroes were invisible on campus.

Associated with this move, Yale, followed by other prestigious colleges in the northeast section of the United States, recruited for the first time beyond the prep school orbit of New England and mid-Atlantic boarding schools, and private schools in New York City, Boston, Philadelphia, Baltimore, and Washington, D.C. This new policy is now a standard in their respective admissions practices.

Headmaster and President (1970-1991) of the Horace Mann School in the Bronx, New York, Clark reintroduced co-education and oversaw the school's merger with the Barnard School. His obituary, published August 7, 1999 in The New York Times, read: "a brilliant, dynamic teacher, he taught an Urban History course and took students into prisons and courtrooms to learn first hand about the complex urban issues confronting New York City. His inspirational leadership, his ebullient personality...His impressive intellect and passion for baseball are legendary."

== Horace Mann School pedophilia scandal ==
A cover feature was published in The New York Times Sunday magazine, datelined 6 June 2012, that reports on many years that faculty members practiced pedophilia among the Horace Mann School student body while Clark was Headmaster and President. Clark was described as one of many teachers and administrators implicated in the criminal behavior and resultant coverup. Clark is acknowledged as a member of the cohort of homosexual and heterosexual pedophiles described in the resultant legal proceedings.

In March 2013, the school, with legal and other counsel, settled many claims brought by victims of sexual abuse during many of the years Clark was associated with Horace Mann School. The New Yorker, datelined April 1, 2013, presented further reportage on pedophilia at Horace Mann School during Clark's tenure. The feature was authored by Marc Fisher, an alumnus of Horace Mann School.

== Bibliography ==
- "Paid Notice: Deaths CLARK, R. INSLEE, JR". The New York Times. August 7, 1999.
- New York Times Magazine Section: Prep School Predators, Amos Kamil, June 6, 2013
- New Yorker Magazine: The Master, Marc Fisher, March 25, 2013, online
