= Trumbull College =

Residential college at Yale University

- Residential college at Yale University
- Coat of arms of Trumbull College
- Location: 241 Elm Street; New Haven, Connecticut 06511
- Nickname: Trumbullians; bulls
- Motto: Fortuna favet audaci (Latin)
- Motto in English: Fortune favors the brave
- Established: 1933
- Named for: Jonathan Trumbull
- Colors: Maroon and gold
- Sister college: Cabot House, Harvard
- Head: Fahmeed Hyder
- Dean: Surjit Chandhoke
- Undergraduates: 407 (2016-2017)
- Mascot: Bull

Trumbull College is one of fourteen undergraduate residential colleges of Yale University in New Haven, Connecticut, United States. The college is named for Jonathan Trumbull, governor of Connecticut from 1769 to 1784 and advisor and friend to General George Washington. A Harvard College graduate, Trumbull was the only colonial governor to support the American Revolution.

Opened in September 1933, Trumbull College is one of the eight Yale colleges designed by James Gamble Rogers and the only one funded by John W. Sterling. Its Collegiate Gothic buildings form the Sterling Quadrangle, which Rogers planned to harmonize with his adjacent Sterling Memorial Library.

== History ==
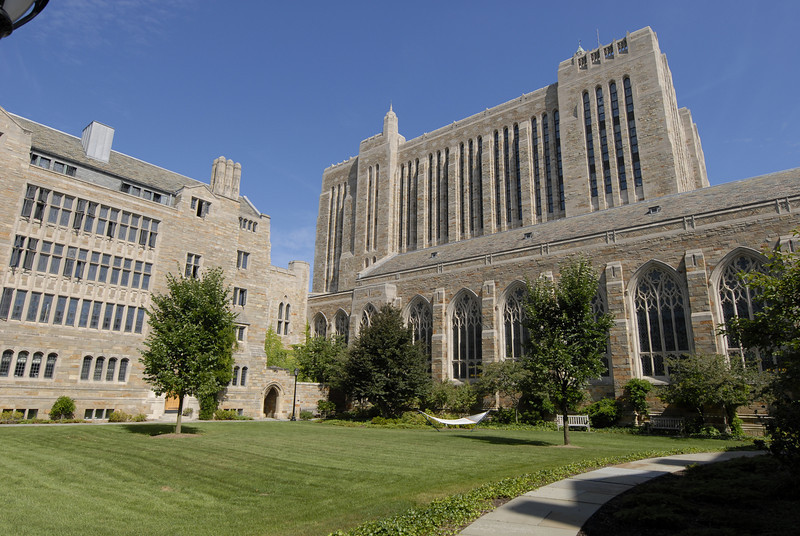
Main courtyard of Trumbull, with Sterling Library at back

Trumbull is one of the University's nine original colleges. Unlike the other eight colleges, which were funded and endowed by Edward Harkness, funds for Trumbull came from university benefactor John W. Sterling. Yale originally planned to name the college after John C. Calhoun, a Yale graduate, U.S. vice president, and secessionist. In deference to Sterling being a Civil War veteran from Connecticut, the university agreed to name the college after Jonathan Trumbull and gave the name Calhoun to another residential college (now re-named Hopper College).

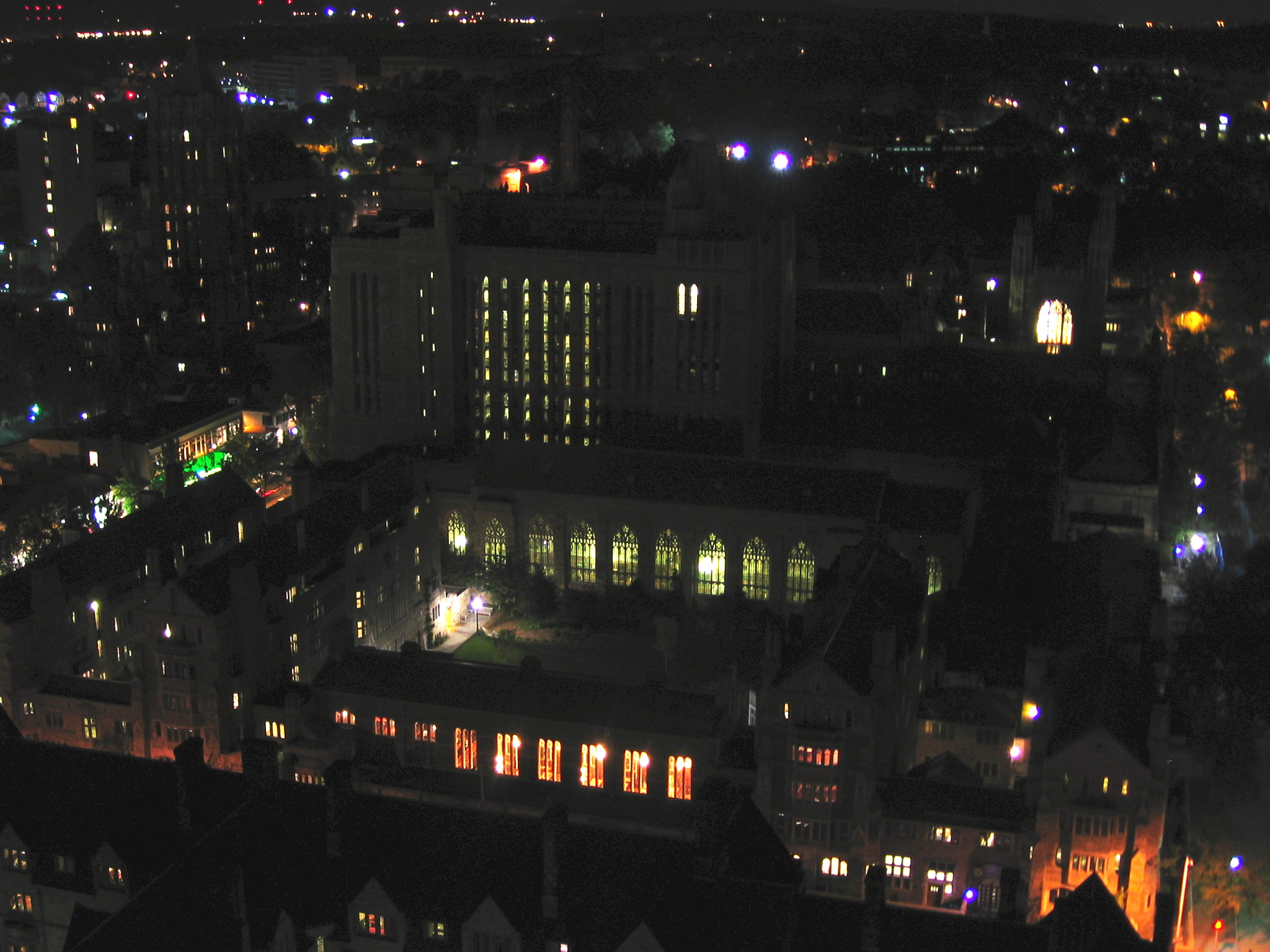
Trumbull College by night, as seen from Harkness Tower. The College spans the entire block shown, with Sterling Memorial Library forming the far side. The courtyards, from left to right, are Potty Court, Main Court, and Stone Court.

Before University President James Rowland Angell instituted the residential college system in 1931, the site that was to become Trumbull contained two free-standing dormitory buildings flanking the old gymnasium. James Gamble Rogers, architect of eight of Yale's colleges, considered the dormitories to be his magnum opus and inscribed the initials of the men who worked on the project on shield carvings along the outside of the buildings. The buildings are modeled after King's College, Cambridge.

The gym was torn down and the dormitories connected with a new building in the Collegiate Gothic style. The new building contained the Trumbull dining hall, common room, and library. A new dorm wing was constructed parallel to the originals and a faculty member's house (first known as the Master's House and since April 2016 as the Head of College House) was added. With the Sterling Memorial Library to the north, the buildings formed the Sterling Quadrangle. The buildings split the quadrangle into three separate courtyards — Alvarez (Main) Court, Potty Court, and Stone Court.

Although the construction techniques were modern, Rogers went to lengths to make the buildings appear centuries old. He had workers distress stone walls with acid. They intentionally broke some of the leaded glass windows and then repaired them with extra leading in the medieval fashion. They created niches for statuary and left them empty, as if the statues had been lost or destroyed over time. They varied the carving techniques used on the exterior stone, to suggest to the practiced eye that the work had been done by different carvers over many years.

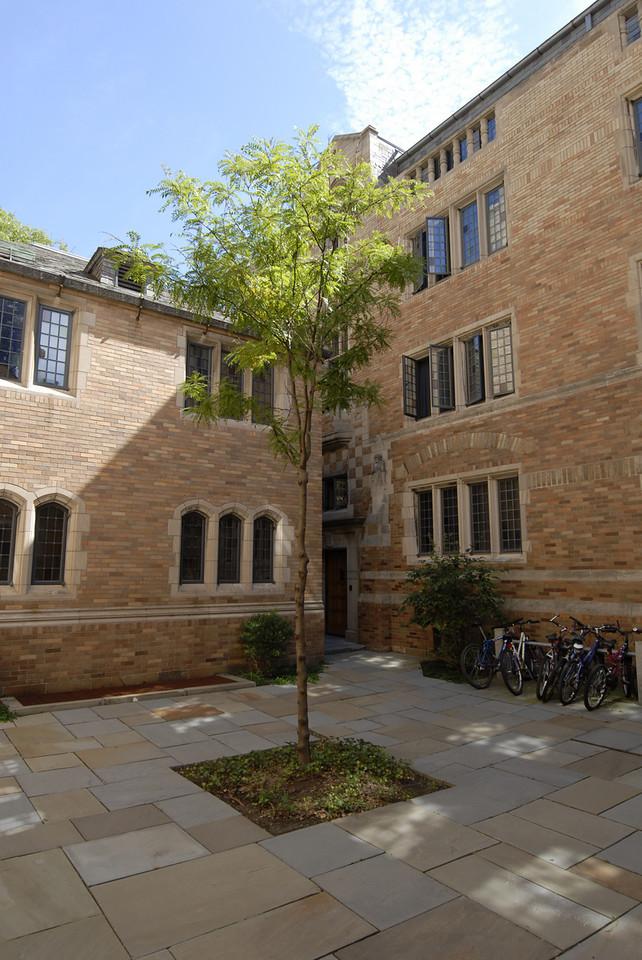
Stone Courtyard, Trumbull College

Each residential college was to be headed by a senior faculty member serving as college master. The university chose the first masters to reflect a diverse range of disciplines. President Angell, a psychologist, was especially keen to have a scientist among them. He recruited Stanhope Bayne-Jones, a Yale College graduate and Dean of University of Rochester Medical School, to come to Yale as Trumbull's first master.

Because Trumbull was pieced together using existing buildings, and on a small area of land, its original student rooms were older and amenities were less generous than those of some of its sister colleges. (The college has since been renovated and upgraded.) Still, the college's first faculty and students put the space to some creative uses. For example, Clements Fry, pioneering psychiatrist in the Department of University Health, opened a counseling office in a fourth-floor room off Stone Court. Students found space to put on plays and publish a college magazine.

During World War II, Yale turned much of its campus over to the military for training. By 1943 Trumbull was one of only three colleges that continued to house undergraduates (Timothy Dwight and Jonathan Edwards were the others).

In the first two decades of Yale's residential college system, students would apply for entry to their choice of college at the end of their freshman year. Although the university sought to give each college a diverse population, the colleges acquired reputations. Freshmen from wealthy families with social connections tended to shun Trumbull. As one chronicler of the university's history noted, "Calhoun and Davenport were strongly athletic and ‘white shoe,’ only engineers (it was whispered) congregated in Silliman and Timothy Dwight, and no one knew who lived in Trumbull." In other words, Trumbull maintained a reputation for housing serious students, many of whom were on scholarships. Some called Trumbull "the bursar's college." To overcome these social differences, the university began assigning most students to colleges randomly — beginning in 1954 at the end of the student's freshman year, and beginning in 1962 upon admission to Yale.

In 1968, Yale President Kingman Brewster announced a plan for admitting women to Yale and proposed that Trumbull be turned into housing for freshman women. Brewster held a "stormy" meeting with Trumbull students, who would have been forced to vacate their college. In response to the protest, Brewster changed his plan and reserved one of the Old Campus dormitories for women. The Trumbull College Council passed a motion "vigorously endorsing with rampant enthusiasm" the revised proposal.

Renovations near completion in August 2006, as seen from Sterling Memorial Library.

Helen Brown Nicholas, wife of former Trumbull Master John Spangler Nicholas, died in 1972 and left the college a bequest to fund building of a chapel. Yale architecture professor Herbert Newman and his students designed the chapel, modifying an existing squash court in the Trumbull basement. It was dedicated in 1974. Frequently used as a theater, "Nick" Chapel remains in high demand by Yale students of all colleges.

The college was extensively remodeled during the 2005–2006 academic year, thanks in part to donations from the Alvarez family. All dorm rooms and bathrooms were renovated, and the dining hall kitchen and the activity areas in the basement received comprehensive upgrades and modernization.

== Student life ==
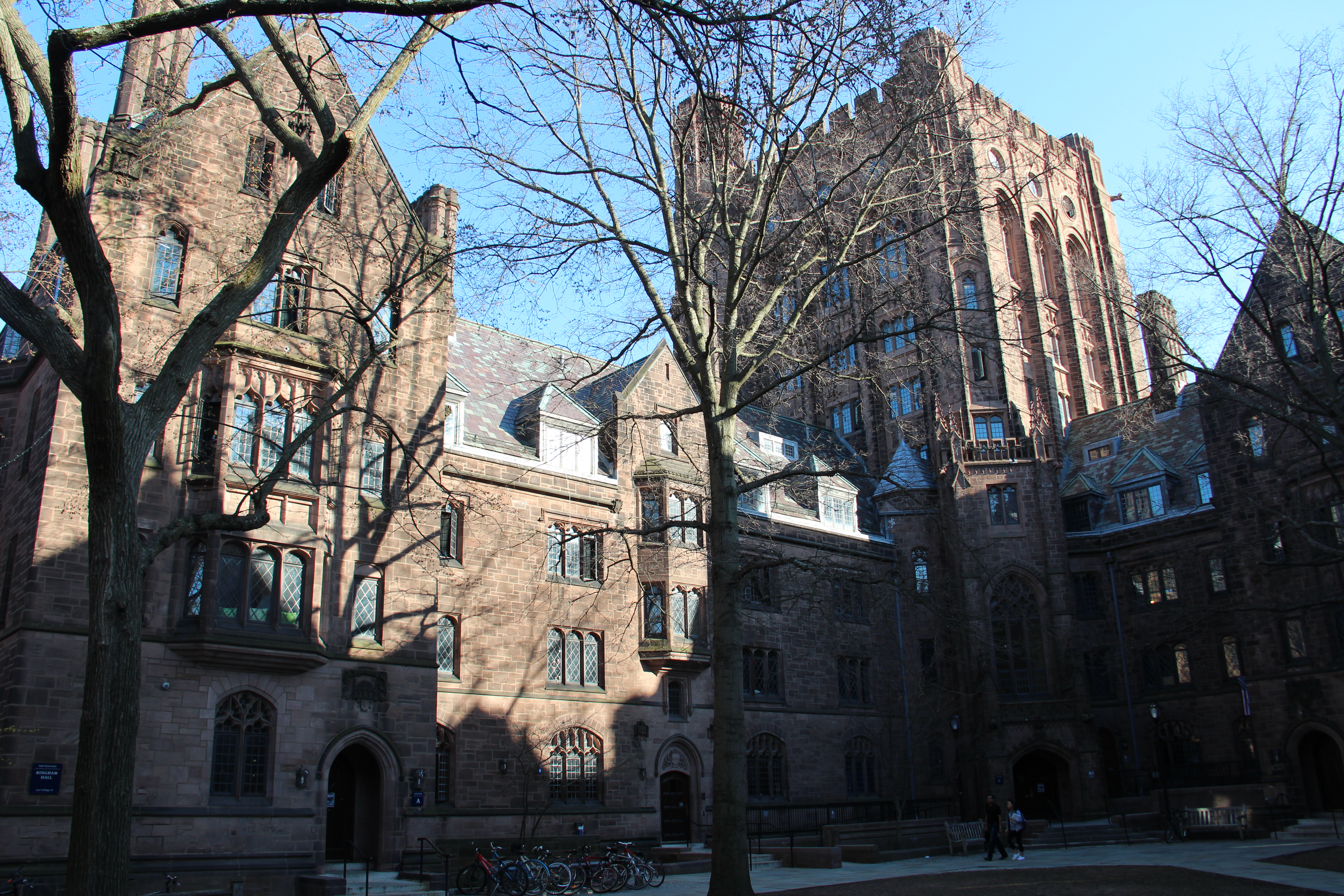
Bingham Hall, Trumbull's freshman residence, from the Old Campus courtyard

Trumbull freshmen are housed in Bingham Hall along with students from Grace Hopper College. The dormitory's location on the southern corner of the Old Campus is site of the College House, Yale's first building in New Haven, and Osborn Hall, demolished in 1926 for Bingham Hall's construction. It is the only freshman dormitory with elevator access and contains a comparative literature library on its eighth story.

Trumbull College itself includes three courtyards, a buttery, dance studio, student kitchen, TV room, theatre, seminar room, art gallery, art studio, pottery studio, gym, music room, common room, computer rooms, library, dining hall, billiards and ping pong areas as well as a Head of College's House where many social activities are held.

Trumbull is the smallest of Yale's residential colleges, both in terms of students affiliated with the college and students housed in the college.

== Faculty leaders ==
- Fahmeed Hyder, professor of biomedical engineering at the Yale School of Engineering & Applied Science and professor of radiology and biomedical imaging at the Yale School of Medicine, was appointed to a five-year term as Head of College, beginning on July 1, 2023. Hyder's wife, Anita Sharif-Hyder, Associate Secretary for the University-Wide Committee on Sexual Misconduct, serves as Associate Head of College.
- Surjit Chandhoke, lecturer and research scientist in the Molecular Cellular and Developmental Biology Department, is Dean of Trumbull College, living in the college and tracking students' academic progress as well as joining in many social activities. Before coming to Trumbull, she had been a long-term advisor to biology students.
- Jorge Anaya (Assistant Director of Student Engagement at the Yale College Dean's Office), and Nils Rudi and Teresa Chahine (both professors at the Yale School of Management) are residential fellows in the college and often join students in activities.

== College traditions ==
- The phrase "We must consult Brother Jonathan" appears on the graduation certificates of the college.

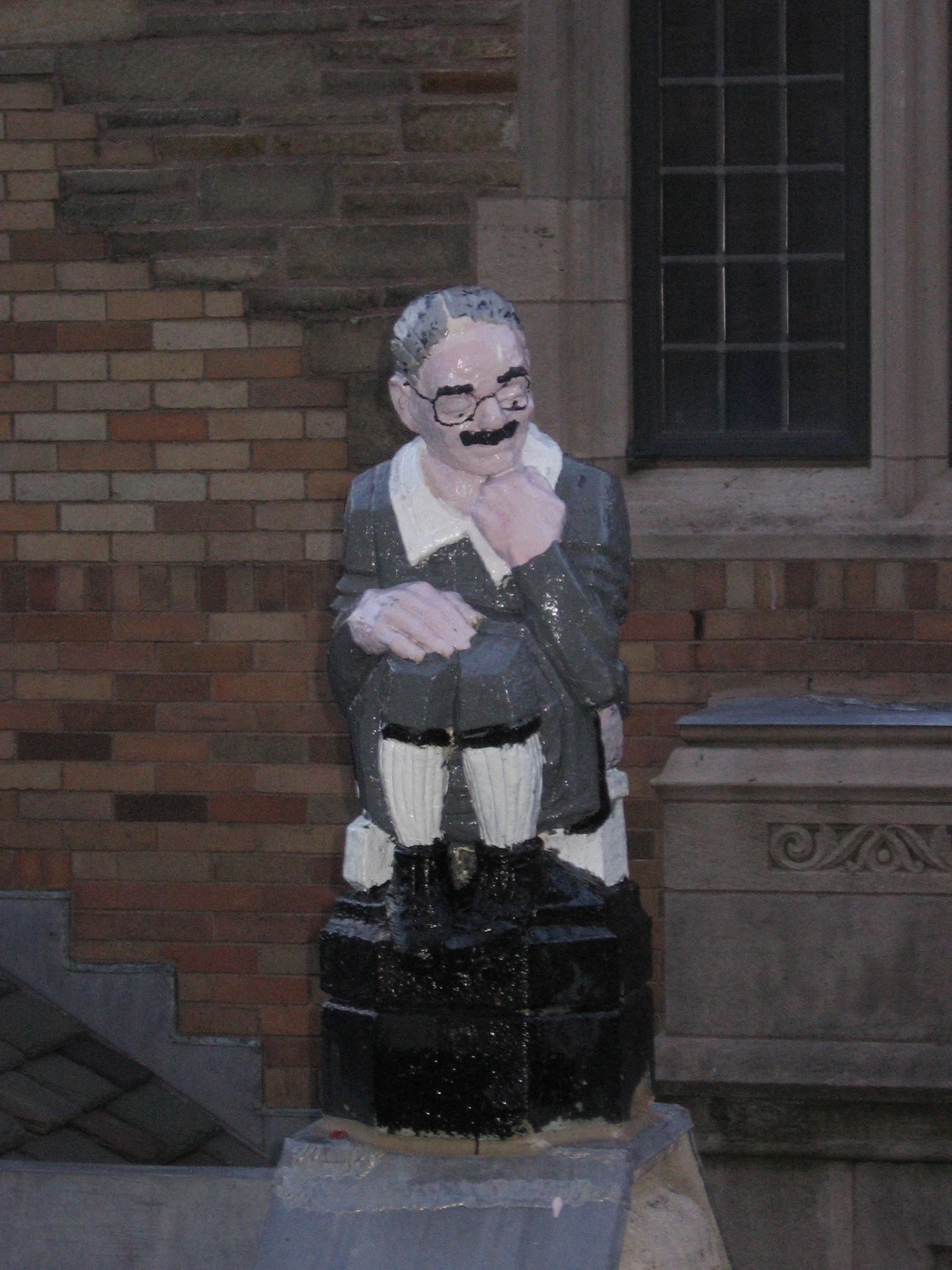
The Trumbull College Potty Court statue painted as Peter Salovey.

- Cornhole is a game in which teams throw a series of four bean-bags across to the other team's board, scoring 1 point for each that remains on the board, 3 points if it falls through a hole in the middle. After both teams have gone, the difference between their points is taken, and that difference is awarded to the winning team. Trumbull's cornhole games appear during its Fall Rumble in Trumbull festival as well as in the spring during its Pamplona event.
- The Trumbulletin was Trumbull's tabloid magazine and the oldest residential college publication at Yale. The tradition continues in a reduced electronic form as weekly dispatches from the head of college.
- Rumble in Trumbull: Trumbullians combat with massive foam gloves. Favorite past Rumbles include Jews vs. Gentiles and various competitions among suites. Good things to eat and many games appear during Rumble in Trumbull.
- Pamplona: Trumbullians celebrate the end of spring classes with food, music, competitions, and the Running of the Bulls.
- Running of the Bulls is a raucous run through Cross Campus and Trumbull's traditional rival college, neighboring Berkeley. It usually occurs on the day of Pamplona.
- Trumbull seniors annually paint the Potty Court Statue before graduation. The class of 2008 painted the statue to look like then-Yale College Dean Peter Salovey (who went on to serve as Yale's president from 2013 to 2024). The class of 2014 painted it to look like Harold, a golden retriever and former Trumdog who loved students.

== Past traditions ==
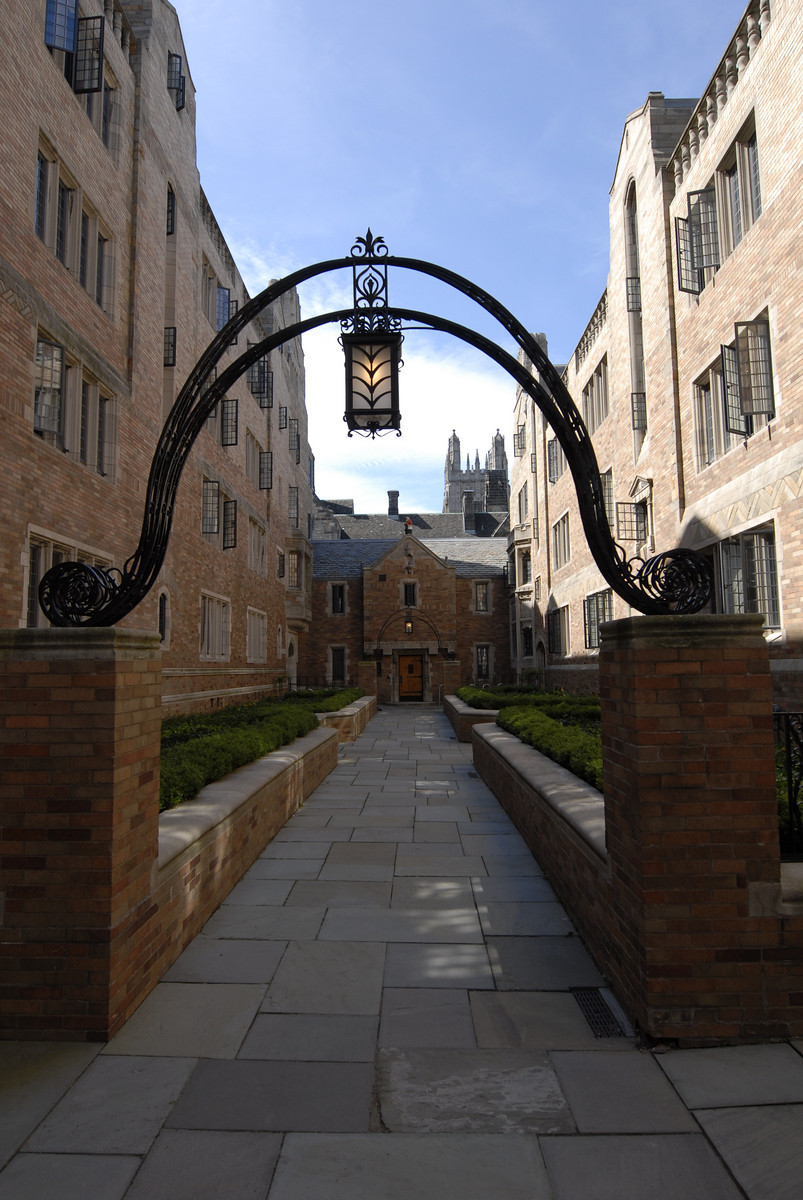
Potty Court of Trumbull College, Yale University

- Potty Court Frisbee was a game popular in the 1970s and 1980s played in the Potty Court by two teams of two players each. The general idea was to stand on the low stone wall next to the wrought iron arch at one end of the courtyard and throw a frisbee through the twin arch at the other end, while the other team's two players tried to stop it. Defenders could stand on and lean out from the low stone wall, and could hang from the arch, but could not touch the walkway under the arch. The throws alternated between the teams.

A throw that went through the arch above the level of the stone wall scored one point. A throw that went through one of the two narrow gaps at the top of the arch's ironwork was a "grundl" and scored two points. To discourage defenders from committing to defense of the arch before the opponent threw, the thrower could also score a point for a shot that hit the wrought iron fencing next to the arch, but a "fence shot" had to hit the fence on the fly or off a wall, while a shot through the arch was allowed to bounce off the ground. The first team to get seven points won. Other than the frisbee, no equipment was required, although some players wore leather gloves to protect their hands from the wrought iron.

- The Beer and Bicycle Race was a team biathlon event from the 1950s and '60s, briefly revived in the '70s. The first race, in 1952, staged by the Trumbull Beer and Bike Society, was an over 70-mile relay from Trumbull to Vassar College. Riders had to consume a quart of beer before passing the baton to the next member of their team (although some sources suggest the beer had to be consumed before riding). Prizes were awarded for fastest times and best rider costumes. The annual April event became the center of press attention, partying, and celebration, and grew to the point that authorities at Vassar banned it in 1957. It continued for a while with a new destination, Connecticut College. In 1964, Trumbull ran it on a 45-mile course through nearby towns, ending back at the Yale Bowl. It seems to have faded away after that, although Trumbull re-staged it for a few years in the 1970s as a double round-trip race between Trumbull and Sleeping Giant State Park.
- The Trumbull Crier, during the 1990s, was a student who made announcements during dinner from the balcony of the college dining hall. The Crier would begin the announcements with, "Moo-ye, Moo-ye, it's six o'clock in Trumbull College, and all is well!" The first Trumbull Crier was Jeremy Monthy (Class of 1995), who came up with the concept. He made and wore a tricorn hat fitted with bull horns.

== Heads and Deans ==
#	Heads	Term	Dean	Term
1	Stanhope Bayne-Jones	1932–1938	Russell Inslee Clark Jr.	1963–1965
2	Charles Hyde Warren	1938–1945	Edwin Storer Redkey	1965–1968
3	John Spangler Nicholas	1945–1963	Paul Terry Magee	1968–1971
4	George deForest Lord	1963–1966	W. Scott Long	1971–1974
5	Ronald Myles Dworkin	1966–1969	C. M. Long (acting)	1974–1975
6	Kai Theodor Erikson	1969–1973	W. Scott Long	1975–1978
7	Robert John Fogelin	1973–1976	Robert A. Jaeger	1978–1982
8	Robert A. Jaeger (acting)	1976–1977	Mary Ramsbottom	1982–1986
9	Michael George Cooke	1977–1982	Peter B. MacKeith	1986–1990
10	Frank William Kenneth Firk	1982–1987	William Di Canzio	1990–1998
11	Harry B. Adams	1987–1997	Peter Novak	1998–2001
12	Janet B. Henrich	1997–2002	Laura King	2001–2004
13	Frederick J. Streets (acting)	2002–2003	Jasmina Beširević-Regan	2004–2016
14	Janet B. Henrich	2003–2013		
15	Margaret S. Clark	2013–2023	Surjit Chandhoke	2016– present
16	Fahmeed Hyder	2023–present		

== Notable alumni ==
Note: Records of the residential colleges of which graduates of Yale College were members are incomplete and not readily available.

- Les Aspin (1960, History, the Arts, and Letters), United States Representative and Secretary of Defense
- Chesa Boudin (2003), leftist lawyer, San Francisco District Attorney
- Stephen Budiansky (1978, Chemistry), writer
- Susan Bysiewicz (1983, Scholars of the House), Lt. Governor of Connecticut, Secretary of State of Connecticut
- Ashton Carter (1976, Physics and History), Secretary of Defense
- George Chauncey (1977, History) LGBT historian
- Anderson Cooper (1989, Political Science), award-winning journalist and anchor of CNN's Anderson Cooper 360°
- Charles Duhigg (1997, History), New York Times reporter and author
- Austan Goolsbee (1991, Economics), economist, president of the Federal Reserve Bank of Chicago, former chair of the Council of Economic Advisers to President Barack Obama
- William Hamilton (1962, English), cartoonist and writer
- John Hersey (1936), Pulitzer Prize-winning author; Master of Pierson College, 1965–1970
- Sharon Isbin (1978, Music), classical guitarist
- Larry Kelley (1937), professional football player, winner of the Heisman Trophy in 1936
- Michael Kimmelman (1980, History), author and journalist.
- Min Jin Lee (1990, History) author of Pachinko (novel).
- Ron Livingston (1989, Theater Studies and Literature), actor
- Ian McCutcheon (1978, Chemistry), author, neurosurgeon
- Dana Milbank (1990, Political Science), political journalist
- David Milch (1966, English), screenwriter, television producer
- Wesley Morris (1997), 2012 Pulitzer Prize-winning film critic for the Boston Globe and former Trumbull Crier
- ZZ Packer (1994) award-winning author
- Carl Posy (1966), Israeli philosopher
- Philip Proctor (1962), actor, comedian, member of the Firesign Theater
- Kevin P. Ryan (1985), investor and entrepreneur
- Benno C. Schmidt Jr. (1963), legal scholar, educator, 16th president of Yale University, 1986–1992
- Jack Schlossberg (2015, History), American writer, John F. Kennedy's only grandson
- Allison Silverman (1994, Humanities), writer for The Daily Show and The Colbert Report
- Ted Tally (1974, Drama), playwright, Academy Award-winning screenwriter
- Ray Thornton (1950, Political Science), congressman, university president, and state supreme court justice
