= Hal Haskell =

American businessman and politician (1921–2020)

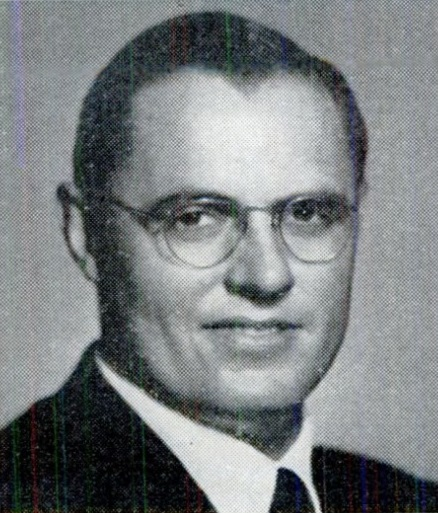
- Haskell in 1957

Mayor of Wilmington, Delaware
- In office January 7, 1969 – January 9, 1973
- Preceded by: John E. Babiarz Sr.
- Succeeded by: Thomas C. Maloney

Member of the U.S. House of Representatives from Delaware's at-large district
- In office January 3, 1957 – January 3, 1959
- Preceded by: Harris McDowell
- Succeeded by: Harris McDowell

Personal details
- Born: Harry Garner Haskell Jr. May 27, 1921 Wilmington, Delaware, U.S.
- Died: January 16, 2020 (aged 98) Chadds Ford, Pennsylvania, U.S.
- Party: Republican
- Spouse: Mary "Mimi" Carey (née Foster) Haskell (m. 1947; died 2008)
- Domestic partner: Ruth du Pont Lord (2009–2014; her death)
- Education: Princeton University
- Occupation: Businessman

Military service
- Allegiance: United States
- Branch/service: United States Coast Guard
- Years of service: 1943–1946
- Rank: Lieutenant
- Battles/wars: World War II

Harry Garner "Hal" Haskell Jr. (May 27, 1921 – January 16, 2020) was an American businessman and Republican politician from Delaware who served as a member of the United States House of Representatives from 1957 to 1959 and as mayor of Wilmington, Delaware from 1969 to 1973. He was a member of the Republican Party.

== Early life ==
Haskell was born in Wilmington, Delaware, the son of Elizabeth (Denham) and Harry Garner Haskell, a DuPont executive. He was educated at Tower Hill School in Wilmington, and St. Mark's School in Southborough, Massachusetts. He attended Princeton University from 1940 until 1942 when he enlisted in the United States Coast Guard Reserve. He was made an ensign in 1943 and was discharged as a lieutenant (junior grade) in 1946.

== Career ==
Haskell was the personnel manager of Speakman Co. in 1947 and 1948, and president of Greenhill Dairies, Inc., from 1948 until 1953, and then owner and operator of Hill Girt Farm in Chadds Ford, Pennsylvania. He was secretary of the Departmental Council of the United States Department of Health, Education, and Welfare in 1953 and 1954, consultant to the special assistant to U.S. President Dwight D. Eisenhower in 1955, and president of the University of Delaware Research Foundation.

Haskell was a delegate to the Republican National Conventions from 1952 until 1984 and was elected to the U.S. House of Representatives in 1956, defeating incumbent Democratic U.S. Representative Harris McDowell. Haskell voted in favor of the Civil Rights Act of 1957. He served in the Republican minority in the 85th Congress but lost his bid for a second term in 1958 to McDowell. Haskell served from January 3, 1957, until January 3, 1959, during the administration of U.S. President Dwight D. Eisenhower. He was elected mayor of Wilmington, Delaware, in 1969, serving one term until 1973, the most recent Republican to serve as mayor of Wilmington.

In 1970, he was appointed a member of the President's National Reading Council and was president of Abercrombie and Fitch. He also worked with Computer International, Computer Time Sharing, Inertial Motors Corps, and Interpoint Corp.

== Advocacy ==
He was a founding member of the Brandywine River Museum and Conservancy in Chadds Ford and served on the board for over fifty years. He was also instrumental in creating two empowerment and mentor groups, in Worcester, Massachusetts and Wilmington Delaware; Dynamy and Delaware Futures, respectively.

== Personal life ==
On January 16, 2020, Haskell died in his home in Chadds Ford, age 98. At the time of his death he had eight children, nineteen grandchildren and eleven great-grandchildren.

== Electoral history ==
Election results
Year	Office	Subject	Party	Votes	%	Opponent	Party	Votes	%
1956	U.S. Representative	Hal Haskell	Republican	91,538	52%	Harris McDowell	Democratic	84,644	48%
1958	U.S. Representative	Hal Haskell	Republican	76,099	50%	Harris McDowell	Democratic	76,797	50%
1968	Mayor of Wilmington	Hal Haskell	Republican			John E. Babiarz	Democratic		

U.S. House of Representatives
Preceded by Harris McDowell	Member of the U.S. House of Representatives from Delaware's at-large congressional district January 3, 1957 – January 3, 1959	Succeeded by Harris McDowell
Honorary titles
Preceded by John Dingell	Most Senior Living U.S. Representative; Sitting or Former; 2019–2020; Served alongside: William Broomfield (2019), Merwin Coad	Succeeded by Merwin Coad
