= Ruth du Pont Lord =

American writer, psychotherapist and philanthropist (1922–2014)

- Born: Ruth Ellen du Pont; January 14, 1922; New York City, U.S.
- Died: August 4, 2014 (aged 92); New Haven, Connecticut, U.S.
- Education: Vassar College (AB); Yale University (MEd)
- Occupations: Writer; psychotherapist; philanthropist
- Spouses: George deForest Lord (m. 1947; div. 1977); John Grier Holmes (m. 1981; died 1997)
- Partner: Harry G. Haskell Jr. (2009‍–‍2014)
- Parents: Henry Francis du Pont; Ruth Wales du Pont

Ruth Ellen du Pont Lord (January 14, 1922 – August 4, 2014) was an American writer, psychotherapist, philanthropist, and patron of the arts. Long active in the Yale and New Haven communities, she co-founded Long Wharf Theatre in 1965 and worked at Yale Child Study Center, specializing in psychotherapy and coauthoring a book about foster care. The last private resident of the Winterthur Museum, Garden and Library, she also wrote a biography of her father, Henry Francis du Pont.

== Early life and education ==
Ruth Ellen du Pont was born on January 14, 1922, in New York City, one of two daughters of Ruth Wales and Henry Francis du Pont. Her older sister was Pauline Louise du Pont (1918–2007). She grew up in Winterthur, Delaware; Boca Grande, Florida; and New York City. She attended Miss Chapin's School in New York and graduated from Foxcroft School in Virginia.

Lord grew up in an era where wealthy women were generally expected not to go to college but rather to focus on obtaining a suitable husband and then raising a family. She was hesitant to ask her father to attend college, but he acquiesced. She attended Vassar College, where she graduated valedictorian of the class of 1943. She later received a master's degree in education from Yale University.

== Career and writing ==
Lord helped found the Long Wharf Theatre in New Haven in 1964. She became deeply involved with the theater's founding after William Sloane Coffin introduce her to other Yale graduates who were interested in starting a local theater (Harlan Kleiman, Jon Jory, Newt Schenck, and Betty Kubler). Lord served as president of the board of the Long Wharf Theatre from 1964 to 1990.

She began working at Yale New Haven Hospital in 1970. She later became a research associate at the Yale Child Study Center, where she focused on child custody issues. At Yale, she performed a variety of roles, including co-leading support groups for parents of severely ill children. She also wrote papers on various topics, including a teenage girl's right to refuse dialysis and the effect on patients when their psychoanalysts die. She collaborated with Yale psychiatry professor Albert J. Solnit and Barbara Nordhaus to author a book on foster child placement issues, which was published by Yale University Press in 1992.

Lord wrote a well-received biography of her father that was published in 1999, when she was 77. Reviewers praised her blend of "tart wit, honest introspection and filial concern" and called it "a delightful as well as thoroughly well documented book." At the time of her death, she was working on a biography of her mother.

== Winterthur estate ==
Lord was the last private resident of the Winterthur Museum, Garden and Library, a 175-room mansion and large estate that her father, Henry Francis du Pont, developed to house his collection of American decorative arts, breed cattle, and cultivate gardens. Winterthur became a public museum and grounds in 1951. As had long been her preference, Lord maintained a smaller residence called Golf Cottage on the estate (along with residences in New Haven, New York, and Florida).

== Personal life ==
In 1947, she married Yale English literature professor George deForest Lord. The couple divorced in 1977. They had four children: Pauline, George (Woody), Henry, and Edith, who died in infancy in 1954. She was married to John Grier Holmes, theatre producer and former chief of the Yale Whiffenpoofs, from 1981 until his death in 1997.

Lord and former Wilmington mayor and US representative Harry G. Haskell Jr. became "partners for life" in 2009 until her death in 2014. The two had been childhood friends but did not meet again until both were in their 80s. Their commitment ceremony included only themselves and two ministers.

Lord died of a stroke in New Haven in 2014 at the age of 92. She was buried in the Du Pont de Nemours Cemetery.

== Publications ==
- Lord, Ruth (1999). Henry F. du Pont and Winterthur: A Daughter's Portrait. New Haven, CT: Yale University Press. ISBN 978-0-300-07074-3. OCLC 469929318.
- Solnit, Albert J.; Nordhaus, Barbara F.; Lord, Ruth (1992). When Home is No Haven: Child Placement Issues. New Haven, CT: Yale University Press. ISBN 978-0-300-05091-2. OCLC 443647175.
