= Margaret Clark (psychologist) =

American psychologist

- Education: Franklin & Marshall College (BA); University of Maryland, College Park (PhD)
- Occupation: Psychologist
- Scientific career
- Fields: Psychology

Margaret ("Peggy") Sydnor Clark is an American psychologist.

Clark received her B.A. in Government and Psychology from Franklin and Marshall College in 1973, and obtained a Ph.D. in Psychology at the University of Maryland in 1977. She joined the faculty of Carnegie Mellon University as Assistant Professor upon completing her studies, and taught there until moving to Yale University in 2005. At Carnegie Mellon she served as chair of the faculty of Humanities and Social Sciences for a year. At Yale, Clark has served first as master, a position subsequently renamed as head, of Trumbull College since 2013, was named John M. Musser Professor of Psychology in 2015. and in 2021 was named Dean of Academic Affairs for Yale College. She has served as the president of the Society for Personality and Social Psychology and of the Society of Experimental Social Psychology. In 2015, Clark was elected to membership of the American Academy of Arts and Sciences.. In 2018 Clark received the Distinguished Scientist Award from the Society of Experimental Social Psychologists.

== Research contributions ==
Clark is an experimental social psychologist specializing in the psychology of interpersonal relationships and emotion. Since the late 1970’s, she has published extensively on several topics in psychology including the norms governing benefits in close relationships, such as favors and repayments, the norms governing benefits in communal relationships, and the ability of people to adhere to norms in intimate relationships, such as marriages.

She has also investigated the social functions of emotion in both communal relationships. This has included the value of experiencing and communicating emotion, including guilt, hurt, and gratitude, in preserving and strengthening communal relationships.

== Awards and honors ==
In 1991, Dr. Clark received the Berscheid-Hatfield Mid-Career Award from the International Association for Relationships Research (IARR).

In 2014, she was awarded the Distinguished Career Award from the IARR.

In 2015, Clark was elected to membership of the American Academy of Arts and Sciences.

She has received several awards for excellence in teaching, including the Elliot Dunlop Smith Award and the Ryan Award, both from Carnegie Mellon.
