= Henry Francis du Pont =

American horticulturist, collector, and founder of Winterthur Museum (1880–1969)

- Du Pont family in 1922
- Born: May 27, 1880; Winterthur, Delaware, U.S.
- Died: April 11, 1969 (aged 88); Winterthur, Delaware, U.S.
- Resting place: Du Pont de Nemours Cemetery
- Education: Harvard University (B.A.)
- Known for: Founder of Winterthur Museum, Garden and Library
- Political party: Republican
- Spouse: Ruth Wales (m. 1916; died 1967)
- Children: Pauline; Ruth
- Parents: Henry Algernon du Pont; Mary Pauline Foster
- Relatives: Louise E. du Pont Crowninshield (sister)

Henry Francis du Pont (May 27, 1880 – April 11, 1969) was an American horticulturist, collector of early American furniture and decorative arts, breeder of Holstein Friesian cattle, and scion of the powerful du Pont family. Converted into a museum in 1951, his estate of Winterthur in Delaware is the world's premier museum of American furniture and decorative arts.

== Early life and education ==
Henry was born on May 27, 1880, at Winterthur. He was the only son of Henry Algernon du Pont and Mary Pauline Foster to live to maturity; by the time he was born, his parents had already buried five children. Their only other surviving child, Louise E. du Pont Crowninshield, was a historic preservationist and founding trustee of the National Trust for Historic Preservation.

A shy and lonely boy who contrasted with his authoritarian father, young du Pont attended boarding school at Groton School in Massachusetts. After graduating from Groton at the bottom of his class of sixteen, du Pont went on to study horticulture at the Bussey Institution at Harvard University, receiving his bachelor's degree in 1903. His best grade at Harvard was a B minus, for a garden study class. His mother, to whom he was close, died shortly before he graduated, which shook him profoundly and deepened his lifelong reticence. His father recalled him home to oversee the estate, a task at which he would excel.

== Holstein herd ==
When he bought a herd of cows from E.C. Schroeder in 1917, du Pont began breeding Holstein Friesian cattle, originally bred in the north of the Netherlands and Germany. His father approved of this endeavor, telling him “That’s a splendid idea. It will cost less than maintaining a yacht, and it may result in some good for humanity.” On tax returns, he commonly described as his occupation as "farmer." Du Pont became recognized as one of the premier dairy cattle breeders in the United States, and the Winterthur herd dominated national awards issued by Holstein-Friesian Association from the 1920s through the 1960s. Following his death in 1969, Winterthur sold du Pont's herd.

== Winterthur estate ==
Du Pont became interested in antique furniture in 1923 after visiting the farmhouse of Electra Havemeyer Webb in Shelburne, Vermont, and Beauport, the home of Henry Davis Sleeper in Gloucester, Massachusetts. He recalled, “I had always thought of American furniture as just kitchen furniture. I didn't dream it had so much richness and variety.” His first purchase was a 1737 Pennsylvania chest that is one of more than 90,000 objects on display at Winterthur.

Over the decades, Henry Francis du Pont expanded his family estate from the 30-room house he inherited to a 175-room mansion with many period rooms, some interiors of which he had rescued from old houses before their demolition. He supervised the design of gardens near the house, as well as tree-planting and landscaping throughout the grounds. He also developed a substantial collection of rare books, manuscripts, and scholarly publications, which formed the nucleus of the Winterthur Library, which holds more than 87,000 books and 800,000 manuscripts and images. In 1951, he established the Winterthur Museum and Country Estate and moved into a smaller mansion on the property, where his daughter, Ruth, continued to live after her father's death. The museum holds the premier collection of American decorative arts in the world.

== Awards and honors ==
Du Pont was elected to the American Philosophical Society in 1961. In 1964, du Pont became the inaugural recipient of the Thomas Jefferson Award from the American Society of Interior Designers (then called the National Society of Interior Designers). He received honorary doctorates from Yale University, Williams College, and the University of Delaware, along with a Medal of Honor from the Garden Club of America in 1956. He belonged to the American Antiquarian Society, the Colonial Society of Massachusetts, the American Philosophical Society, and the Walpole Society and served as a trustee of the Whitney Museum, the Philadelphia Museum of Art, and the New York Botanical Garden, among other cultural organizations.

== Personal life ==
In 1916, after a seven-year courtship, he married socialite Ruth Wales (1889–1967), a Hyde Park neighbor of du Pont's Groton classmate Franklin Roosevelt, who attended their wedding. Ruth had little interest in farming and disliked Winterthur, dismissing the rural estate as "Frog Hollow" and preferring to spend most of the year at their Park Avenue apartment in New York City or their summer residence at Southampton on Long Island. Southampton's Ruth Wales du Pont Sanctuary was named after her.

Henry and Ruth had two children, Pauline Louise du Pont (1918–2007) and Ruth Ellen du Pont Lord (1922–2014). Their younger daughter, Ruth, wrote a memoir about her father and his estate, Henry F. du Pont and Winterthur: A Daughter's Portrait (Yale University Press, 1999), which portrayed du Pont as a kindly but aloof parent.

The du Ponts were lifelong Republicans and openly expressed distaste for their friend Roosevelt's New Deal programs.

Du Pont died on April 11, 1969. He was buried in Du Pont de Nemours Cemetery.

== Legacy ==
Established by du Pont in 1951, the Winterthur Museum, Garden and Library is the premier collection of American decorative arts in the world.

First Lady Jacqueline Kennedy invited du Pont to chair the Fine Arts Committee that advised on the renovation of the White House between 1961 and 1963. Du Pont used his contacts and expertise to acquire donations of fine art and furniture so that the renovation would reflect the best in American design. His insistence on historical accuracy and authenticity sometimes clashed with the French-inspired aesthetic of Kennedy's interior designer, Stéphane Boudin. Once, when du Pont objected to a design, Kennedy wrote to chief usher J. B. West, "Please enclose this humble letter soliciting his approval. If we don't get it he will have the shock of me doing it anyway!" At du Pont's recommendation, Kennedy hired Lorraine Waxman Pearce, a graduate of the Winterthur Program in Early American Culture, as the first White House curator.

Du Pont organized and chaired A Committee to Save the Cooper Union Museum, which had closed in 1963. In response to the public outcry and the du Pont-led lobbying campaign, the Smithsonian Institution acquired the museum in 1968, relocated its collections to the Andrew Carnegie Mansion, and reopened it to the public in 1976.

At the behest of nephew John du Pont, he donated land for the site of the Delaware Museum of Natural History across the street from Winterthur. It opened in 1972.
