= Beauport (Gloucester, Massachusetts) =

Historic house in Massachusetts, United States

- U.S. National Register of Historic Places
- U.S. National Historic Landmark
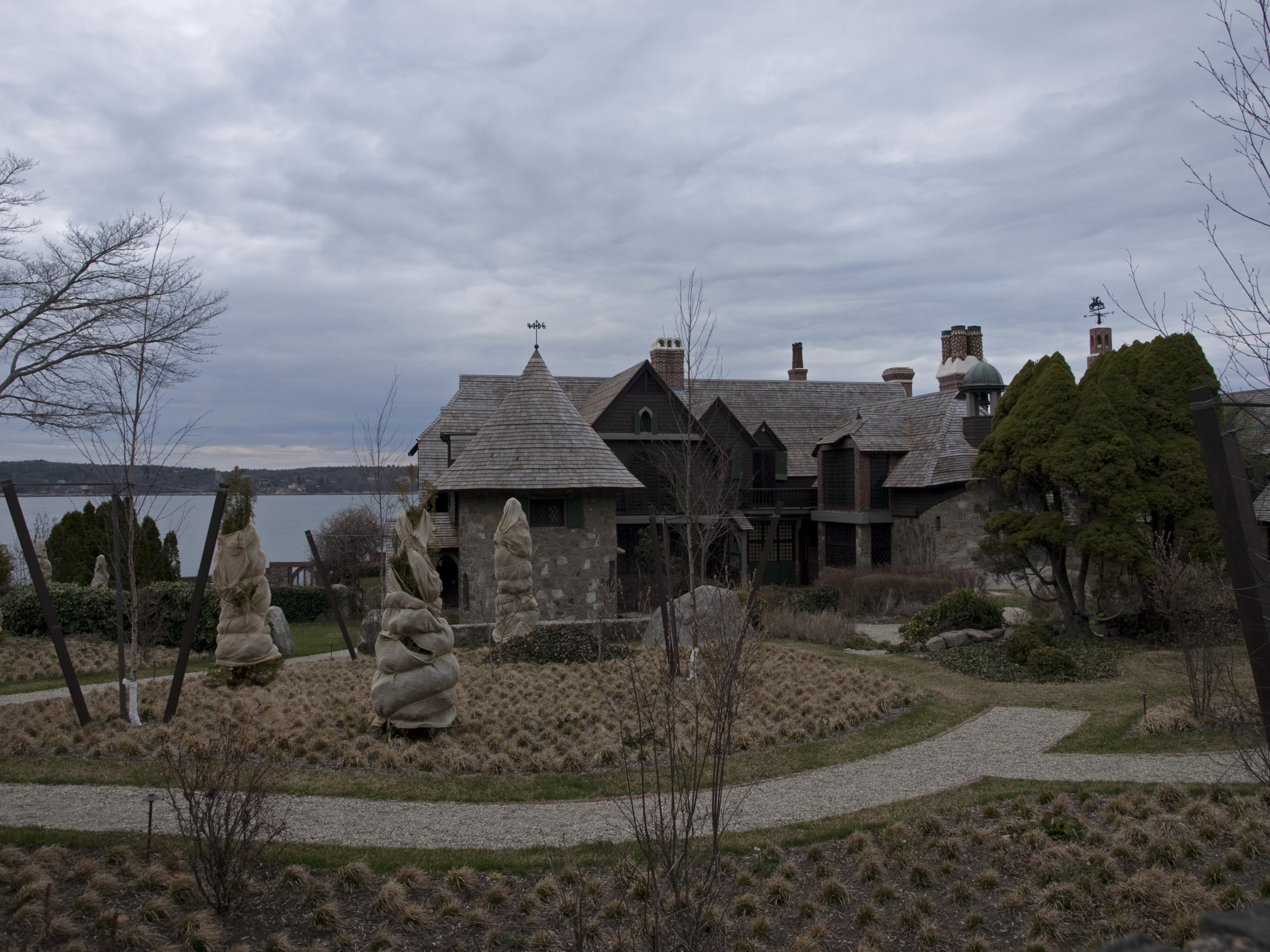
- Beauport

- Location within Massachusetts Location within the United States
- Location: 75 Eastern Point Boulevard, Gloucester, Massachusetts
- Coordinates: 42°35′28″N 70°39′38″W
- Area: .75-acre (3,000 m^{2})
- Built: 1907
- Built by: Henry Davis Sleeper
- Architect: Halfdan M. Hanson
- Architectural style: Shingle Style
- NRHP reference No.: 03000641, 76000246

Significant dates
- Added to NRHP: April 26, 1976
- Designated NHL: May 27, 2003

Beauport, also known as Sleeper–McCann House, Little Beauport, or Henry Davis Sleeper House, is a historic house in Gloucester, Massachusetts, U.S.

== Background ==
Beauport was built starting in 1908 as the summer home of interior decorator and antique collector Henry Davis Sleeper. Situated on the rocks overlooking Gloucester Harbor, Sleeper repeatedly enlarged and modified the structure, and filled it with a large collection of fine art, folk art, architectural artifacts, and other collectible materials. He decorated its rooms, which came to number 56, to evoke different historical and literary themes. Beauport served as his escape, a backdrop for summer parties, and as a showcase for his professional skills.

After Sleeper's death, Charles and Helena Woolworth McCann acquired the house and its contents. They preserved much of Sleeper's designs and decorations, but made some modifications, including adding their porcelain collection to the house. In 1947, their heirs donated the property to the Society for the Protection of New England Antiquities (now Historic New England), which operates the property as a house museum.

The house has frequently been written about in books and magazines, with the first major article appearing in House Beautiful in 1916. It has been featured in publications including Architectural Digest, Country Living, and The Boston Globe, and has been showcased on television programs such as America's Castles.

== Preservation ==
Beauport was declared a National Historic Landmark in 2003, in recognition of its distinctive architecture, its unique collection of artifacts, and for its association for Sleeper, whose design influence extended across the wealthy elite of the eastern United States.

In addition to the main house, the property also has a gate house, garage, and toolshed that were built by Sleeper. The gate house has been adapted by Historic New England as a visitor reception area, and the toolshed now houses restrooms.1 The garage is used for storage and as office space. There is a single non-contributing building on the property, a caretaker's house, which is potentially of local historic interest as an example of a prefabricated post-World War II residential structure.

== Gallery ==
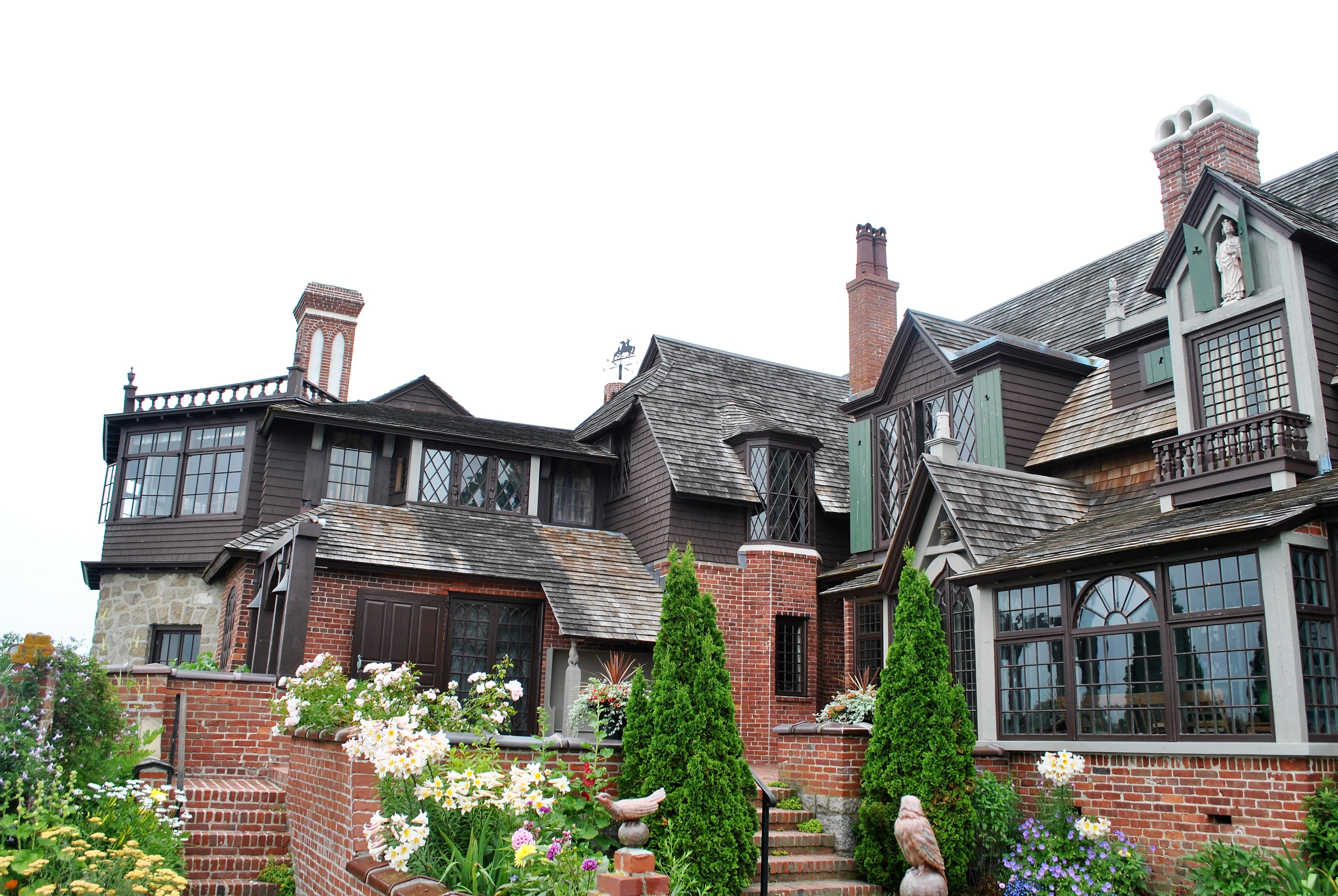
Beauport, 2016

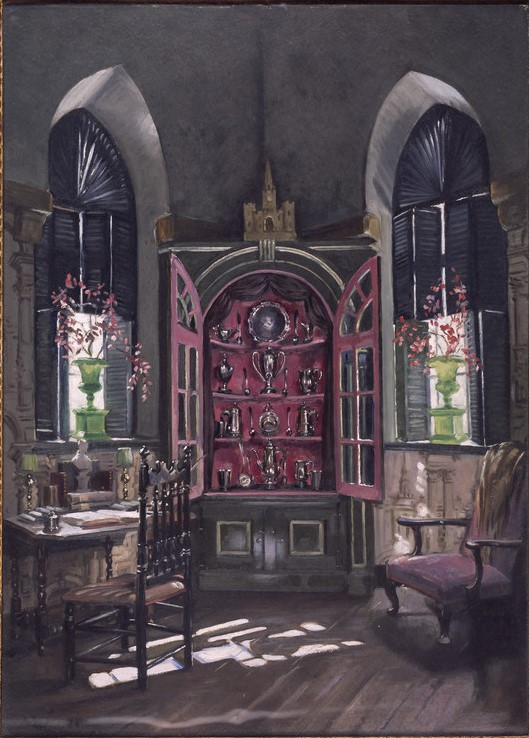
Paul Revere Room (Chapel Chamber), Beauport, Sleeper–McCann House, 1928

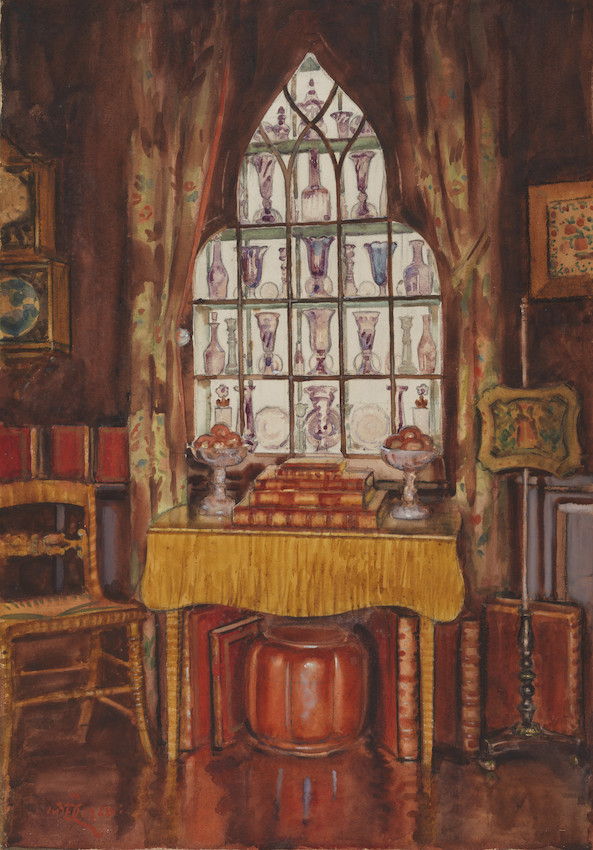
Amethyst Glass passage, Beauport, Sleeper–McCann House, 1928

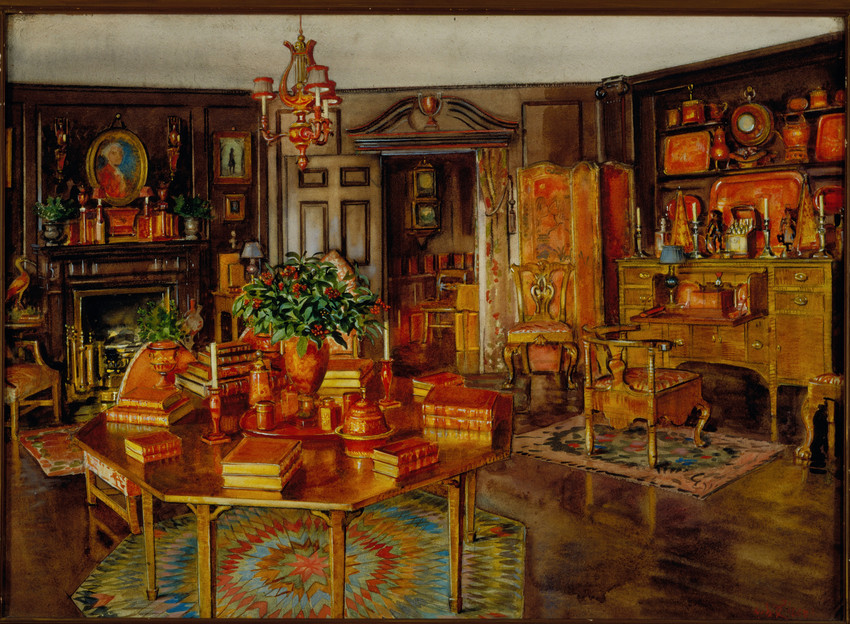
Octagon Room, Beauport, Sleeper–McCann House, 1928

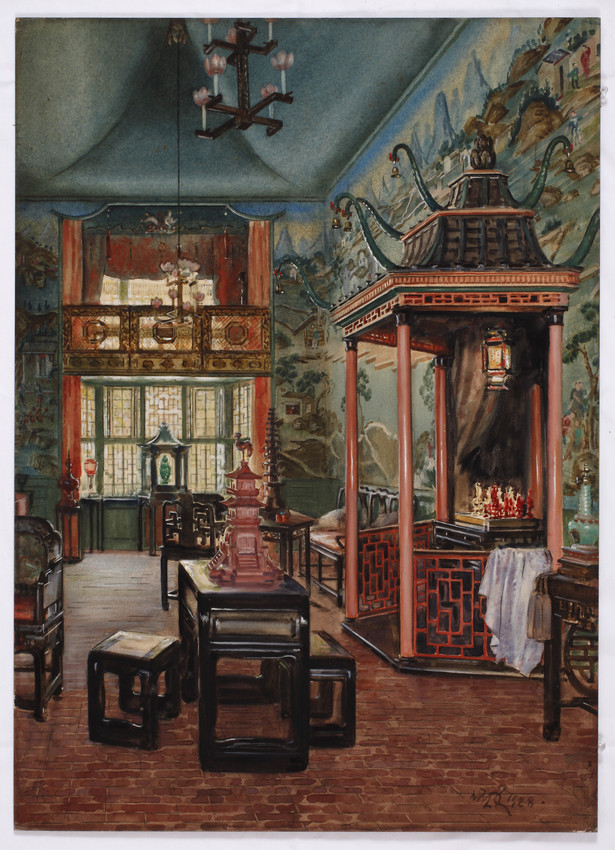
China Trade Room, Beauport, Sleeper–McCann House, 1928

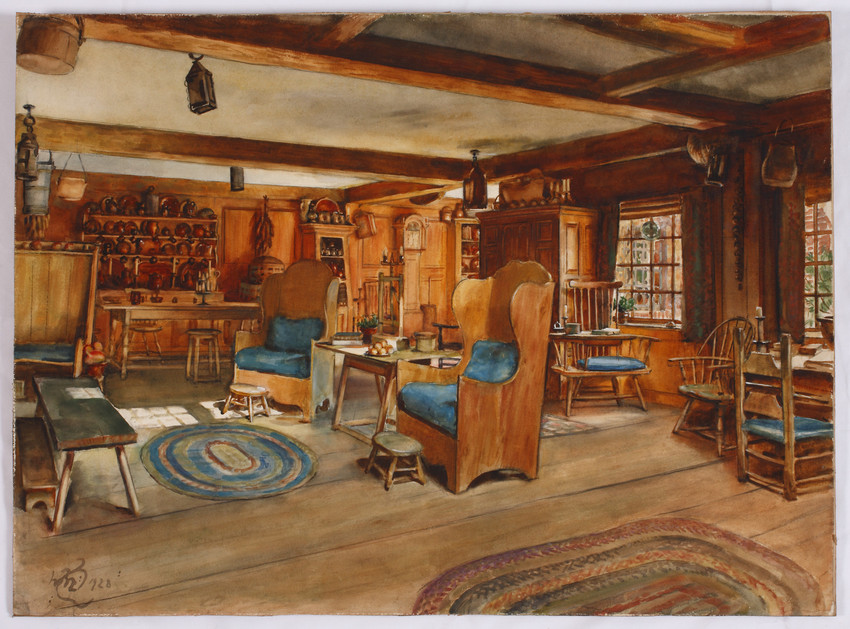
Pine Kitchen, Beauport, Sleeper–McCann House, 1928

== See also ==
Media related to Beauport, Gloucester at Wikimedia Commons

- National Register of Historic Places listings in Gloucester, Massachusetts
- National Register of Historic Places listings in Essex County, Massachusetts
- List of National Historic Landmarks in Massachusetts
