= Harris McDowell =

American politician

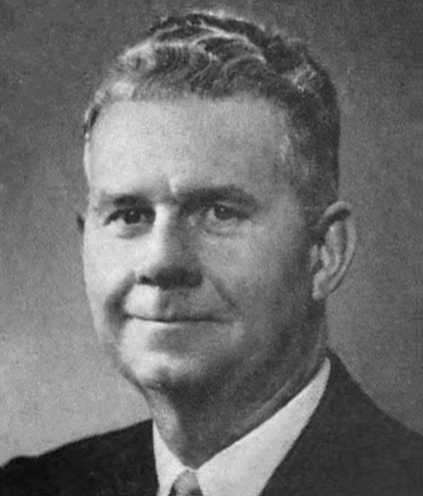
- Official portrait, 1955

Member of the U.S. House of Representatives from Delaware's at-large district
- In office January 3, 1959 – January 3, 1967
- Preceded by: Hal Haskell
- Succeeded by: William Roth
- In office January 3, 1955 – January 3, 1957
- Preceded by: Herbert Warburton
- Succeeded by: Hal Haskell

Secretary of State of Delaware
- In office January 18, 1949 – January 20, 1953
- Governor: Elbert N. Carvel
- Preceded by: William J. Storey
- Succeeded by: John N. McDowell

Member of the Delaware Senate from the 7th New Castle County district
- In office November 4, 1942 – November 6, 1946
- Preceded by: Robert A. Derrickson
- Succeeded by: Wilson A. David

Member of the Delaware House of Representatives from the 14th New Castle County district
- In office November 6, 1940 – November 4, 1942
- Preceded by: Randolph P. Reynolds
- Succeeded by: Frank A. Lawson

Personal details
- Born: Harris Brown McDowell Jr. February 10, 1906 Middletown, Delaware, U.S.
- Died: November 24, 1988 (aged 82) Middletown, Delaware, U.S.
- Resting place: Forest Presbyterian Cemetery
- Party: Democratic
- Spouse: Florence Roberta Neary (m. 1928; died 1978)
- Children: 3, including Harris III
- Parent: Harris McDowell Sr. (father)
- Education: Beacom Business College
- Occupation: Farmer; politician

Harris Brown McDowell Jr. (February 10, 1906 – November 24, 1988) was an American farmer and politician from Middletown in New Castle County, Delaware. A member of the Democratic Party, he served in the Delaware General Assembly and five terms as U.S. Representative from the state of Delaware.

== Early life and family ==
McDowell was born near Middletown, Delaware. His father, Harris McDowell Sr., served in the Delaware Senate from 1923 to 1927. The younger McDowell attended the public schools of Middletown, and graduated from Beacom Business College in Wilmington. He married the former Florence Roberta Neary in 1928, with whom he had 3 children. He lived in Middletown, was engaged in farming, also in the insurance and real estate business, and was a member of the State Board of Agriculture from 1937 until 1940.

== Political career ==
McDowell served in the State House during the 1941–42 session and then in the State Senate for the 1943–44 and 1945–46 sessions. During those years he was a director of Interstate Milk Producers Cooperative and member of Delaware Farm Bureau from 1941 until 1948. He served as Secretary of State for Delaware during Governor Elbert N. Carvel's first term, from 1949 until 1953, and was a member of New Castle County Zoning Commission in 1953 and 1954.

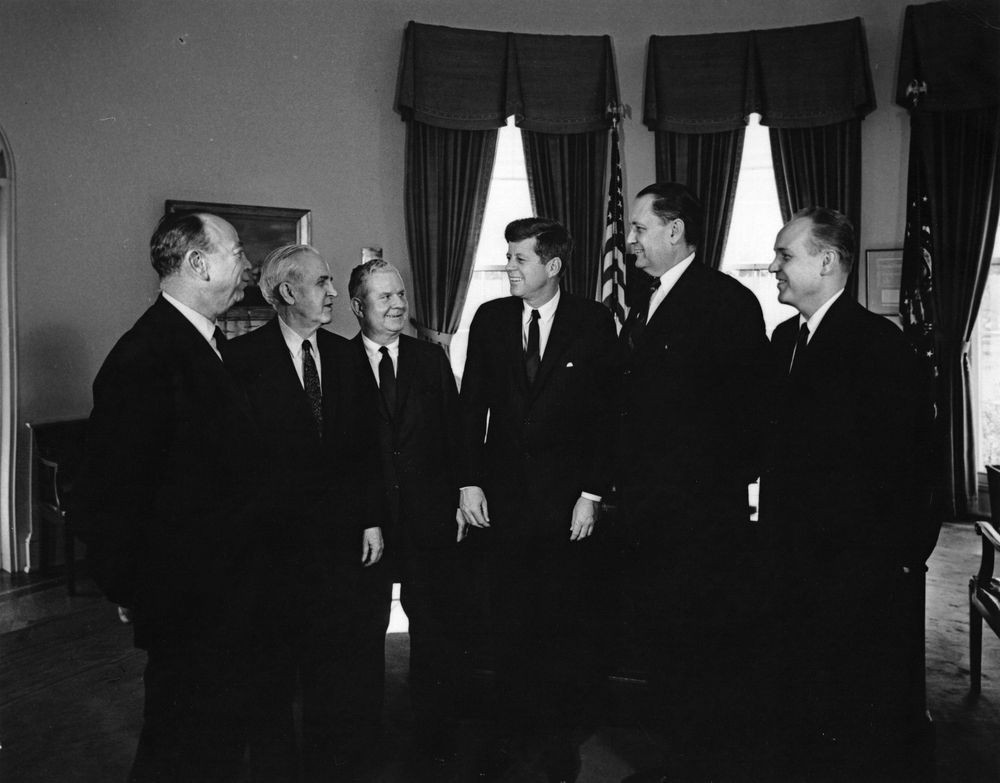
President John F. Kennedy meets with members of Congress. Left to right: Representative Phil M. Landrum (Georgia); Representative James William Trimble (Arkansas); Representative Harris B. McDowell Jr. (Delaware); President Kennedy; Representative Carl Elliott (Alabama); Representative Stanley R. Tupper (Maine). Oval Office, White House, Washington, D.C.

McDowell was elected to the U.S. Representatives in 1954, defeating Republican Lillian I. Martin. During this term, he served with the Democratic majority in the 84th Congress. He lost his bid for a second term in 1956 to Republican Hal Haskell. McDowell then was elected again to the U.S. Representatives in 1958, this time defeating Haskell, and won election three more times, also defeating Republicans James T. McKinstry in 1960, Wilmer F. Williams in 1962, and James H. Snowden in 1964. During these terms, he served with the Democratic majority in the 86th, 87th, 88th, and 89th congresses. Finally, he lost his bid for a sixth term in 1966 to William Roth, then a Wilmington lawyer. His support of President Lyndon B. Johnson's war policies may have contributed to his defeat. In all, he served twice, once from January 3, 1955, until January 3, 1957, and again from January 3, 1959, until January 3, 1967, during the administrations of U.S. presidents Dwight D. Eisenhower, John F. Kennedy, and Lyndon B. Johnson.

McDowell did not sign the 1956 Southern Manifesto, and voted in favor of the Civil Rights Acts of 1960 and 1964, and the Voting Rights Act of 1965. During his time in Congress, McDowell had a predominantly liberal voting record.

== Death and legacy ==
McDowell died in Middletown, Delaware, on November 24, 1988, Thanksgiving Day, after a stroke a month prior. He is buried in the Forest Presbyterian Cemetery there. His son, Harris McDowell III, was a member of the Delaware Senate from 1977 to 2021.

== Almanac ==
Elections are held the first Tuesday after November 1. Members of the General Assembly take office the second Tuesday of January. State Senators have a four-year term and State Representatives have a two-year term. U.S. Representatives take office January 3 and have a two-year term.

Public offices
Office	Type	Location	Began office	Ended office	Notes
State Representative	Legislature	Dover	January 3, 1941	January 3, 1943	
State Senator	Legislature	Dover	January 3, 1943	January 3, 1947	
U.S. Representative	Legislature	Washington	January 3, 1955	January 3, 1957	
U.S. Representative	Legislature	Washington	January 3, 1959	January 3, 1961	
U.S. Representative	Legislature	Washington	January 3, 1961	January 3, 1963	
U.S. Representative	Legislature	Washington	January 3, 1963	January 3, 1965	
U.S. Representative	Legislature	Washington	January 3, 1965	January 3, 1967	

United States congressional service
Dates	Congress	Chamber	Majority	President	Committees	Class/District
1955–1957	84th	U.S. House	Democratic	Dwight D. Eisenhower		at-large
1959–1961	86th	U.S. House	Democratic	Dwight D. Eisenhower		at-large
1961–1963	87th	U.S. House	Democratic	John F. Kennedy		at-large
1963–1965	88th	U.S. House	Democratic	John F. Kennedy; Lyndon B. Johnson		at-large
1965–1967	89th	U.S. House	Democratic	Lyndon B. Johnson		at-large

Election results
Year	Office	Subject	Party	Votes	%	Opponent	Party	Votes	%
1954	U.S. Representative	Harris McDowell	Democratic	79,201	55%	Lillian I. Martin	Republican	65,035	45%
1956	U.S. Representative	Harris McDowell	Democratic	84,644	48%	Hal Haskell	Republican	91,538	52%
1958	U.S. Representative	Harris McDowell	Democratic	76,797	50%	Hal Haskell	Republican	76,099	50%
1960	U.S. Representative	Harris McDowell	Democratic	98,227	50%	James T. McKinstry	Republican	96,337	50%
1962	U.S. Representative	Harris McDowell	Democratic	81,166	53%	Wilmer F. Williams	Republican	71,934	47%
1964	U.S. Representative	Harris McDowell	Democratic	112,361	57%	James H. Snowden	Republican	86,254	43%
1966	U.S. Representative	Harris McDowell	Democratic	72,142	44%	William Roth	Republican	90,961	56%
1968	U.S. Representative	Harris McDowell	Democratic	82,993	41%	William Roth	Republican	117,827	59%

Political offices
U.S. House of Representatives
Preceded by Hal Haskell	Member of the U.S. House of Representatives from Delaware's at-large congressional district 1959–1967	Succeeded by William Roth
Preceded by Herbert Warburton	Member of the U.S. House of Representatives from Delaware's at-large congressional district 1955–1957	Succeeded by Hal Haskell
