= Harris McDowell Sr. =

American politician (1859–1927)

Harris B. McDowell

Member of the Delaware Senate from the 7th New Castle County district
- In office November 8, 1922 – November 3, 1926
- Preceded by: John E. Latta
- Succeeded by: Elmer David

Personal details
- Born: Harris Brown McDowell; September 1859; New London Township, Pennsylvania, U.S.
- Died: March 11, 1927 (aged 67); New York, New York, U.S.
- Political party: Democratic
- Children: 5, including Harris Jr.
- Education: New York University (DVS)
- Occupation: Veterinarian; politician

Harris Brown McDowell Sr. (September 1859 – March 11, 1927) was an American politician who served in the Delaware Senate. A veterinarian and member of the Democratic Party, he represented New Castle County's 7th district, which included Middletown, where he spent most of his life. His son, Harris Jr., and grandson, Harris III, both followed in his footsteps by winning election to the state senate in 1942 and 1976, respectively. Harris Jr. only served one term but went on to serve as Secretary of State of Delaware and as a member of the United States House of Representatives, while Harris III remained in the senate for 44 years, retiring as the longest-serving legislator in the history of the Delaware General Assembly.
