= Henry Davis Sleeper =

American antiquarian and interior decorator (1878-1934)

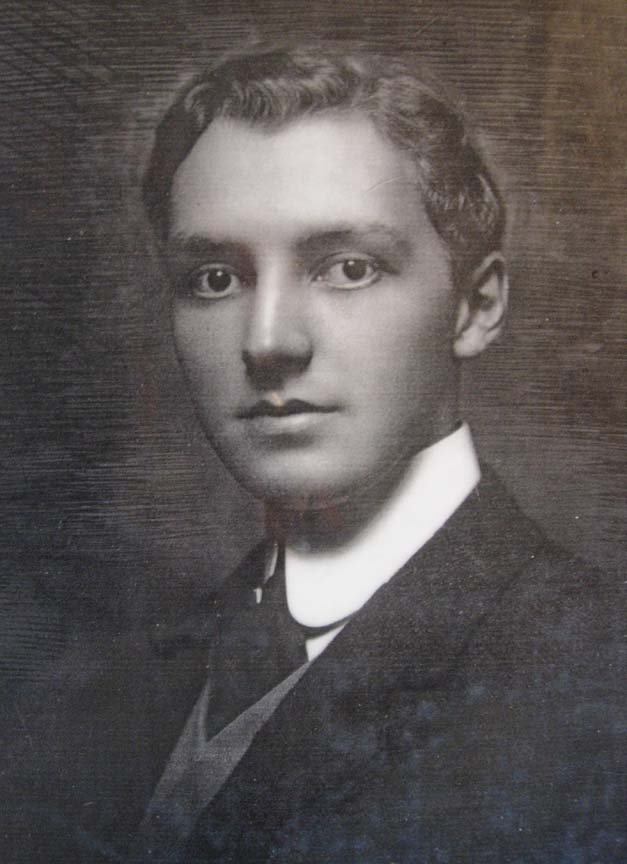
- Born: March 27, 1878; Boston, Massachusetts, U.S.
- Died: September 22, 1934 (aged 56); Boston, Massachusetts, U.S.
- Resting place: Mount Auburn Cemetery
- Occupations: Antiquarian; Interior decorator
- Awards: Croix de Guerre; Legion of Honor

Henry Davis Sleeper (March 27, 1878 – September 22, 1934) was an American antiquarian, collector, and interior decorator best known for Beauport, his Gloucester, Massachusetts, country home that is "one of the most widely published houses of the twentieth century."

== Early life ==
Henry Davis Sleeper was born March 27, 1878, in Boston. He was the youngest son of Major Jacob Henry Sleeper (1839–1891), a distinguished Civil War veteran, and Maria (née Westcott) Sleeper (1837–1917). His elder brothers were Jacob Sleeper and Stephen Westcott Sleeper, who later married Elisa Cushing. He was the grandson of Jacob Sleeper, one of the founders of Boston University as well as a clothier and manager of a real estate trust. Henry's education appears to have been by private tutors due to ill health as a child, and it is unclear as to whether he was ever formally educated.

== Career ==
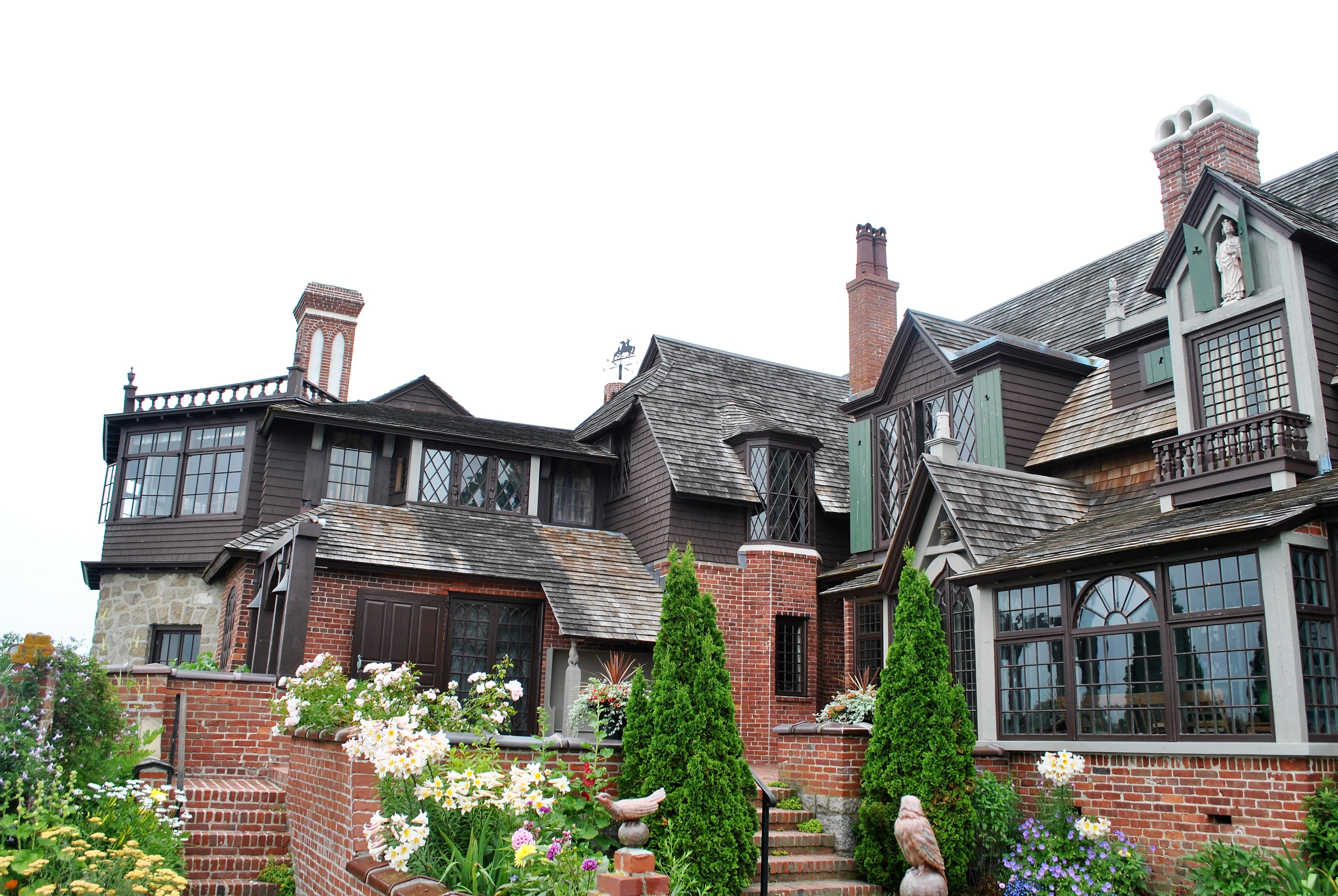
Beauport, 2016

Sleeper was introduced to the Eastern Point in Gloucester, Massachusetts, in the spring of 1906 by the Harvard economist A. Piatt Andrew, who later served in the U.S. House of Representatives, who had built a handsome summer mansion, Red Roof, on a rock ledge above the harbor.

Sleeper was much taken by the location and immediately decided to build a little further along the ledge from Red Roof. He purchased the land on Eastern Point in Gloucester on August 13, 1907. Eastern Point was an enclave occupied by a somewhat louche group of "Bohemian" artists and intellectuals with frequent visits from some of the more colorful and unconventional members of Boston society, in particular Isabella Stewart Gardner, the legendary art collector and builder of Fenway Court in the Back Bay Fens, now the Isabella Stewart Gardner Museum. The group became known as Dabsville, DABS containing the initials of the core members.

=== Beauport ===
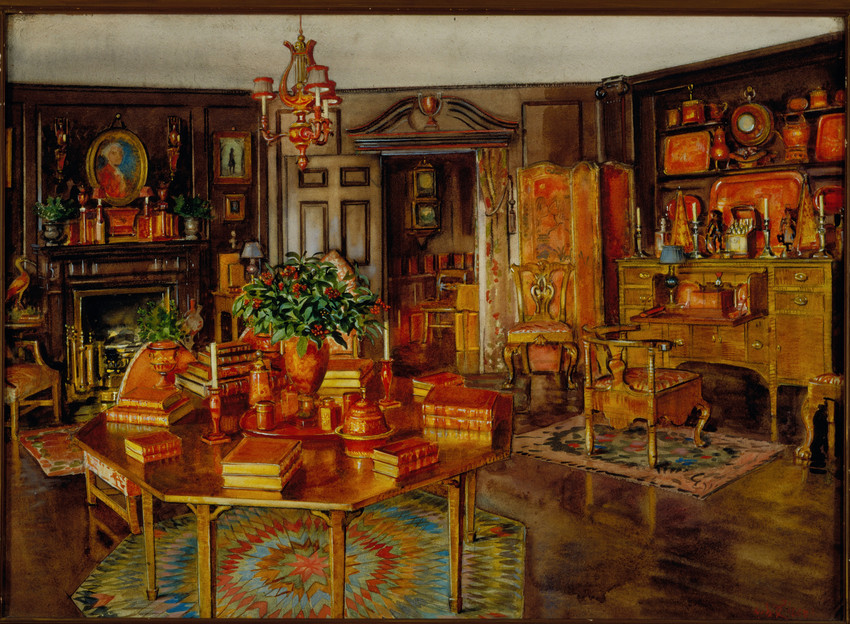
Octagon Room, Beauport, Sleeper–McCann House, 1928

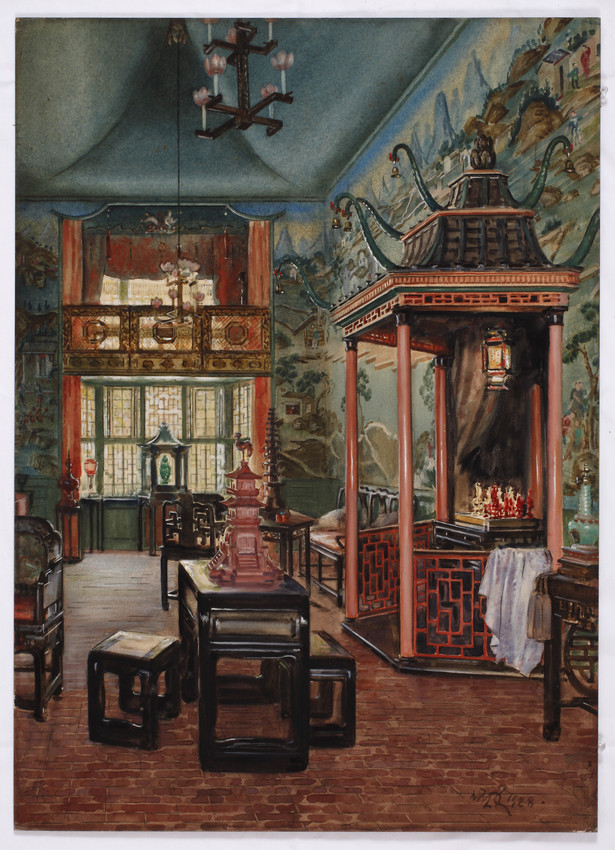
China Trade Room, Beauport, Sleeper–McCann House, 1928

In the fall of 1907, construction of Beauport, Sleeper's relatively modestly scaled Arts and Crafts-style house, began and was sufficiently finished to receive A. Piatt Andrew as a house guest in May 1908. As property flanking Sleeper's became available, Beauport was expanded several times until 1925, often in response to events or important experiences in his life. He constructed the house with pieces of old buildings, including paneling from an 18th-century house in Essex, Massachusetts that he used in his entrance hall and dining room. He salvaged Gothic windows from a church, various fireplaces and doorways from homes in Connecticut and Rhode Island, and a 3 and one-eight inch thick "Indian-repelling door" from Deerfield, Massachusetts.

Beauport served as Sleeper's escape, a backdrop for summer parties, and became not only a home, but a major showcase for Sleeper's interior design and decoration business. Clients could choose wallpapers, window treatments, or entire rooms to have reproduced in their own houses. Sleeper had a specialty in "Puritan Revival", the Jacobean-American architecture and decorative arts of the original American colonies, but his tastes and interests included French decor of several centuries and a great deal of orientalia. Sleeper decorated the (ultimately 56) rooms to evoke different historical and literary themes.

=== Museum director ===
Sleeper served as the Director of the Museum of the Society for the Preservation of New England Antiquities (today known as Historic New England) from 1911 to 1913, and was a founding member and trustee of the Shirley-Eustis House Association.

=== World War I ===
In 1918, Sleeper became the U.S. Representative of, and a major fundraiser for, the American Field Service, an ambulance corps founded by A. Piatt Andrew early in World War I. While Andrew served in the battle zones, Sleeper crisscrossed the Atlantic with supplies and funds, and worked closely with the French military. France awarded him the Croix de Guerre and the Legion of Honor.

=== Post-war ===
After the war, Sleeper's practice expanded and he won national recognition via prestigious periodicals and several high-visibility clients. Isabella Stewart Gardner commissioned work from him; Henry Francis du Pont engaged his assistance with the big new wing of the family's massive Delaware house, Winterthur, now a famed museum of American decorative arts; he designed for Hollywood stars Joan Crawford and Fredric March. In May 1934, he was granted an Honorary Membership in the American Institute of Architects.

Sleeper also maintained a townhouse in Boston, which was published in Country Life in 1930.

Sleeper died in Massachusetts General Hospital of leukemia on September 22, 1934, aged 56. He is buried in his family's plot in Mount Auburn Cemetery in Watertown and Cambridge, Massachusetts. Andrew wrote the memorial tribute published in the Gloucester Daily Times.

== Personal life ==
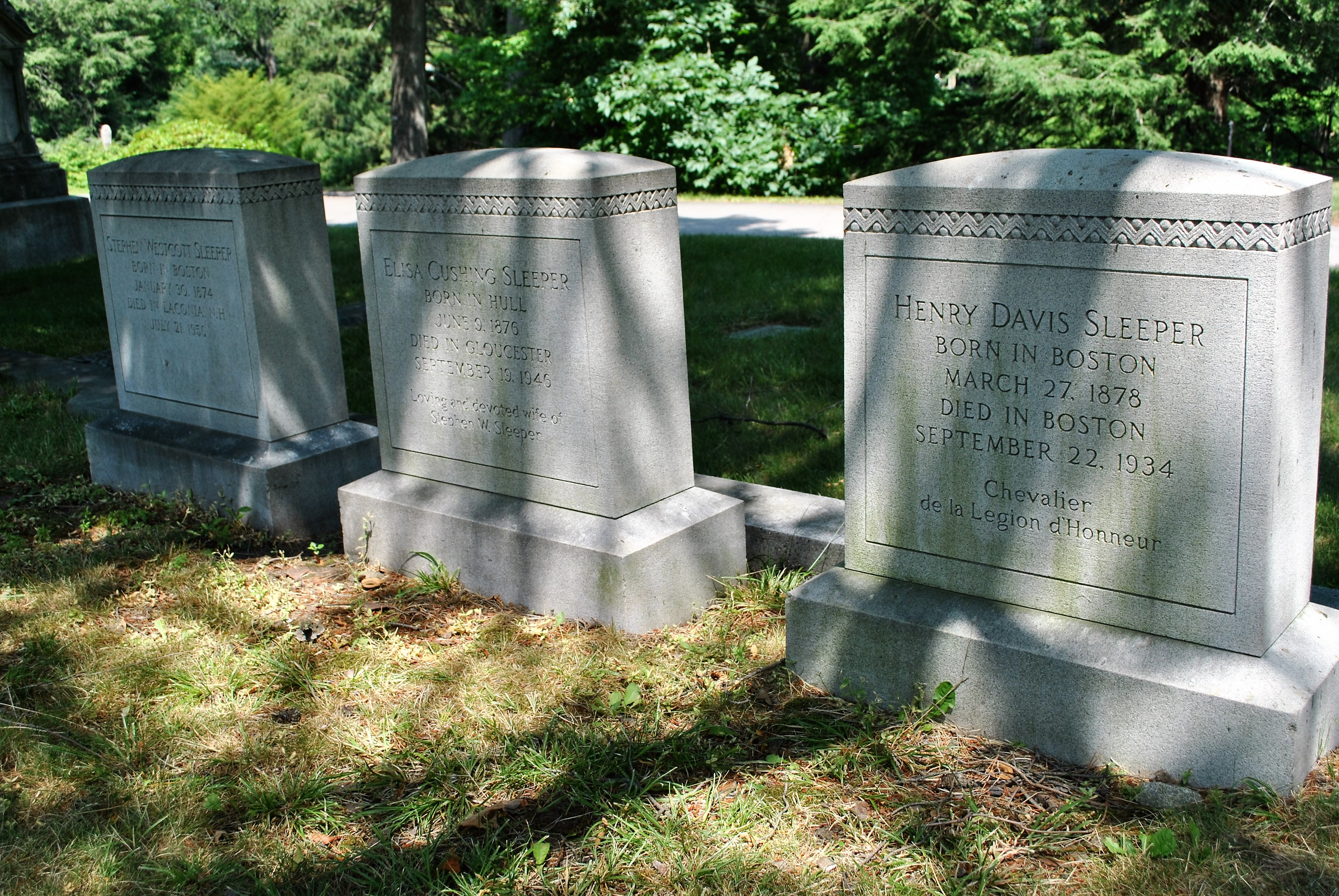
Mount Auburn Cemetery, Cambridge, MA

Sleeper never married and left no direct descendants. He maintained a townhouse in Boston, which was published in Country Life in 1930.

== Death and legacy ==
Sleeper died in Massachusetts General Hospital of leukemia on September 22, 1934, and is buried in his family's plot in Mount Auburn Cemetery in Watertown and Cambridge, Massachusetts. Andrew wrote the memorial tribute published in the Gloucester Daily Times.

As he had no direct descendants, Beauport was sold to Helena Woolworth McCann, the daughter of Frank Winfield Woolworth, who was contacted by Henry Francis Du Pont urging that Sleeper's rooms remain exactly as they were as the value of the house and its collection of art objects depended primarily on their being left unchanged. McCann preserved the house as it was; at her death, the house was inherited by her daughters from whose hands it passed into the care of Historic New England in 1942. The McCanns' daughter, also named Helena, was the wife of Winston Frederick Churchill Guest (who later married C. Z. Guest after their 1944 divorce).

Beauport, Sleeper-McCann House was declared a National Historic Landmark in 2003. In 2008, due to new information on Sleeper's life emerging, the decision was made to acknowledge his homosexuality in tour guides of Beauport, "not to define Sleeper but to contextualize him."
