= George deForest Lord =

American academic

George deForest Lord (December 2, 1919 – March 31, 2012) was an American academic and the George M. Bodman Professor of English Literature at Yale University.

== Biography ==
Lord was born on December 2, 1919, in New York City, and named after his father, a lawyer. He was educated at Groton School, and graduated from Yale College in 1942. Lord saw military service with the United States Marines during World War II, serving as a pilot aboard the North American B-25 Mitchell. He flew 45 combat missions and was awarded the Distinguished Flying Cross as well as the Air Medal with four Gold Stars.

Lord returned to Yale and began teaching in 1947. Subsequently, Lord completed his doctorate in 1951. Between 1963 and 1966, he was master of Trumbull College. Lord was named a full professor in 1966, and appointed the George M. Bodman Professor of English Literature in 1988.

He died at Connecticut Hospice on March 31, 2012, aged 92. He was survived by three children born to his first wife, Ruth du Pont Lord.
