= Benjamin Gale =

American physician, scientist, agriculturist and political polemicist (1715–1790)

- Born: December 14, 1715; Jamaica, Queens, New York U.S.
- Died: May 6, 1790 (aged 74) (Note: Some sources wrongly state May 21, 1790, as his death date.); Killingworth, Middlesex County, Connecticut U.S.
- Education: Yale University (A.M.)
- Spouse: Hannah Eliot (m. 1739; died 1781)
- Children: 8
- Scientific career
- Academic advisors: Jared Eliot

Benjamin Gale (December 14, 1715 – May 6, 1790) was an American physician, scientist, agriculturist, inventor and political polemicist who was known for his political protests against the New Lights, which resulted in a fifteen year pamphlet war against leader Thomas Clap, and was himself considered a leader of Old Light politics in Connecticut.

Gale was born in Jamaica, Queens. After graduating from Yale University, he moved to Killingworth, Connecticut, where he further studied medicine and surgery. Throughout the next decade he would indulge in several business ventures and investments, which led to his invention of the drill plough. He was elected as justice of the peace and state representative in 1747, and would serve in those capacities until 1773 and 1770 respectively.

In 1755, Gale would publish his first pamphlet against Thomas Clap, which he wrote as a response against an earlier pamphlet written by Clap. This pamphlet ended up being successful, prompting a pamphlet war with Clap throughout the next fifteen years, which ended in Clap's eventual resignation in 1766.

Throughout his later life, Gale went on several ventures as an inventor, vintner and distiller. After surviving a serious illness in 1788, Gale eventually fell ill again which led to his death in 1790.

== Early life and education ==
Benjamin Gale was born on December 14, 1715, in Jamaica, New York, to John Gale, and Mary. His paternal ancestor, Edmond Gale, came to Cambridge, Massachusetts, in the early 17th century from England, and died in Boston. Edmond's son, Abel, (Note: Alternatively spelled Abell.) then came to Jamaica where he bought land, on which he built his residence, on October 18, 1665. Abel's son and Benjamin's father, John, was a miller, owning multiple mills in Long Island, until 1721, when he sold all of his mills for £1500. John then moved to Goshen, New York, the same year, becoming a proprietor of the then newly-established town.

Shortly after his settlement in Goshen, Benjamin was educated by Samuel Johnson at his home in Stratford, Connecticut, as Johnson was known to instruct young New Yorkers. There, he was taught Latin and Greek, which he retained working knowledge of throughout his life. At the age of thirteen, Gale was enrolled into Yale University, where he graduated in 1733, and received his Master of Arts three years later.

After his graduation, Gale moved to the village of Killingworth, Connecticut, where he studied medicine and surgery under Jared Eliot. On June 6, 1739, Gale married Jared's daughter Hannah, with whom he had eight children, making him the son-in-law of Jared.

== Career ==
=== 1740–1746 Business ventures and investments ===
Though never being considered wealthy, Gale had several business ventures and investments, including trading horses to the West Indies. He also built and operated steel mill, along with his brother-in-law Aaron Eliot, until as late as 1787. Jared had made some unsuccessful experiments of an early prototype of the drill plough, and after his death, Gale continued to work on the prototype, and sent a model to the Royal Society of Arts, and was subsequently awarded with a gold medal in January 1770. Though this was then seen as a controversy, when Benoni Hillyer, a wheelwright who built the model, claimed that he was the sole constructor of it and that Gale had only acted as an agent communicating with the society. Hillfyer then unsuccessfully filed a fifty-pound damage suit against Gale.

He also owned two acres of land within a mile of his residence and acquired six slaves, and managed 200 further acres of land in 1767, on his wife's inheritance of his father-in-law. Later, he constructed a "mansion house", which was then used as a tavern after his death.

=== 1747–1773 Political activities and the pamphlet war against Thomas Clap ===
Gale was firstly elected justice of the peace in May 1747, serving continuously for twenty-two years until 1773, except for four years from 1755 to 1759, due to the French and Indian War causing him to have heavy responsibilities as a Killingworth state representative, in which capacity he served from May 1747 to October 1770. He was allied with the Old Lights, due to his unwillingness to accept the strict Calvinism of the New Lights, and when governor Roger Wolcott was voted out of office in 1754, it is thought that one factor was him dropping the repressive laws against the New Lights, of which Gale and other Old Lights were of opposition, which was criticized by a political enemy, hinting to the fact that he was the reason Wolcott was voted out, as Gale was considered a leader of the Old Lights in Connecticut politics.

Subsequently in 1755, Gale began his avocation of added control and launched a political attack on Yale president Thomas Clap, who was quoted as a "calm and still judicious great Man," who was firm to the point of "absolute "Despotism", and as such seen as a strategic and vulnerable target. Gale wrote The Present State of the Colony of Connecticut Considered, in which he called Clap "an Assuming, Arbitrary, Designing Man; who under a Cloak of Zeal for Orthodoxy, design'd to govern both Church and State and Damn all who would not worship the Beast", as response to Clap's pamphlet, which he wrote in 1754 at the time of Wolcott's defeat, called The Religious Constitution of Colleges, Especially of Yale-College, in which he pointed out that Yale had been founded and governed by ministers for the purpose of properly training the clergy. This attack was successful, leading to a decline in standards of political decorum and an increased political bitterness, subsequently prompting a pamphlet war with Clap throughout the next fifteen years.

The next pamphlet called A Letter to a Member of the Lower House of Assembly of the Colony of Connecticut: Shewing, That the Taxes at Yale-College, Are Stated Higher Than Necessary to Defray the Annual Expences was published in March 1759, by Gale, in which he claimed that Yale was not only making a profit of students' fees, but also that Clap should be investigated by the Connecticut General Assembly. Though no investigation was launched, Reverend John Graham accepted the challenge of his pamphlet, causing Clap to again be the centre of another pamphlet war.

This pamphlet led to even more criticism to Clap's administration, and though Gale eventually withdrew from the controversy, his pamphlets continued to be used against Clap's administration leading to his resignation after a dramatic defense in 1766.

== Later life and death ==
Gale helped bring attention to Abel Buell's experiments with type-founding, sending them to prominent New England intellectuals and some specimen to the American Philosophical Society, of which he was one of the earliest Connecticut members. Along this, in 1775, he helped David Bushnell with his experiments of the American Turtle, providing his assistance.

An amateur vintner and distiller, Gale sent a specimen of his grape wine Peter Collinson, who dubbed him as "the American Bacchus". More than ten years thereafter, he served Ezra Stiles with a drink called "Spirits", which he had distilled from corn syrup.

Gale was the examining surgeon for Connecticut army physicians and, in 1787, was selected as the first president of the Connecticut Medical Society. (Note: This was before the Connecticut Medical Society had been granted a charter by the legislature in 1792.)

In 1788, Gale survived a serious illness, but two years later, he fell ill again leading to his death on May 6, 1790. After his death, a will he had written in 1788, was "Judged Illegal" by a probate court, due to doubts about his mental competence.

== Works cited ==
- Stark, Bruce P. (2000) [1999]. "Gale, Benjamin (1715-1790), physician, scientist, and political polemicist". Gale, Benjamin. Oxford University Press. doi:10.1093/anb/9780198606697.article.0100308. ISBN 978-0-19-860669-7.
- Groce, George C. (1937). "Benjamin Gale". The New England Quarterly. 10 (4). MIT Press: 697–716. doi:10.2307/359933. ISSN 0028-4866. JSTOR 359933.
- Whittemore, Henry (1884). History of Middlesex county, Connecticut, with biographical sketches of its prominent men. New York: J.B. Beers & Co. pp. 240–241.
- Gale, George (1866). The Gale family records in England and the United States, to which are added some account of the Tottingham family of New England, and Bogardus, Waldron, and Young families of New York. Galesville: Leith & Gale. pp. 188–202.
- Dexter, Franklin Bowditch (1885). Biographical sketches of the graduates of Yale College : with annals of the college history. New York: Henry Holt and Company. pp. 474–480.
