= List of presidents of Yale University =

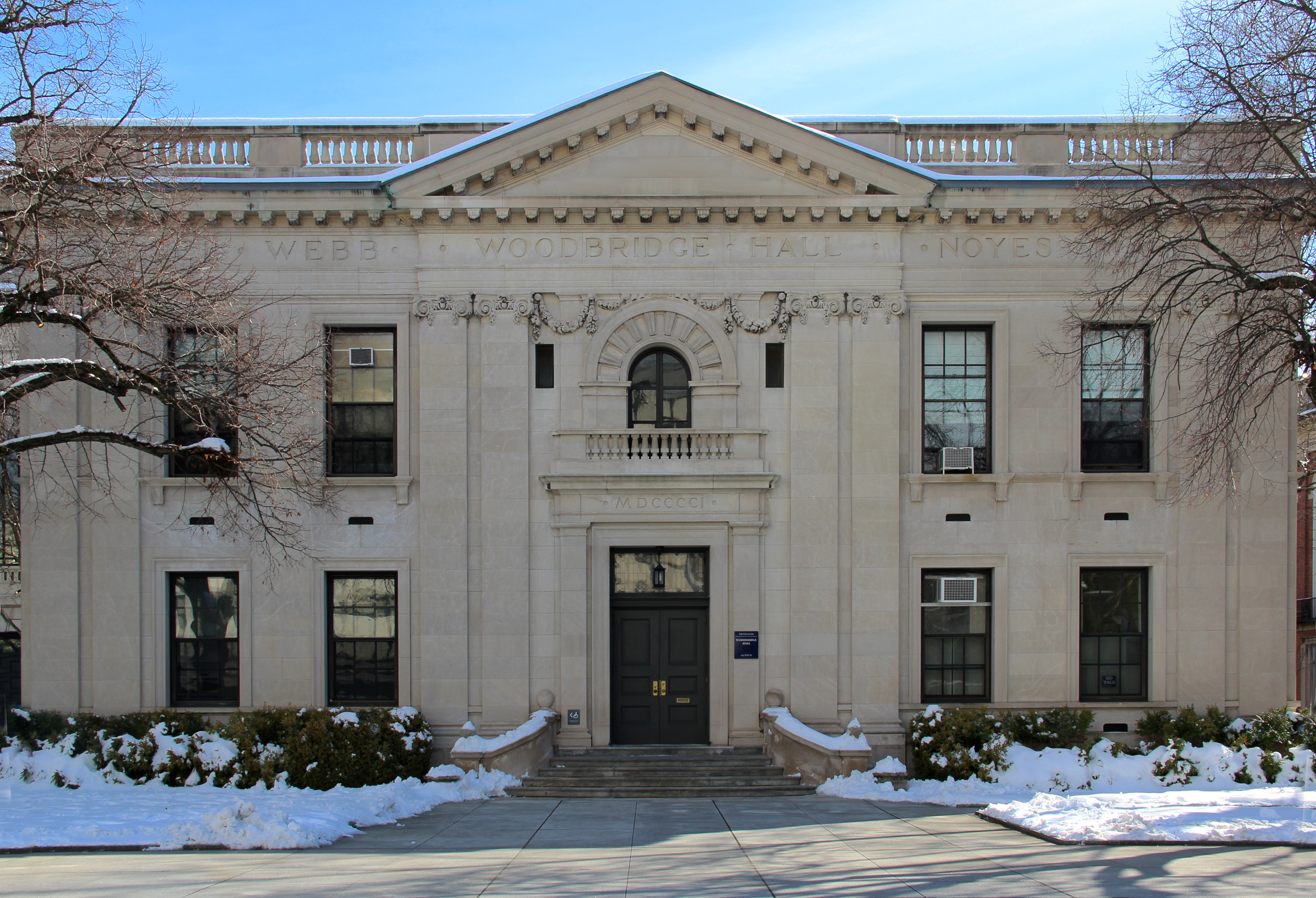
Woodbridge Hall, location of the university president's office.

Yale University was founded in 1701 as a school for Congregationalist ministers. One of its ten founding ministers, Abraham Pierson, became its first Rector, the administrative and ecclesiastical head of the college. After Pierson, four more ministers served as rectors of the collegiate school, until 1745 when Yale College was chartered by the Colony of Connecticut and Thomas Clap's title was changed to president. In 1878, Yale incorporated as a university, and incumbent Timothy Dwight V became the last president of the college and the first of Yale University. The first president not ordained as a minister was Arthur Twining Hadley, inaugurated in 1899; no ordained person has held the office since.

The president is elected by the Yale Corporation, the governing body of the University on which the president sits ex-officio. The corporation's bylaws state that the president is "chief executive officer of the University and as such is responsible for the general direction of all its affairs." The president nominates other university officers, including the provost, secretary, and other vice presidents, for election by the corporation. Other top-level administrative positions, such as university chaplain, deans of schools, and masters of residential colleges, are appointed by the president alone.

The university's current president is Maurie D. McInnis who took office on July 1, 2024. She earned her Ph.D. from Yale, is trained as a cultural historian and formerly served as the sixth president of Stony Brook University.

The Office of the President is located in Woodbridge Hall, a 1901 building erected specifically for administrative purpose. The university maintains an official home for the president on Hillhouse Avenue, which hosts presidential events. Peter Salovey, inaugurated in 2013, is the first president since 1986 to use the home as his primary residence.

== Rectors of Yale College (1701–1745) ==
The following persons had led Yale as rector:

No.	Image	Rector of Yale College	Term start	Term end	Refs.
Rectors of the Collegiate School (1701–1719)
1		Abraham Pierson (1641–1707)	November 11, 1701	March 5, 1707	
2 (Note: Served pro tempore)		Samuel Andrew (1656–1738)	1707	March 24, 1719	
Rectors of Yale College (1719–1745)
3		Timothy Cutler (1684–1765)	March 24, 1719	October 17, 1722	
4		Elisha Williams (1694–1755)	September 13, 1726	October 31, 1739	
5		Thomas Clap (1703–1767)	April 2, 1740	June 1, 1745	

Table notes:

== Presidents of Yale College (1740–1887) and Yale University (1887–) ==
The following persons had led Yale as president:

No.	Image	President of Yale College	Term start	Term end	Refs.
Presidents of Yale College (1745–1887)
5		Thomas Clap (1703–1767)	June 1, 1745	September 10, 1766	
6 (Note: Served pro tempore)		Naphtali Daggett (1727–1780)	October 22, 1766	March 25, 1777	
7		Ezra Stiles (1727–1795)	June 23, 1778	May 12, 1795	
8		Timothy Dwight IV (1752–1817)	September 8, 1795	January 11, 1817	
9		Jeremiah Day (1773–1867)	July 23, 1817	October 21, 1846	
10		Theodore Dwight Woolsey (1801–1889)	October 21, 1846	October 11, 1871	
11		Noah Porter III (1811–1892)	October 11, 1871	July 1, 1886	
Presidents of Yale University (1887–present)
12		Timothy Dwight V (1828–1916)	July 1, 1886	June 28, 1899	
13		Arthur Twining Hadley (1856–1930)	June 29, 1899	June 22, 1921	
14		James Rowland Angell (1869–1949)	June 22, 1921	June 30, 1937	
15		Charles Seymour (1885–1963)	July 1, 1937	June 30, 1951	
16		A. Whitney Griswold (1906–1963)	July 1, 1951	April 19, 1963 (Note: Died in office.)	
acting		Kingman Brewster, Jr. (1919–1988)	April 19, 1963	October 12, 1963	
17		Kingman Brewster, Jr. (1919–1988)	October 12, 1963	May 17, 1977	
18		Hanna Holborn Gray (born 1930)	May 18, 1977	June 30, 1978	
19		A. Bartlett Giamatti (1938–1989)	July 1, 1978	June 30, 1986	
20		Benno C. Schmidt, Jr. (1942–2023)	July 1, 1986	June 16, 1992	
21 (Note: Served as acting president)		Howard R. Lamar (1923–2023)	June 17, 1992	June 30, 1993	
22		Richard C. Levin (born 1947)	July 1, 1993	June 30, 2013	
23		Peter Salovey (born 1958)	July 1, 2013	June 30, 2024	
24	headshot of Dr. Maurie McInnis	Maurie D. McInnis (born 1966)	July 1, 2024	present	

Table notes:
