= Elisha Williams =

The Reverend Elisha Williams
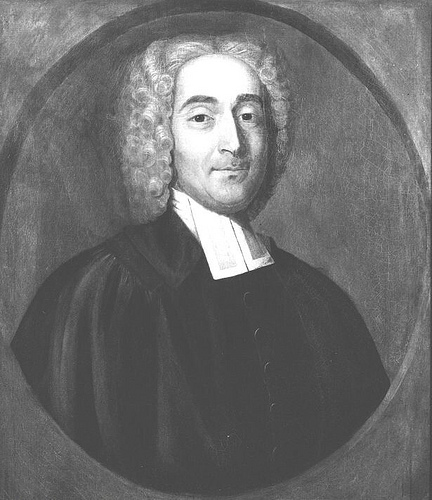
- Portrait of Rev. Elisha Williams, fourth Rector of Yale College

4th Rector of Yale University
- In office 1726–1739
- Preceded by: Timothy Cutler
- Succeeded by: Thomas Clap

Personal details
- Born: August 26, 1694 Hatfield, Massachusetts
- Died: July 24, 1755 (aged 60) Wethersfield, Connecticut

Elisha Williams (August 26, 1694 – July 24, 1755) was a Congregational minister, legislator, militia soldier, jurist, and rector of Yale College from 1726 to 1739.

== Life ==
The son of Rev. William Williams and his wife Elizabeth, née Cotton (daughter of Rev. Seaborn Cotton), he was born at Hatfield, Massachusetts, and educated at Harvard, graduating, at the age of seventeen, in 1711. His first wife, and mother of his seven children (only two of whom survived him), was Eunice Chester. They were married in 1714; she died in 1750. After his marriage he studied law, and was a member of the Connecticut legislature from Wethersfield for five sessions, the first in 1717. He was also a tutor in Weathersfield, Connecticut for those Yale college students who for three years from 1716 to 1719 refused to move from Saybrook Point to New Haven, Connecticut; he was one of the leaders in the attempt to make the schismatic college part of Harvard, an offer which Harvard turned down.

After Yale college was reunited in New Haven, he remained in Weathersfield, studied divinity with his father, and was ordained a clergyman in 1722. He served the church at Wethersfield until 1726, when he became fourth Rector of Yale College, serving in that capacity for thirteen years. He entered the position during a troubled period of Yale's history. Under the leadership of senior Tutor Samuel Johnson between 1716 and 1719, Tutor Daniel Brown from 1718 to 1722, and Rector Timothy Cutler from 1719 to 1722, Yale had begun to teach an Enlightenment curriculum. The "Great Apostasy" of 1722 had seen these three men and four other local clergymen abandon the Puritan Congregationalist church and declare for the Church of England at the close of Yale's commencement.

Yale's trustees fired Cutler and Brown, and searched for an orthodox Rector. After being turned down by six other candidates, the board offered Williams the position in 1726. His mission for the 13 years he was Rector was to restore the previous Puritan curriculum, much of which went back to the early sixteenth century. According to colonial college scholar J. David Hoeveler, “Yale set its sights on an orthodox recovery,” and Rector Williams became “a polemicist for orthodoxy.”

After his resignation as Yale's Rector in 1739, he claimed for reasons of health, though more likely in order to run for governor, Williams immediately resumed his career in politics. While some praise Williams "for his dignified and prudent administration of the College affairs," he left Yale with an antiquated orthodox Puritan curriculum, with little instruction in the classical languages, with the same number of tutors (two) that Yale had since 1716, and with a graduating class size the same as he found it.

He was again a member of the Connecticut legislature for 22 sessions from 1740 to 1754, elected Speaker of the House for five of the sessions, and was appointed Judge of the Superior Court for 1740 to 1743. In the early 1740s, he was influenced by the Great Awakening and converted to the New Lights; his conversion may have been the reason he was not reappointed by the Old Light dominated Assembly to the supreme court.

Shifting professions once again, he became a Colonel of Militia, and served as Chaplain in the expedition sent against Cape Breton in 1745. Abandoning entirely his clerical orders, he took military command of a regiment of one thousand men raised for the reduction of Canada; when they were not paid, he was sent to go to England to entreat for their pay. While he was there, his wife died, and he married Elizabeth Scott, daughter of Rev. Thomas Scott, of Norwich, England. Returning home, he narrowly escaped shipwreck, and spent some months in Antigua before reaching Connecticut.

He was a delegate to the Albany Congress in 1754.

He died at Wethersfield, Connecticut and is buried there. His widow, Elizabeth, became the second wife of William Smith (1697–1769) in 1761.

== Works ==
- Divine grace illustrious, in the salvation of sinner - 1727
- Death the advantage of the godly. – 1728
- The anonymous pamphlet known as Essential rights and liberties of Protestants (1744), is often mis-attributed to Williams. Its full title is,The essential Rights and Liberties of Protestants. A seasonable Plea for The Liberty of Conscience, and The Right of private Judgment, in Matters of Religion, without any Controul from human Authority. Being a Letter from a Gentleman in the Massachusetts-Bay to his Friend in Connecticut. Wherein Some Thoughts on the Origin, End, and Extent of the Civil Power, with brief Considerations on several late Laws in Connecticut, are humbly offered. As is self-evident from the title, the author was from Massachusetts, and could not be Williams. According to the Yale Historian Franklin Bowditch Dexter, the authorship should "perhaps with more reason" be attributed to William's Harvard classmate, Thomas Cushing, then Speaker of the Massachusetts House of Representatives.

== Sources ==
- Roberts, Gary Boyd & William Addams Reitwiesner, American Ancestors and Cousins of The Princess of Wales, Genealogical Publishing Co., Baltimore, Maryland, 1984, p. 59; #242.
- “New England Historical and Genealogical Register (NEHGR).” v. 8; p. 323.

Academic offices
Preceded by Timothy Cutler	Rector of Yale College; 1726–1739	Succeeded by Thomas Clap
