= Jared Elliott (disambiguation) =

Jared Elliott is the head coach of the Western Illinois Leathernecks football team

Jared Elliott may also refer to:

- Jared Elliott, actor who appeared on Next Action Star
- Jared Elliott, chaplain of vessel that explored Elliott Bay during the Wilkes Expedition
- Jared Eliot, (1685–1763), American physician
