= Jared Eliot House =

Historic house in Connecticut, United States

- U.S. National Register of Historic Places
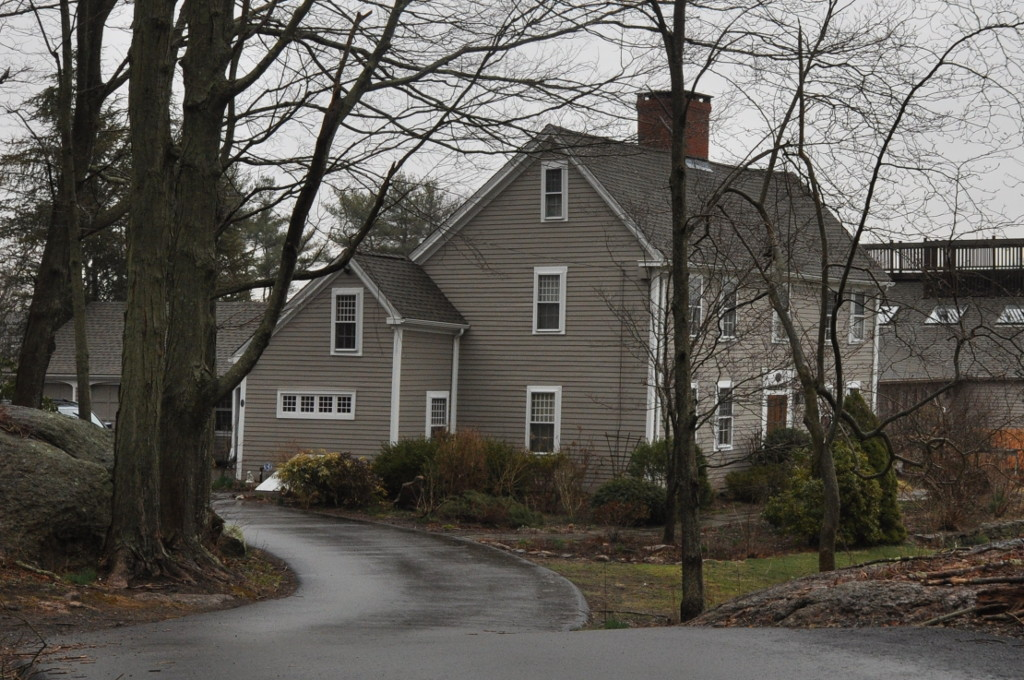

- Location within Connecticut Location within the United States
- Location: 88 Mulbery Farms Road, Guilford, Connecticut
- Coordinates: 41°16′17″N 72°41′17″W
- Area: 2 acres (0.81 ha)
- Built: 1723
- Architectural style: Saltbox
- NRHP reference No.: 85002792
- Added to NRHP: November 14, 1985

The Jared Eliot House is a historic house in Guilford, Connecticut. Built in 1723, it is a well-preserved example of period residential architecture, built by Rev. Jared Eliot, an influential figure in the social and economic life of the community. The house was listed on the National Register of Historic Places in 1985.

== Description and history ==
The Jared Eliot House is located in a rural setting southwest of Guilford Center, on the north side of Mulberry Farms Road, a private lane off Mulberry Point Road. It is oriented facing south, in an area of woodlands and salt marshes that lie west of the West River. It is a 2 1/2-story wood-frame structure, with a side-gable roof, central chimney, and clapboarded exterior. The main facade is five bays wide, with sash windows arranged symmetrically around a center entrance. The entrance is topped by a multilight transom window and corniced entablature. A leanto section extends the rear roof line to the first floor, extending beyond the western side to give that side a "Beverly jog". The interior retains many period features, including original wooden floors and paneling, and doors with original strap or wrought iron hinges.

This house was built in 1723 for Jared Eliot, on land inherited by his wife, Hannah (Smithson) Eliot. An early graduate of Yale College, Eliot served as the minister of the Congregational church in Killingworth, and was also a practicing physician. This house served the family as a summer residence. While here, he conducted research on agricultural practices, in particular seeking to establish the cultivation of mulberry trees, which ultimately gave Mulberry Point its name. He was also interested in the development of iron works, supporting one financially in Salisbury.

== See also ==
- National Register of Historic Places listings in New Haven County, Connecticut
- List of the oldest buildings in Connecticut
