= Samuel Andrew =

American clergyman and educator (1656–1738)

The Reverend Samuel Andrew

Rector of Collegiate School pro tempore
- In office 1707–1719
- Preceded by: Abraham Pierson
- Succeeded by: Timothy Cutler

Personal details
- Born: 29 January 1656 Cambridge, Massachusetts
- Died: 24 January 1738 (aged 81) Milford, Connecticut
- Spouse(s): Abigail Treat, Abigail Beach

Samuel Andrew (29 January 1656 – 24 January 1738) was an American Congregational clergyman and educator.

== Early life ==
Samuel was born in Cambridge, Massachusetts, the eldest child of Samuel and Elizabeth (née White) Andrew. The elder Samuel was a merchant and shipmaster and the master builder of the first Harvard Hall. Elizabeth's step-father, a wealthy Salem merchant named George Curwin, paid for the younger Samuel's education.

He graduated from Harvard College in 1675 and received a master's degree in 1678. He then became a tutor at the college until 1684. He was elected a Fellow of the college in 1679. His students at Harvard included multiple co-founders of Yale (see below) and future Harvard president John Leverett.

== Minister in Milford ==
Reverend Andrew was ordained minister at Milford, Connecticut on 18 November 1685, and served there for the rest of his life. When he arrived in Milford, the congregation was divided over doctrinal issues. The combination of the departure of some dissenters in the 1690s and Reverend Andrew's skills as a minister led to a revival that lasted until his death.

He was one of the ministers who assembled at Saybrook in 1708 by order of the General Court for the purpose of adopting and recommending to the churches a manual of church discipline called the "Saybrook Platform".

== Yale University ==
He was one of the ten ministers who were the founding trustees of the Collegiate School in 1701. According to Yale President Thomas Clapp, writing in 1766, Reverend Andrew and his former students Reverend James Pierpont and Reverend Samuel Russell (who was not one of the original trustees) led the effort to create the new college. One of the several motivations for the new college was concern over the liberalizing of the Harvard education by Andrew's former student, Leverett.

Andrew had close ties to several of his fellow trustees. Reverend Samuel Mather was his brother-in-law. Reverend Timothy Woodbridge was a college classmate. In addition to Pierpont, Noadiah Russell and James Webb were former students.

He served as the rector pro tempore of the Collegiate School between 1707 (the death of Rev. Abraham Pierson, the first rector) and 1719. During his tenure the school was renamed Yale College to honor a gift from Elihu Yale, a governor of the British East India Company. Andrew continued to reside at Milford, loyal to his congregation, teaching the senior students there. He refused to move to Saybrook, Connecticut, or, after the college moved, to New Haven.

== Family ==
His first wife was Abigail Treat (1660-1727), the daughter of Governor Robert Treat and his first wife Jane Tapp. His second wife was the widow Abigail Beach. His daughter Elizabeth married the Rev. Timothy Cutler, who succeeded him as rector of Yale in 1719 and later became the first minister of Old North Church. His daughter Abigail married Governor Jonathan Law.

Academic offices
Preceded by Abraham Pierson	Rector of the Collegiate School pro tempore 1707–1719	Succeeded by Timothy Cutler, as Rector of Yale College
