= Naphtali Daggett =

American academic administrator (1727–1780)

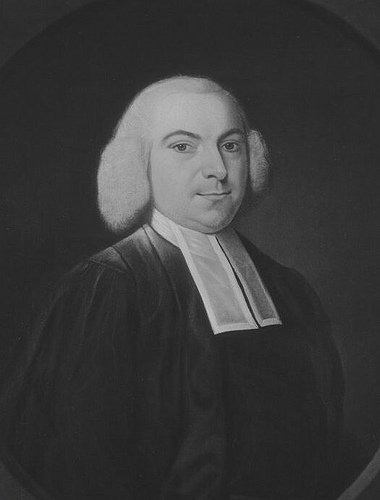
- Rev. Naphtali Daggett

President pro tempore of Yale University
- In office 1766–1777
- Preceded by: Thomas Clap
- Succeeded by: Ezra Stiles

Personal details
- Born: September 8, 1727 Attleborough, Massachusetts
- Died: November 25, 1780 (aged 53) New Haven, Connecticut
- Education: Yale College

Naphtali Daggett (September 8, 1727 – November 25, 1780) was an American academic and educator. He graduated from Yale University in 1748. Three years later, he became pastor of the Presbyterian Church in Smithtown, Long Island. In 1755, the Yale Corporation persuaded him to return to New Haven to assist President Thomas Clapp in the pulpit, and to be considered for appointment as a college professor. On March 4, 1756, the Corporation inducted him as Yale's first professor—officially the Livingstonian Professor of Divinity.

Daggett became the college's president pro tempore in 1766 after the resignation of President Clap. Daggett held the office of President for the next eleven years, until 1777.

When the British attacked New Haven in 1779, Rev. Daggett took up arms in defense but was taken prisoner and forced to serve as a guide. He was bayoneted by his captors, and died in 1780.

== Notes ==
Academic offices
Preceded by Thomas Clap	President of Yale College pro tempore 1766–1777	Succeeded by Ezra Stiles
