= Timothy Cutler =

Episcopal clergyman

The Reverend Timothy Cutler
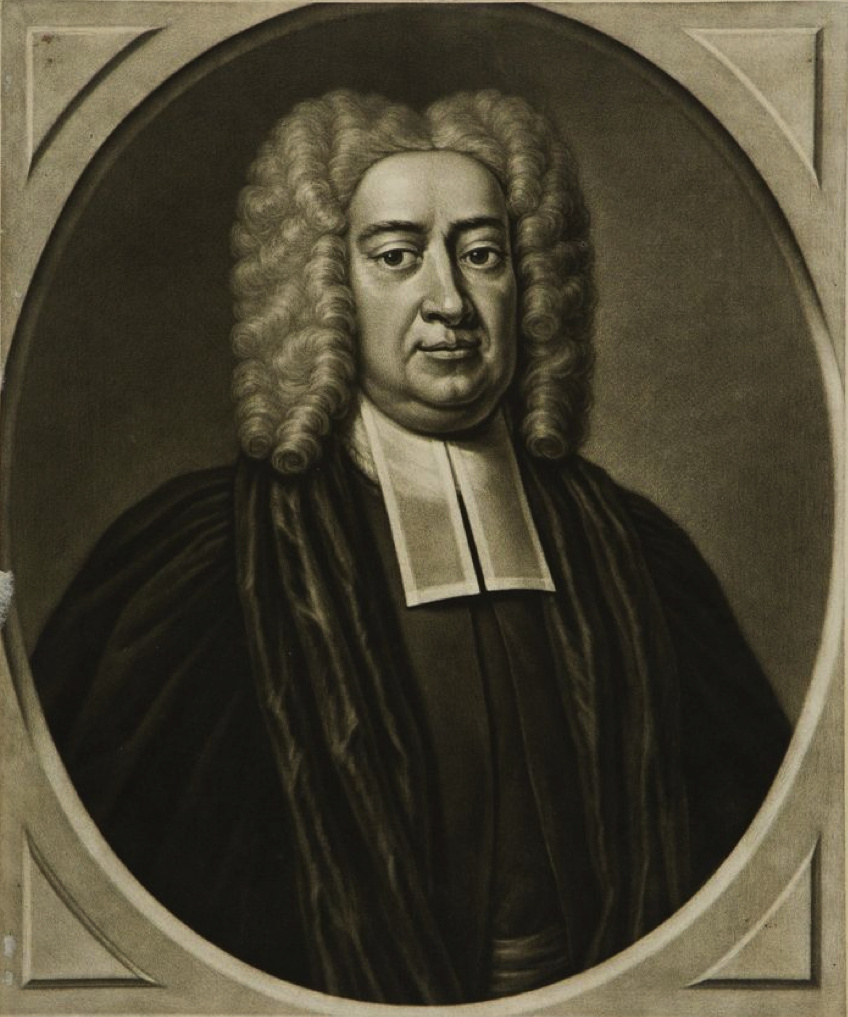
- Portrait of Cutler, 1750, by Peter Pelham

3rd Rector of Yale University
- In office 1719–1726
- Preceded by: Samuel Andrew
- Succeeded by: Elisha Williams

Personal details
- Born: May 31, 1684 Charlestown, Massachusetts
- Died: August 17, 1765 (aged 81) Boston, Massachusetts

Timothy Cutler (May 31, 1684 – August 17, 1765) was an American Episcopal clergyman and rector of Yale College. He was the first rector of Christ Church (today's Old North Church) in Boston's North End, serving from 1723 until his death in 1765.

== Family background ==
Cutler was born in Charlestown, Massachusetts, in 1684, a descendant of Robert Cutler, who settled there prior to October 28, 1636. His father was Major John Cutler, an anchorsmith, and his mother, Martha Wiswall. He was their fifth child. Both his father and grandfather opposed the government formed after the overthrow of Edmund Andros, an early colonial governor in North America, and head of the short-lived Dominion of New England in 1689. Although severely penalized, they refused to subscribe to the government until it had received royal sanction. His ancestors' tendency to conform to the established order suggests a reason for Timothy's subsequent conversion to the Church of England.

== Early life ==
When seventeen years old, Cutler graduated from Harvard College, and on January 11, 1709/10, having come from Massachusetts to Connecticut with the recommendation of being "one of the best preachers both colonies afforded", he was ordained pastor of the Congregational church in Stratford.

On March 21, 1710/11, he married Elizabeth, daughter of Rev. Samuel Andrew of Milford, Connecticut, then acting rector of Yale College. They had eight known children between 1711 and 1722: Martha, John Gibbs, Elizabeth (died young), John, Elizabeth, Timothy, Sarah, Abigail and Ruth. Cutler served his parish acceptably until March 1718/19 when, conditions at Yale College calling imperatively for a resident rector, he undertook that office at the request of the trustees, his appointment being formally approved in September. Although his father-in-law was doubtless instrumental in securing his appointment, Cutler was in general well-fitted for the position, being "an excellent Linguist", a "good Logician, Geographer, and Rhetorician", while "in the Philosophy & Metaphysics & Ethics of his Day or juvenile Education he was great. . . . He was of an high, lofty, & despotic mien. He made a grand figure as the Head of a College". Cutler continued to teach the Enlightenment Curriculum first instituted by Tutor Samuel Johnson in 1716, with courses on algebra, calculus, and moral philosophy.

The new rectorship "opened auspiciously and an era of prosperity seemed at hand when, on September 13, 1722, the rector, with Tutor Daniel Browne and several Congregational clergymen, met with the trustees, declared themselves doubtful of the validity of their ordination, and asked advice with regard to entering the Church of England." Upon request they made a written statement of their position, and the meeting was adjourned for a month. In the meantime Governor Saltonstall arranged a public debate on the matter, held October 16, as a result of which, on the following day, at a special meeting of the trustees, it was voted to "excuse the Rev. Mr. Cutler from all further services as Rector of Yale College", and it was provided that all future rectors and tutors should declare to the trustees their assent to the Saybrook Confession of Faith, and give satisfaction as to their opposition to "Arminian and prelatical corruptions." They returned Yale to its previous orthodoxy, what the former Yale Tutor, the American Dr. Samuel Johnson in 1770 described as "the scholastic cobwebs of a few little English and Dutch systems that would hardly now be taken up in the street.”

Several nineteenth century Harvard and Yale commentators, citing Cutler's Puritan opponents, suggest that Cutler was never wholeheartedly a Dissenter, that he had been converted to Episcopalianism when at Stratford by John Checkley, and that in spite of this fact had accepted the rectorship of a Congregational college, publicly declaring what he had privately believed only when a desirable place in the Established Church was assured him. With the 1929 publication of American Dr. Samuel Johnson's Autobiography, we find that Cutler, Yale Tutor Daniel Brown, and seven other local clergy formed a study group in 1719. Assigning Johnson to translate, and meeting in secret at each other's homes, they carefully studied the source texts in Yale's library in the original languages over a three-year period. They only reluctantly decided that their Presbyterian ordination was questionable, and that an Episcopal ordination was to be preferred. Despite great pressure from Governor Saltenstall, their family, friends and the Puritan community (so fierce, that five of the nine recanted), Cutler, along with three others, determined to become ministers of the Church of England.

== Later life ==
During a yearlong visit to London, Cutler was ordained by the Bishop of Norwich in March 1723. He also received the degree of D.D. from both Oxford University and the University of Cambridge, the first American-born clergyman to receive a Doctorate. Cutler became rector of the newly formed Christ Church, Boston, where he served until his death. Cutler became one of the leading Episcopal clergymen of New England, venerated for his learning, but perhaps too haughty in manner to be popular. He founded the church at Dedham and took care of Christ Church, Braintree.

Puritans, however, dominated Boston. Massachusetts leaned toward a theocracy under Cotton Mather, who defended the conviction of witches on spectral evidence, and Harvard taught a pre-Enlightenment curriculum over 100 years old. While Cutler was away on his ordination trip, Boston's elite had jailed printer James Franklin of The New-England Courant for political attacks, and fined his publisher John Checkley for printing Episcopal books. As the leading Anglican in Massachusetts, Cutler defended the rights of his fellow believers, standing against the Church, State, college theocracy of the Massachusetts Bay Colony. He pushed for the emancipation of his church members from the church tax imposed by the Puritan theocracy. He started a library of Anglican books in his church. With Rev. Samuel Myles of King's Chapel he laid claim to a seat on the Board of Overseers of Harvard, as a minister of the Episcopal Church in Boston, maintaining that he was a "teaching elder" as required by the college charter. Unsurprisingly, both the Overseers and General Court decided against him. Cutler urged a bishop be appointed for the American colonies. He published four sermons, two preached before the Connecticut General Assembly (on May 9, 1717, and October 18, 1719) - a singular honor in the Standing Order of the Puritan Connecticut government - and two while he was Rector of Christ Church, Boston.

== Theology ==
In 1723 Timothy Cutler and others shocked the community of the Yale College by leaving Congregationalism for Anglicanism. The theological issues in dispute related principally to church governance. Besides, the move into Anglicanism involved an embrace of Arminian teachings on salvation as well.

== Death ==
Cutler died in 1765, aged 81.

== Notes and references ==
- "Timothy Cutler", in Dictionary of American Biography Base Set. American Council of Learned Societies, 1928–1936. Reproduced in Biography Resource Center. Farmington Hills, Mich.: Thomson Gale. 2005. http://galenet.galegroup.com/servlet/BioRC

=== Sources ===
- McClymond, Michael J.; McDermott, Gerald R. (2012). The Theology of Jonathan Edwards. New York, NY: Oxford university press.

Academic offices
Preceded by Samuel Andrew, as Rector of the Collegiate School, pro tempore	Rector of Yale College; 1719–1726	Succeeded by Elisha Williams
