= Jared Eliot =

American physician (1685–1763)

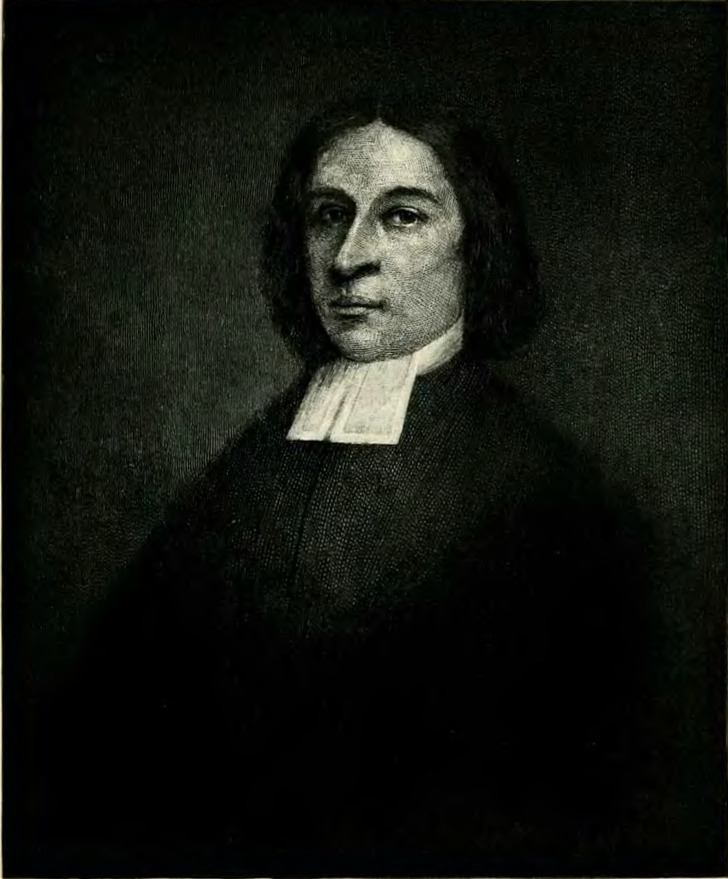
- Born: 7 November 1685
- Died: 22 April 1763
- Education: Yale University
- Occupation: Minister
- Parents: Joseph Eliot (father); Mary Wyllys (mother)

Jared Eliot (November 7, 1685 – April 22, 1763) was an American colonial scientist, minister, and physician. He was born in Guilford, Connecticut, but spent most of his life from 1707 until his death in Killingsworth, now called Clinton, Connecticut. He was a botanist and agronomist who wrote articles on agriculture and animal husbandry as well as a geologist who wrote on the mineral qualities of Connecticut lands, winning recognition in England, where he was given a gold medal by the Royal Society of Arts and unanimously elected a member of the Royal Society. He was considered "the first physician of his day in Connecticut and was the last clerical physician of eminence probably in New England." He was a Yale Trustee from September 1730 until his death, the first Yale graduate to hold that office.

== Ancestry ==
Coat of Arms of Jared Eliot

Eliot's grandfather, John Eliot of Roxbury, Massachusetts, was a missionary to the Massachusett and Wampanoag nations for 40 years who translated the Bible into the Natick language. Jared's father, Joseph Eliot, graduated from Harvard College in 1658. He became the Congregational church minister in Guilford, Connecticut in 1664, and lived there the rest of his life. Joseph was also regarded as a "clerical physician," due to his interest in medicine. Eliot was the eldest son of Joseph Eliot and his second wife, Mary Wyllys.

In 1700, there was considerable interest in establishing a college in Connecticut. The ministers along the shore of Long Island Sound who originated plans for the college began to arrange a meeting of the ecclesiastical General Assembly. The Assembly agreed to meet in October and was asked to create a new charter (the previous charter had expired, along with the Massachusetts Bay Colony). The college advocates stated their initial intentions by the sending of letters. The purpose of these letters was to seek advice “not only on the educational side, but on the highly important matter of the legality of a Connecticut-Colony-granted charter, and if that were to be legal, what should it contain”. Joseph Eliot was among those chosen to devise the charter, including its “powers of conferring degrees as unobtrusive as possible”. The Assembly felt that licensing the new college would not provoke animosity in England. Joseph's voice on behalf of Connecticut was significant to his fellow colonists until his unexpected, early death on May 24, 1694.

== Family ==
Jared's family tree – beginning with his grandfather John Eliot and his wife Hannah – is extensive, with several children from each marriage. John and Hannah Eliot had six children. Their first two children were named after them; Hannah was the firstborn, followed by John. Joseph was born on December 20, 1638. Next was Samuel (born June 22, 1641); however, he died shortly after receiving his advanced degree from Harvard in the 1660s. Aaron, the fifth-born, died at age 11. The youngest child was Benjamin; born in January 1647, he graduated from Harvard and became his father's assistant in teaching the Indians.

Joseph was married twice and fathered four children from each marriage. Joseph first married Sarah, daughter of William and Martha (Burton) Brenton of Rhode Island, in 1676. All of the children borne by Sarah were girls (Mehitabel, Ann, Jemima and Barsheba), and all four daughters married well. Joseph's second marriage was to Mary Wyllys, and Jared was the firstborn of the second marriage; his younger siblings were Mary, Rebecca and Abiel. Both Mary and Rebecca married several times – Mary four times; her last husband was Samuel Hooker of Farmington, Connecticut. Rebecca married three times; her last husband was Capt. William Dudley of North Guilford, Connecticut.

Jared had a difficult childhood, since his father died when he was only eight years old. Since Jared's father and grandfather had both been physicians, he took up the practice. Jared also became a minister, in accordance with his father's dying wish. He determined to live a successful life, to preserve his family's reputation; one of his goals was to “obtain a liberal education in ‘an academic course of studies’”.

== Early life and career ==
Abraham Pierson was a mentor for Eliot. Pierson had graduated from Harvard University in 1668, was ordained by his father Abraham Pierson, the elder, and became minister of the Killingworth Congregational Church in 1694. When he became minister at Killingworth, Pierson began teaching his first classes in the parsonage. He taught in a meeting-house in Killingworth in 1700; this collegiate school is now part of Yale University. Since Pierson was an experienced minister he fell under the purview of the new charter of 1701 which stipulated that the college’s trustees were to be experienced ministers (preferably Congregationalists), residing in the colony. The charter also stated that the mission of the school was the “instruction of youth ‘in the arts and sciences,’ that they might be suitable for ‘public employment, both in church and civil state’”.

Eliot was one of Pierson’s favorite (and best-known) students. Eliot graduated from the Collegiate School (later known as Yale College) in 1706. Due to Jared's intelligence and education, Pierson predicted that he (and Samuel Cooke, another student) would become Yale school trustees; Eliot did so in 1730. In June 1707, Eliot was notified of Pierson’s death; he was ordained on the first of that month, fulfilling his father's wish for one of his sons to become a minister. In September, Jared became the third minister of the Killingworth church. When he assumed the position, the colonists promised that if he were to marry they would give him 60 loads of good firewood each winter. Jared married Hannah Smithson (daughter of Samuel Smithson of Brayfield, England) the following winter, and was minister at the Killingworth church until his death.

In addition to his ministerial duties, Eliot was a physician; he is quoted in an article by Rodney True that “it seems natural that the medical and ministerial professions should be thus combined”. A physician and a minister would be able to heal a person's body, mind and soul; a person combining both professions was known as a "clerical physician", as his father had been. Jared entered the medical profession in 1706, when there were 30 towns in New England with populations over 20,000. His dual role is attested; “it should not be surprising that both great names in Connecticut medicine in the century spanning 1650-1750 belong to the cleric-physicians Gershom Bulkeley and Jared Eliot”. Eliot succeeded Bulkeley as a leader in Connecticut medicine, training about 50 students. He was for a time a slave owner. Eliot's successor as a physician was his son-in-law Benjamin Gale, who received Jared's practice in the mid-1740s. Benjamin was also a skilled physician, with a good reputation, and promoted matters of public welfare.

== Essays Upon Field Husbandry ==
After transferring his medical practice to his son-in-law, Eliot wrote a series of essays on "field husbandry" (primarily agriculture). The first six concerned ways of improving agriculture; the seventh was about iron-making. The first six essays were collected under the title Essays Upon Field Husbandry. The first of the essays was published in 1748, with the following ones in 1749, 1751, 1753, 1754 and 1759. The last essay was delayed because of the French and Indian War. The essay on iron-making was published in 1763. The first three essays were published in New London, Connecticut; essays four and five were published in New York. The sixth agricultural essay was published in New Haven, Connecticut and the iron-making essay was again published in New York. The fact that the essays were published near his home enabled his neighbors and friends to share his accomplishments; “Jared is best seen as a thoughtful and convincing writer”. Jared wrote his essays in a flowing, easily understandable style, describing farming in the light of science. He added a religious overtone, asserting that his creatures were working for the “fulfillment of the kingdom”. Each essay had a different topic, ending with an appropriate Biblical verse.

The first essay concerned land improvement, a concern throughout the colony. In it, Eliot described how land may be reclaimed for farming. Swamps abound with nutrient-rich soil. Draining part of the land (and diverting the water elsewhere) would improve agriculture; the drained land could support red clover, Indian corn, flax, hemp and watermelons without additional fertilizer. Eliot posits that sowing different types of grains – such as oats and peas, or summer wheat and barley – improved the crop of each.

The second essay addressed food production in the colonies. Eliot maintained that contemporary crop use was unwise, and it was time to reevaluate agricultural principles. He contended that the underproduction of hay was leading to an over-dependence on corn as a feed for livestock, thereby driving up the price of corn. Eliot suggested fertilizing, to encourage hay production; “the scarcity and high price of hay and corn is so [evident]…that the necessary stock of the Country hath outgrown the meadows, so that there is not hay for such a stock as the present increased number of people really need”. He also suggested that the present population had outgrown the food supply.

The third essay concerned different species of crops, and its publication increased the variety of crops grown in the challenging New England climate. Eliot stressed that not only grains and grasses could be grown, but fruits and vegetables as well. Many types of grain should be grown, because each has a different purpose: flax, barley, wheat, maslin, colewort seed and rapeseed were mentioned. He explained the different uses of each, and how each contributes to the growth of the colonies. Grasses mentioned are hard grass, spire grass, "foreign artificial" grass and two English grasses: La Lauren and St. Foin. “As we ought to propagate various sorts of Grain and Grass, that so we may have the advantage of all sorts of Land and Seasons, so we should adapt out Tillage to the various sorts if Land which we Improve”.

The fourth essay consisted of discussions of husbandry with other farmers and scientists. Eliot aimed to demonstrate to the colonists that improvements were needed by indicating how alternative techniques were effectively used elsewhere. Other farmers comment to Eliot about how the ideas from his previous essays have affected them; for example, seaweed, wet leaves and sea salt might be used for fertilizer.

The fifth essay concerned problems with tillage (in this case, the land which is worked – by plowing, sowing and harvesting crops). Eliot adapted ideas which had been recently formulated by Jethro Tull, an English writer on tilling. Eliot took some of Tull's inventions and improved them; for example, there had been little improvement in Tull's plow (developed 23 years earlier in England). Eliot attempted to improve Tull's machine, with the aid of President Clap (of Yale College) and Behoni Hillyard, a wheelwright in Killingworth. Eliot's plow was less expensive and easier to use than Tull's plow; however, when he tested his drill plow in the fields he discovered that the wheels did not work well in the rough, rigid soil. After many changes, he finally finished his version of the drill plow; some of his readers remained skeptical, fearing that “The drill plows would never come into general use”.

The sixth essay took longer to write than the others, touching on the production of silk and mulberry bushes. Eliot asserted that his essays reached as far as Great Britain, where his philosophy and ideas were also applied. He wrote, “When I first applied myself to the writing Essays upon Field-Husbandry, I did not expect those small Tracts, calculated to our soil, Meridian, and Climate, would ever extend farther than to a small Circle of Neighbors”. Since the essays had found a wider audience, he thought it would be wise to “apply ourselves to the raising silk”. He asked an anonymous farmer who had been growing silk in New England for years how he did so successfully. Eliot also inquired how the farmer profited from it. He explained the efforts of the Society for the Encouragement of Arts, Manufactures and Commerce to establish silk-making in Connecticut, and speculated on which land in Connecticut (north or south) is better suited to the growth of silk.

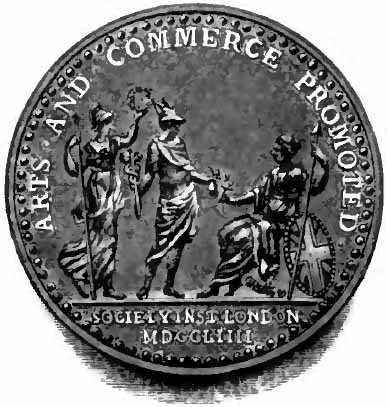
Medal awarded to Jared Eliot in 1762, by the London Institute, “for producing malleable iron from the American black sand.”

The seventh essay was not part of the Essays Upon Field Husbandry, but it concerned a new way to manufacture iron from a substance found in New England. This essay was entitled An Essay On The Invention or Art of Making Very Good, If Not The Best Iron, From Black Sea Sand. Eliot recounted how he experimented with "black sea sand" for use in iron-making. In 1744 Eliot's uncles, Aaron Eliot and Ichabod Miller, succeeded in making more than a half-ton of steel at the furnace in Sansbury. Since the only place to get steel-making materials was New York, there was a need to find sources closer to home. Jared revealed that he was part of a group of investigators who secured an ore bed at Sansbury (by a patent grant from the Great Assembly) to find something to make into iron. This essay concerned the experiments and findings from using black sea sand to make iron.

Eliot's essays were not widely accepted in New England until the 19th century. However, some contemporaries recognized his efforts to improve farming practices. Among those he inspired were Benjamin Franklin and John Adams. Both men felt that Eliot's essays were an important contribution to the development of the colonies. These essays supported colonial interests and imperial designs involving communication with the other colonies and Britain. Eliot also attempted trade with other countries, but was unsuccessful before his death on April 22, 1763. In 1765 the Stamp Act was invoked by the British, and communication between the colonies and Britain became impossible.

== Legacy ==
Two years before his death, Eliot made his will. It stated, “I will and bequeath to the President and Fellows of Yale College, in New Haven, ten pounds of lawful money, the interest of which sum shall be applied to the use of the library, in buying books from time to time, according to their best skill”, this was the first Yale college library fund.

Eliot's house in Guilford, Connecticut, built in 1723, is listed on the National Register of Historic Places.
