= Thomas Clap =

American academic and Congregational minister (1703–1767)

The Reverend Thomas Clap

5th President of Yale University
- In office 1745–1766
- Preceded by: Elisha Williams as rector
- Succeeded by: Naphtali Daggett as pro tempore

Personal details
- Born: June 26, 1703 Scituate, Massachusetts
- Died: January 7, 1767 (aged 63) New Haven, Connecticut
- Education: Harvard College

Thomas Clap or Thomas Clapp (June 26, 1703 – January 7, 1767) was an American academic and educator, a Congregational minister, and college administrator. He was both the fifth rector and the earliest official to be called "president" of Yale College (1740–1766). He is best known for his successful reform of Yale in the 1740s, partnering with the Rev. Dr. Samuel Johnson to restructure the forty-year-old institution along more modern lines. He convinced the Connecticut Assembly to exempt Yale from paying taxes. He opened a second college house and doubled the size of the college.

Yale graduated more students than Harvard beginning in 1756. He introduced Enlightenment math and science and Johnson's moral philosophy into the curriculum, while retaining its Puritan theology. He also helped found the Linonian Society in 1753, a literary and debating society and one of Yale's oldest secret societies. He personally built the first Orrery in America, a milestone of American science, and awarded his friend Benjamin Franklin an honorary degree.

His educational accomplishments were marred by many political, theological, and polity conflicts, with first the New Light faction in Connecticut, then the Anglicans, then the Old Light faction. He fought with the Connecticut Assembly, the Yale board, and finally, with his own tutors and students. He was forced to resign as president of Yale in 1766 and died soon after.

== Early life ==
Clap was born in Scituate, Massachusetts, and studied with Rev. James McSparran, a missionary to Narragansett from the "Society for the Propagation of the Gospel in Foreign Parts", and with Rev. Nathiel Eells, of Scituate. He entered Harvard University (then known as Harvard College) at age 15, graduating in 1722. He preached at Windham, Connecticut, in 1725 and was ordained to succeed the Rev. Samuel Whiting as minister there in 1726, marrying Rev. Whiting's daughter Mary in 1727, and remaining 14 years with a ministry marked by a rather severe orthodoxy (he once traveled to Springfield to oppose the ordination of a minister accused of Arminian tendencies).

== Early years of reform and religious conflict at Yale ==
He was elected rector of Yale College following Elisha Williams's resignation, largely because the trustees believed he would oppose Arminianism at Yale, and was inducted in 1740. His administration was to become known for its orthodoxy, pugnaciousness, authoritarianism, and embroilment in controversy. In 1743, his nephew Nathan Whiting, whom he and his wife Mary had raised after the death of his parents, graduated from Yale. He was learned both in theology and in science and constructed the first orrery in America. After the death of his first wife he married Mary Haynes on February 5, 1740 or 1741.

He was known as a "rigid", "dogmatic and obstinate" leader who used "autocratic methods" to impose discipline at the college. His religious views and personality led to conflict within the school: he objected to the teachings of English minister George Whitefield, an itinerant minister of the Great Awakening, and other itinerant teachers such as Gilbert Tennent. Rev. Joseph Noyes, pastor in New Haven, invited James Davenport to his congregation to preach: Davenport used the opportunity to brand him an "unconverted man" and a "hypocrite": the congregation was eventually physically split, resulting in the two Congregational Churches that still stand on the New Haven Green.

In 1741, two masters' candidates at Yale were denied their degrees for their "disorderly and reckless endeavors to propagate" the Great Awakening, and the college made it an offence for a student to imply that the rector, trustees, or tutors were "carnal or unconverted men" or "hypocrites". It was not long before a student, David Brainerd, did so, saying that Tutor Whittelsey "had no more grace than a chair", and was expelled. Jonathan Edwards, Rev. Aaron Burr (father of the vice-president), and Jonathan Dickinson unsuccessfully appealed for Brainerd's reinstatement.

Clap campaigned for laws to inhibit itinerant preachers and lay exhorters and to stop the disintegration of churches by separation. Religious disputation continued to fragment to student body, who refused to submit to discipline, avoided religious instruction from the "Old Lights" (preachers established before the Great Awakening), and attended separatist meetings. In 1742, Clap closed the college, sending the students home. He was supported by the General Assembly, and many of the more ardent students transferred to other institutions when Yale reopened in 1743.

While he was feuding with the New Lights, Clap was partnering with the Anglicans. Beginning in 1740, he worked with the Rev. Samuel Johnson of Stratford, Connecticut, to reform Yale. He brought math and science into Yale's curriculum, and undergraduate studies in divinity were replaced by Johnson's non-denominational moral philosophy. Clap published a Yale library catalog in 1743, with an index system based on his friend Samuel Johnson's map of learning, and drafted a new charter of the school, granted by the General Assembly in 1745, incorporating the institution as "The President and Fellows of Yale College in New Haven". Clap was sworn in as Yale's first President on June 1, 1745. His formulation of a new code of laws for Yale in Latin became, in 1745, the first book printed in New Haven.

Whitefield returned to New England to preach, and Yale issued "The Declaration of the Rector and Tutors of Yale College against the Rev. Mr. George Whitefield, his Principles and Designs, in a Letter to him". In 1746, Clap expelled Samuel Cooke from the Yale Corporation for his role in setting up the separatist congregation in New Haven.

In May 1747, the General Assembly granted Yale the right to hold a lottery to raise funds: this income, together with the proceeds from the sale of a French boat captured by the colony's frigate, were used to build Connecticut Hall, the second major structure at Yale. It was completed in 1753.

== Later religious conflict ==
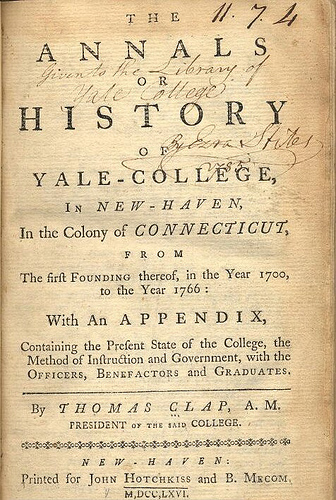
Frontispiece, The Annals or History of Yale College in New Haven, in the Colony of Connecticut, by Yale President Thomas Clap, 1766. Volume carries notation: "Given to the Library of Yale College by Ezra Stiles 1785."

Clap, meanwhile, was concerned by the poor preaching of Joseph Noyes and by the initiation of Anglican services in New Haven. To avoid loss of students to the College of New Jersey (now Princeton), founded by those who had defended Brainerd's expulsion, and to defend orthodoxy, he convinced the trustees to appoint him as professor of divinity and to authorize separate worship for the students each Sunday. Both the Old Lights and the Episcopalians objected to this. In 1753, Rev. Samuel Johnson wrote to Clap that were he to continue with separate worship, the Episcopalians would complain, and that the charter of 1745 would be found to be invalid, as only the King could make a corporation, and that Yale would cease to exist. Clap agreed to let the Anglican students attend their own church.

Perhaps more important to Clap than questions of religion, the New Lights increased their political power in the Connecticut Assembly and the state established Congregational Church. In 1754, Thomas Fitch, an outspoken Old Light, was elected governor, while William Pitkin, who supported the New Lights, was elected deputy governor, and almost all the Connecticut Congregationalist associations and consociations had New Light majorities.

Meanwhile, there were conflicts within the Corporation. Benjamin Gale, son-in-law of Jared Eliot, a corporation member, had published a pamphlet arguing for discontinuation of the colonial grant to the college, and no grant was given in 1755. Clap set out to raise an endowment for a professorship of divinity, and Naphtali Daggett was appointed the Livingstonian Professor of Divinity on March 4, 1756. Noyes offered to share his pulpit with the new professor, agreeing to subscribe to the Assembly's Catechism and the Savoy Confession of Faith, and the students returned to his First Church for worship.

Clap, however, became disenchanted with Noyes' Old Light orthodoxy and poor preaching and obtained a decision that not only could Yale students worship separately, they could form their own congregation and administer Communion. The announcement of the corporation's decision on June 30, 1757, was bitterly controversial, and, in the aftermath, discipline at the college collapsed. The General Assembly intervened, threatened a Yale "visitation". Despite being now distrusted by both Old and New Light factions, Clap's defense of the college as separate from the state caused the assembly to ultimately side with Clap.

He was not so successful with his own tutors and students. The student body was caught up in the rebellious spirit of the 1760s, resolving to drink no "foreign spiritous Liquors any more" and declaiming in chapel against the British Parliament, and petitioning the Corporation with their grievances, insisting on the removal of the disciplinarian Clap. The students stopped going to classes and prayers and generally abused the tutors, who resigned.

The corporation ordered an early spring vacation, and few undergraduates returned. President Clap offered his resignation at the corporation meeting in July 1766. He continued as the head of Yale until commencement on September 10, 1766, when he presided over his last commencement, delivered his valedictory address, and resigned. Professor Naphtali Daggett followed him as president pro tempore.

Clap died four months later in New Haven at the age of sixty-three.

Jackson Turner Main finds that teaching in colonial days was a poorly paid, part-time, temporary job. Young men typically moved on to more secure occupations as soon as possible. There was one great exception: Reverend Clap. At his death he lft an estate worth £6,656, including 600 acres of land. His wealth came from marriage and his attention to lucrative investments.

== Selected works ==
- 1732 – "A Sermon at the Ordination of the Rev. Ephraim Little"
- 1742 – " An Introduction to the Study of Philosophy"
- 1745 – "Letter to a Friend in Boston"
- 1745 – "A Letter to the Rev. Jonathan Edwards"
- 1754 – "The Religious Constitution of Colleges, especially of Yale College"
- 1755 – "History and Vindication of the Doctrines received and established in the Churches of New England"
- 1765 – "Nature and Foundation of Moral Virtue and Obligation"
- 1766 – Annals, or History of Yale College.
- 1781 – Nature and Motions of Meteors

== See also ==
- Education in Connecticut

== Notes ==
Academic offices
Preceded by Elisha Williams	Rector of Yale College; 1740–1745	Succeeded by Defunct
Preceded by New creation	President of Yale College; 1745–1766	Succeeded by Naphtali Daggett, pro tempore
