= Abraham Pierson =

American Congregational minister

The Reverend Abraham Pierson
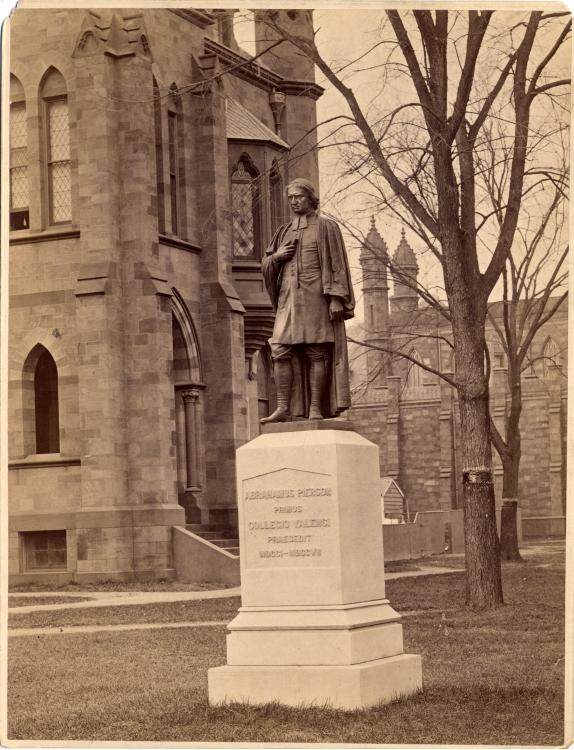
- Statue of Rev. Abraham Pierson, Old Campus of Yale College, circa. 1879

1st Rector of the Collegiate School
- In office 1701–1707
- Succeeded by: Samuel Andrew as pro tempore

Personal details
- Born: 1646 Southampton, Long Island
- Died: March 5, 1707 (aged 60–61) Killingworth, Connecticut

Abraham Pierson (1646 – March 5, 1707) was an American Congregational minister who served as the first rector, from 1701 to 1707, and one of the founders of the Collegiate School — which later became Yale University.

== Biography ==
He was born in Southampton, Long Island, where his father, the Rev. Abraham Pierson (Sr.), was the pastor of the Puritan (Congregational) church. At that time, Southampton and much of eastern Long Island were administered as part of the Connecticut Colony.

It is commonly stated that Abraham Pierson (Jr.) was born in Lynn, Massachusetts Bay Colony in 1640 or 1641. This claim conflicts with his gravestone in present-day Clinton, Connecticut, as well as the period he spent as a student at Harvard College (1664 to 1668).

Around 1647, Abraham's family moved from Southampton to Branford in what is now Connecticut. At that time, Branford was affiliated with the (unchartered) New Haven Colony. The plans to move from Southampton to Branford began in 1644 when Southampton chose to become affiliated with Connecticut instead of New Haven. Abraham's father was the pastor of the Puritan (Congregational) church in Branford from around 1647 to around 1667.

In 1667, Abraham's family moved to New Jersey where his father established the community of New Ark, present-day Newark, New Jersey. At that time, Abraham (Jr.) was a student at Harvard College.

After graduating from Harvard College in 1668, Abraham was ordained a minister and he joined his father in New Ark. After his father's death in 1678, Abraham succeeded his father as pastor of the First Congregational Church in Newark. Abraham also inherited a library of over 400 books from his father.

In 1691, the Congregational Church in Newark apparently chose to become Presbyterian. At that time, Abraham moved to Greenwich, Connecticut, to become the pastor of the First Congregational Church of Greenwich. In 1694, he moved to Killingworth (now Clinton, Connecticut).

Abraham Pierson was the minister of the Killingworth Congregational Church at the same time he started to teach the first classes of what would become Yale University. The new school was supposed to conduct its classes in Saybrook, but the Rev. Pierson could not be relieved of his duties as the pastor in Killingworth; thus, the classes were held in his parsonage.

Abraham Pierson is today interred in Clinton, Connecticut. Abraham Pierson School in Clinton, Connecticut (grades 4–5), was named for him; and a bronze statue of him is located on East Main Street in Clinton, Connecticut.

== Notes ==
For the period of 1646 to about 1664, it has been assumed that Abraham Pierson, as a child, lived with his parents and followed the movements of his father, Rev. Abraham Pierson (Sr.). The Rev. Abraham Pierson Sr., was one of the most prominent figures in the New Haven Colony, and his activities are well-documented in many places, including the following.

a. Winthrop's Journal 'The History of New England' 1630-1649, edited by James Savage, 1853.

b. The Founding of Harvard College, Samuel Eliot Morison, Harvard University Press, Cambridge, Mass., 1935, pages 91 and 396.

c. The History of Long Island, Peter Ross, Lewis Historical Publishing Co., New York, NY, 1902.

d. A History of the City of Newark, New Jersey, Lewis Historical Publishing Co., New York, NY, 1913

e. Pierson Millennium, by Richard E. Pierson and Jennifer Pierson, Heritage Books, October 1997. ISBN 0-7884-0742-2.

1. Notes of lectures attended at Harvard College, Abraham Pierson, Cambridge, Massachusetts, 1667, Beinecke Library, Yale University, New Haven, Conn.
2. Rev. Abraham Pierson, Jr.'s tenure as pastor of the First Congregational Church of Greenwich is remembered in one of the stained-glass windows of the current edifice of that congregation.
3. Rev. Abraham Pierson, Jr.'s residency in Killingworth, Connecticut (present day Clinton) is documented in every history of Yale College, as well as a bronze statue and an elementary school.
4. Dictionary of American Biography, by Johnson, Allen and Malone, Dumas (editors), Volume 14, Pages 588–589. "It is commonly stated that Abraham the younger was born at Lynn, Mass. in 1641, but according to his tombstone in the graveyard at Clinton, Conn., he "deceased March ye 5th 1706/7 aged 61 years."
5. Early Connecticut Marriages as found on Ancient CHURCH Records Prior to 1800, by Frederick W. BAILEY, New Haven, Vol 2, 1896. These records show that the Rev. Abraham Pierson (Sr.) continued to perform weddings in Branford long after he moved to Newark. See
6. This collection of books clearly pre-dates a comparable collection bequeathed to this school by Elihu Yale. Was this collection donated to the Collegiate School, thus forming the first component of the present-day Yale University Library?
7. The Founding of Yale College, by Bruce P. Stark, Connecticut Heritage Gateway.

Academic offices
Preceded by New creation	Rector of the Collegiate School; 1701–1707	Succeeded by Samuel Andrew, pro tempore
