= Elihu Club =

Senior society at Yale University, US

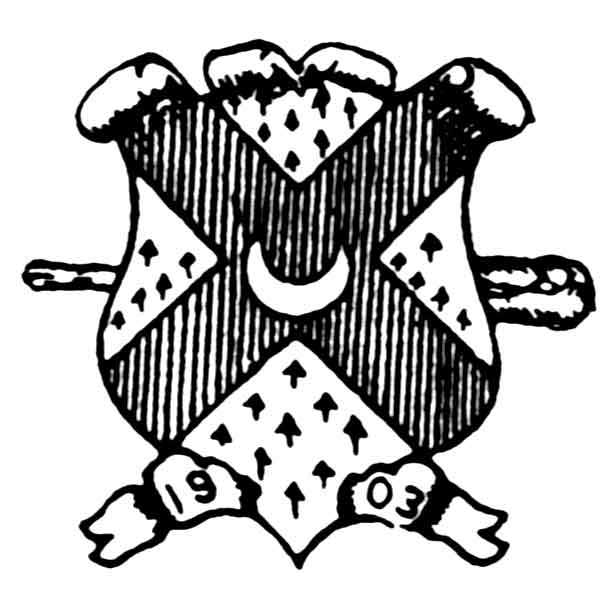
- Founded: 1903; 123 years ago Yale University
- Type: Senior society
- Affiliation: Independent
- Status: Active
- Scope: Local
- Chapters: 1
- Nickname: Elihu
- Headquarters: 175 Elm Street; New Haven, Connecticut 06511; United States
- Website: www.elihu.org

Elihu Club or Elihu is the fifth oldest senior society at Yale University, New Haven, CT. It was founded in 1903 and takes its name from Elihu Yale. Elihu is one of the "ancient eight", which includes Mace and Chain, Book and Snake, Berzelius, St. Elmo’s Society, Scroll and Key, Skull and Bones, and Wolf’s Head Society.

== History ==
The Elihu Club was founded by eleven students in 1903 as an "open senior society", rather than a secret society. At the time, this was considered in "variance with accepted traditions" at Yale and "an interesting democratic innovation." The society derives its name from Elihu Yale, who was the primary benefactor of Yale College. Its purpose is: "To foster among its members, by earnest work and good fellowship a stronger affection for Yale; a broader view of undergraduate life and its aims; a deeper and more helpful friendship for one another; and to give its members, after graduation, an additional tie to bind them to Yale and each other."

The Elihu Club of New Haven incorporated with the State of Connecticut in June 1903. The first delegation of tapped members was from the class of 1904 and included Arthur Williams Allen, Edwin Clapp, Edward Chappel Ely, Thomas Robert Gaines, Chauncey Shafer Goodrich, Harry Thomas Hamilton, Charles Simonton McCain, Carleton Shaw, Henry Hamlin Stebbins Jr., George Frederick Victor Jr., and Paul Bessal Welles.

In October 1903, Elihu Club added six additional members from the class of 1904, including seniors Coleman Curtis, Everett Dominick, Harry L. Foote, Joseph H. Holmes, Lawrence Mason, and Robert L. Smitley. For the 1904 to 1905 academic year, the club rented the home of Mrs. Francis G. Beach on Wall Street.

In 1911, the club purchased a colonial-era house which looks out on the New Haven Green. It is considered a landed society because it owns a building on campus. Like the other societies, the organization's building is typically closed to non-members.

While similar to Skull and Bones, Scroll and Key and Wolf's Head societies in charter and function, Elihu favors privacy over secrecy and is considered a "left-wing" society. Because it allows all members of the junior class to interview for membership, the Yale Daily News notes that, "Elihu is considered to be less prestigious." However, in May 1912, three men turned down invitations to secret societies in favor of Elihu Club, including baseball player Harold Carhart, football player Elmer McDevitt, and Edward Stevens. In the spring of 1913, the sophomore class at Yale held a protest against secret societies; Elihu denied suspicions that it started the student protest.

Elihu's normal meetings are held each Thursday and Sunday of the academic year. Its activities are similar to that of the other landed senior secret societies: personal histories or biographies and perspectives are shared among the current delegates. Its programs also include topical essays on pertinent issues, personal bonding time, and group reflection activities.

By 1982, Elihu gained a reputation for admitting racial minorities. In May 1982, the fifteen members of Elihu refused to tap any new members because of a dispute with the alumni who wanted to start charging new members $350. Elihu Club began admitting women in 1971.

Starting in 2002, the club hosts the annual Elihu Yale Lecture which features notable speakers. Architect, planner, and Elihu members Alexander Garvin presented the first lecture in 2002. The 2005 lecture was delivered by actor Sam Waterston, also an Elihu member.

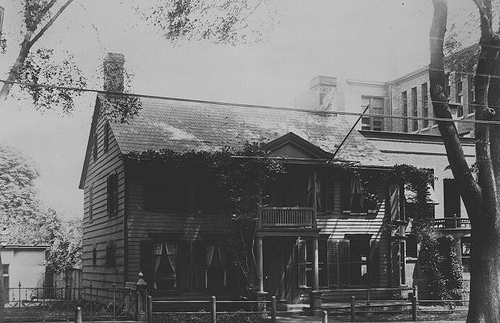
Elihu's house in the early 20th century

== Symbols ==
Members of Elihu Club received a pin.

== Club house ==
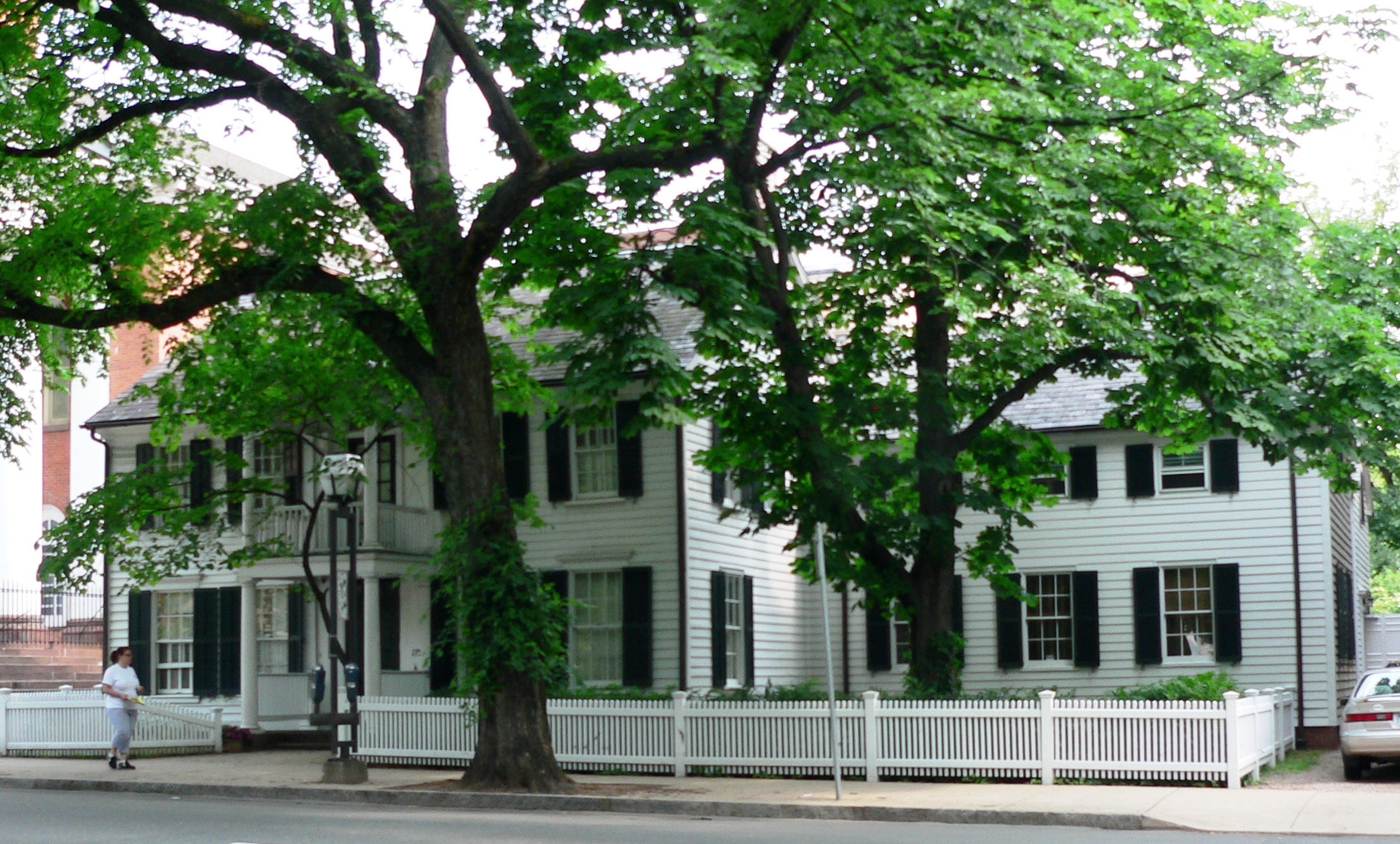
Elihu's house

Elihu Club is housed in a three-story white clapboard house built between 1762 and 1776 at 175 Elm Street. This house is the oldest of all of Yale's secret society buildings, and purportedly one of the oldest original structures in the United States still in regular use. Its brick basement is older still, constructed in the early 17th century, and later frequented by colonists sympathetic to the English cause when it became known as the Tory Tavern, a central locale of the Revolutionary War. In 1781, the town of New Haven confiscated the building from its Loyalist owner, Nicholas Callahan, for his activities.

The club expanded the Federal style building to the rear several times and now includes 12,726 square feet (1,182.3 m^{2}). The building is among the largest of the societies, belying the modest clapboard facade. It contains two single guest rooms in addition to beds for all the current undergraduate members, as well as a large formal meeting room, a library, a formal dining room, and an informal 'tap room' in the basement. The club also has a section of the old Yale Fence in its basement, a relic from the famous structure removed in 1888.

The building has windows, though they are blinded.

== Membership ==
Originally, Elihu had no limit on the number of members that could be tapped in a given year; its only rule was that these men not be a member of the other secret societies: Scroll and Key, Skull and Bones, and Wolf's Head. As a result, Elihu waited to invite its new members after Tap Day for the other societies. However, its founders estimated that between ten and twenty students would be tapped each year, along with worthy Yale graduates from the past twenty or thirty years. In May 1920, the club changed its recruitment policy and participated in Tap Day with the secret societies.

Starting as an all-male organization, Elihu now also has female members. Annually, sixteen rising seniors are elected into the membership of Elihu during the spring tap process. Selection is performed behind closed doors, in keeping with the other major societies. The society invites all members of the junior class to participate in its interview process. However, consideration for membership in Elihu is given to those juniors in the college who are nominated by undergraduate and alumni members.

From its earliest days, the Elihu Club has favored members who leaned toward literary pursuits, acting, teaching, and the law. Elihu Society's taps among the Yale class of 1914, for instance, included Rufus King, president of the Yale Dramatic Association, and Newbold Noyes Jr., chairman of the Yale Literary Magazine.

For some, Elihu was appealing because it was different from Yale's secret societies. Joseph Lieberman was courted by Skull and Bones, even though he wrote editorials critical of the society in the Yale Daily News. Lieberman wrote, "Heresy of all heresies, it would be wonderful if, as a symbolic gesture, the societies someday put windows in their buildings. No other institution seems to separate the haves from the have-nots so forcefully in the eyes of students." Lieberman rejected Bones in favor of Elihu, whose building had windows. Jacob Weisberg, was offered membership in Skull and Bones by Senator John Kerry. Weisberg declined, citing Bones' exclusion of women. Weisberg was persuaded by Robert G. Kaiser to join Elihu instead.

== Notable members ==
- Henry Roe Cloud (1910) – educator, college administrator, and U.S. federal government official
- Lloyd Cutler (1936) - White House Counsel
- Alexander Garvin (1962) – urban planner
- James Goodale (1955) – vice president and general counsel for The New York Times
- Rowland Hazard III (1903) – businessman and politician
- Loyd Kaufman (1968) – film director
- Robert G. Kaiser (1964) – journalist and author
- Rufus King (1914) – novelist
- Eugene Kingman (1932) – painter, muralist, and museum director
- Arthur Bliss Lane (1916) – diplomat
- Jacques Leslie (1968) – author and journalist
- Joseph Lieberman (1964) – United States Senator
- Elmer McDevitt (1912) – football player and coach
- Paul Monette (1967) – poet, author, and gay rights activist
- Edward Lyman Munson (1892) – U.S. Army Medical Corps General
- Newbold Noyes Jr. (1914) – journalist, newspaper editor, and publisher of the Washington Evening Star
- Judith Schiff (Honorary) – archivist
- David Shire (1959) – songwriter
- Stuart Symington (1923) – United States Senator
- John Templeton (1934) – investor, banker, fund manager, and philanthropist
- Sam Waterston (1962) – actor
- Jacob Weisberg (1986) – journalist and editor
- Maury Yeston (1967) – composer, lyricist, and music theorist

== Popular culture ==
- The sharing of personal stories became a plot device in a movie directed by Elihu member Alan Hruska (1955), who jettisoned a career as a trial lawyer to become a film director. Hruska's 2009 film Reunion explored a mythical reunion of fellow society members some 23 years after graduation, and was loosely inspired by a gathering of his Elihu delegation.
- In a March 2000 essay on Yale's societies, Jacques Leslie recalled learning he would be tapped for Skull and Bones. "I was leaning towards Elihu, the sole above-ground society that was headquartered in an actual frame house with windows." When the Bonesmen arrived to tap Leslie, he shouted "Reject!" The surprised expression on the Bonesman's face was printed on the following day's second front page of The New York Times with the caption "Skull was first but he chose Elihu."

== See also ==
- Collegiate secret societies in North America
