= Skull and Bones =

Secret society at Yale University, US

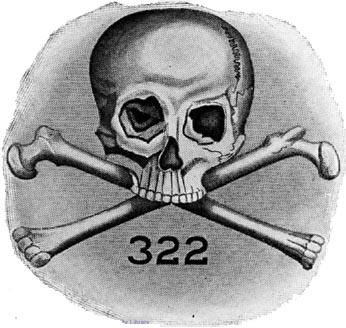
- Founded: December 1832; 193 years ago Yale University
- Type: Senior society
- Affiliation: Independent
- Status: Active
- Scope: Local
- Chapters: 1
- Members: 2,800+ lifetime
- Nickname: Bones, The Order, Order 322, The Brotherhood of Death
- Headquarters: 64 High Street; New Haven, Connecticut 06511; United States

Skull and Bones (also known as The Order, Order 322 or The Brotherhood of Death) is an American undergraduate senior society at Yale University in New Haven, Connecticut. Established in 1832, it is the oldest senior-class society at the university and is considered one of the "Big Three" and "Ancient Eight" at Yale University. Skull and Bones has attracted public attention for its prominent alumni and the conspiracy theories surrounding the society.

== History ==
=== 19th century ===
Skull and Bones was founded in December 1832 after a dispute among Yale debating societies Linonia, Brothers in Unity, and the Calliopean Society over that season's Phi Beta Kappa awards. William Huntington Russell and Alphonso Taft co-founded "The Order of the Skull and Bones". The first senior members included Russell, Taft, and thirteen other members.

The first extended description of Skull and Bones, published in 1871 by Lyman Bagg in his book Four Years at Yale, noted that "the mystery now attending its existence forms the one great enigma which college gossip never tires of discussing."

In a 1974 book, Brooks Mather Kelley attributed the interest in Yale senior societies to the fact that underclassmen members of then freshman, sophomore, and junior class societies returned to campus the following years and could share information about society rituals, while graduating seniors were, with their knowledge of such, at least a step removed from campus life.

Since its founding, Skull and Bones annually selects fifteen junior class members to join the society. Skull and Bones selects new members among students every spring as part of Yale University's "Tap Day", and has done so since 1879. It taps those it views as campus leaders and other notable figures for its membership.

=== 20th century ===
In the 1960s, secret societies adapted in response to criticism for elitism and discrimination. Skull and Bones admitted its first black member in 1965, and the president of Yale's gay student organization in 1975.

Yale became coeducational in 1969, prompting some other secret societies such as St. Anthony Hall to transition to co-ed membership, yet Skull and Bones remained fully male until 1992. The Bones class of 1971's attempt to tap women for membership was opposed by Bones alumni, who dubbed them the "bad club" and quashed their attempt. "The issue", as it came to be called by Bonesmen, was debated for decades.

The class of 1991 tapped seven female members for membership in the next year's class, causing conflict with the alumni association. The trust changed the locks on the Tomb and the Bonesmen instead met in the Manuscript Society building. A mail-in vote by members decided 368–320 to permit women in the society, but a group of alumni led by William F. Buckley obtained a temporary restraining order to block the move, arguing that a formal change in bylaws was needed. Other alumni, such as John Kerry and R. Inslee Clark, Jr., spoke out in favor of admitting women. The dispute was highlighted on an editorial page of The New York Times. A second alumni vote, in October 1991, agreed to accept the Class of 1992, and the lawsuit was dropped.

=== 21st century ===
In recent years, Skull and Bones, like other elite Yale institutions, "utterly transformed", according to The Atlantic. The society tapped its first entirely non-white class in 2020. Few descendants of alumni get in, and progressive activism is an asset. The class of 2021 admitted no conservatives.

Skull and Bones is of the "Big Three," which includes Scroll and Key and Wolf's Head, and the "Ancient Eight" which includes Book and Snake, Elihu, Berzelius, Mace and Chain, and St. Elmo’s.

== Symbols and traditions ==
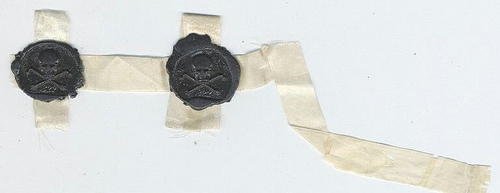
Skull and Bones wax seals, circa 1865

The society's badge is gold and consists of a skull that is supported by crossed bones, with the number 322 on the lower jaw. Its members worshipped Eulogia, a fictional goddess of eloquence. Nicknames for Skull and Bones are The Order, Order 322, and The Brotherhood of Death. The society is known informally as "Bones" and members are known as "Bonesmen", "Members of The Order" or "Initiated to The Order".

The number "322" appears in Skull and Bones' insignia and is widely reported to be significant as the year of Greek orator Demosthenes' death. A letter between early society members in Yale's archives suggests that 322 is a reference to the year 322 BC and that members measure dates from this year instead of using anno Domini. In 322 BC, the Lamian War ended with the death of Demosthenes, and Athenians were made to dissolve their government and establish a plutocratic system in its stead, whereby only those possessing 2,000 drachmas or more could remain citizens. Documents in the Tomb have purportedly been found dated to Anno-Demostheni.

One legend is that the number represents "founded in '32, 2nd corps", referring to a first Corps in an unknown German university. Another possible reference of 322 is the Freemasonic Lodge of Virtue and Silence no. 322, in Suffolk, England, signaling a fraternal but unspoken sponsorship between the two "secret society" organizations, regarding which silence is considered virtuous. Lodge 322 was founded in 1811, 21 years before the creation of the Skull and Bones association in 1832.

=== Crooking ===
Skull and Bones has a reputation for stealing keepsakes from other Yale societies or campus buildings; society members reportedly call the practice "crooking" and strive to outdo each other's "crooks". The society has been accused of possessing the stolen skulls of Martin Van Buren, Geronimo, and Pancho Villa. In January 2010, Christie's canceled a planned auction for a human skull with links to Skull and Bones.

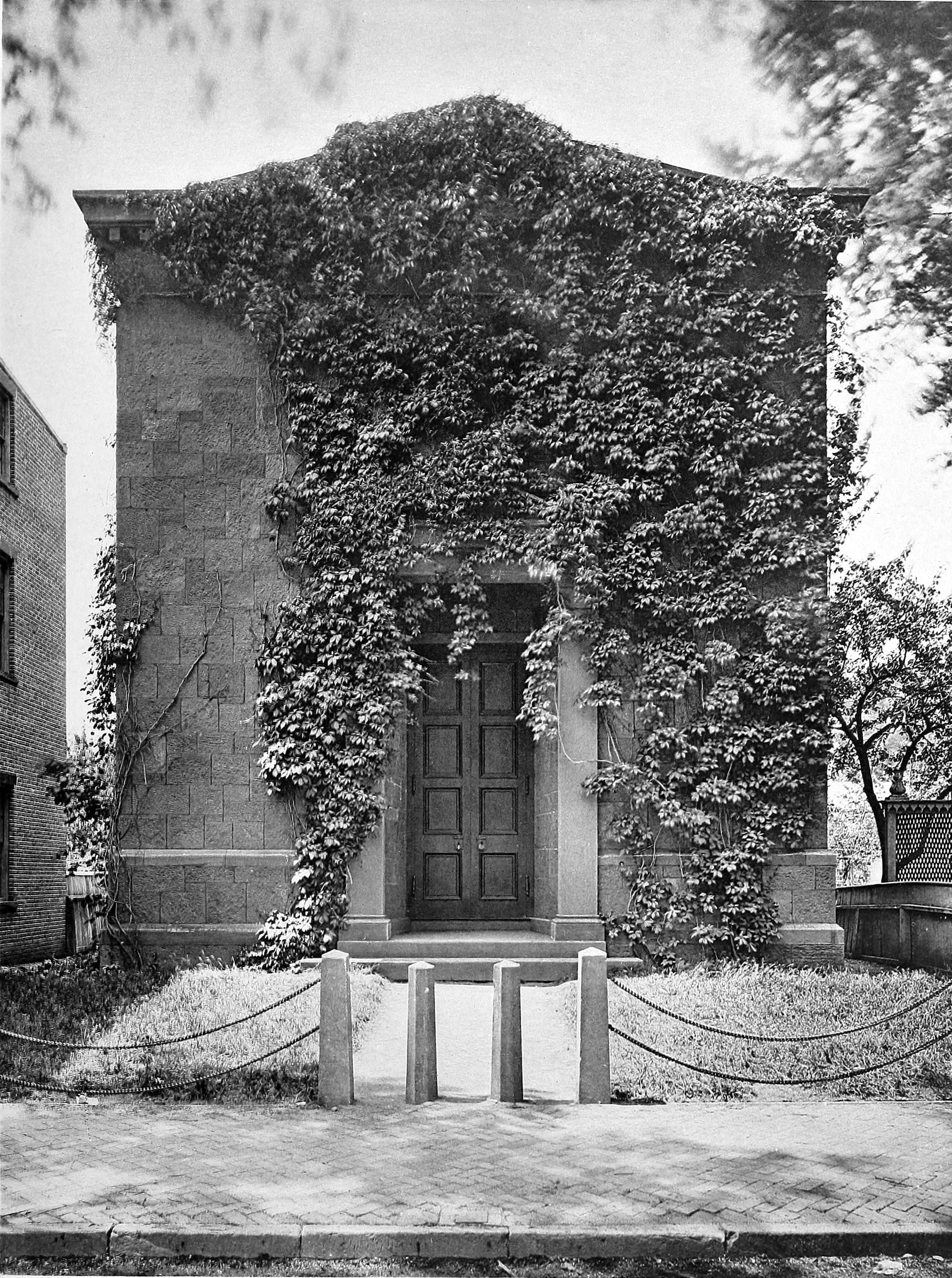
The tomb before the addition of a second wing

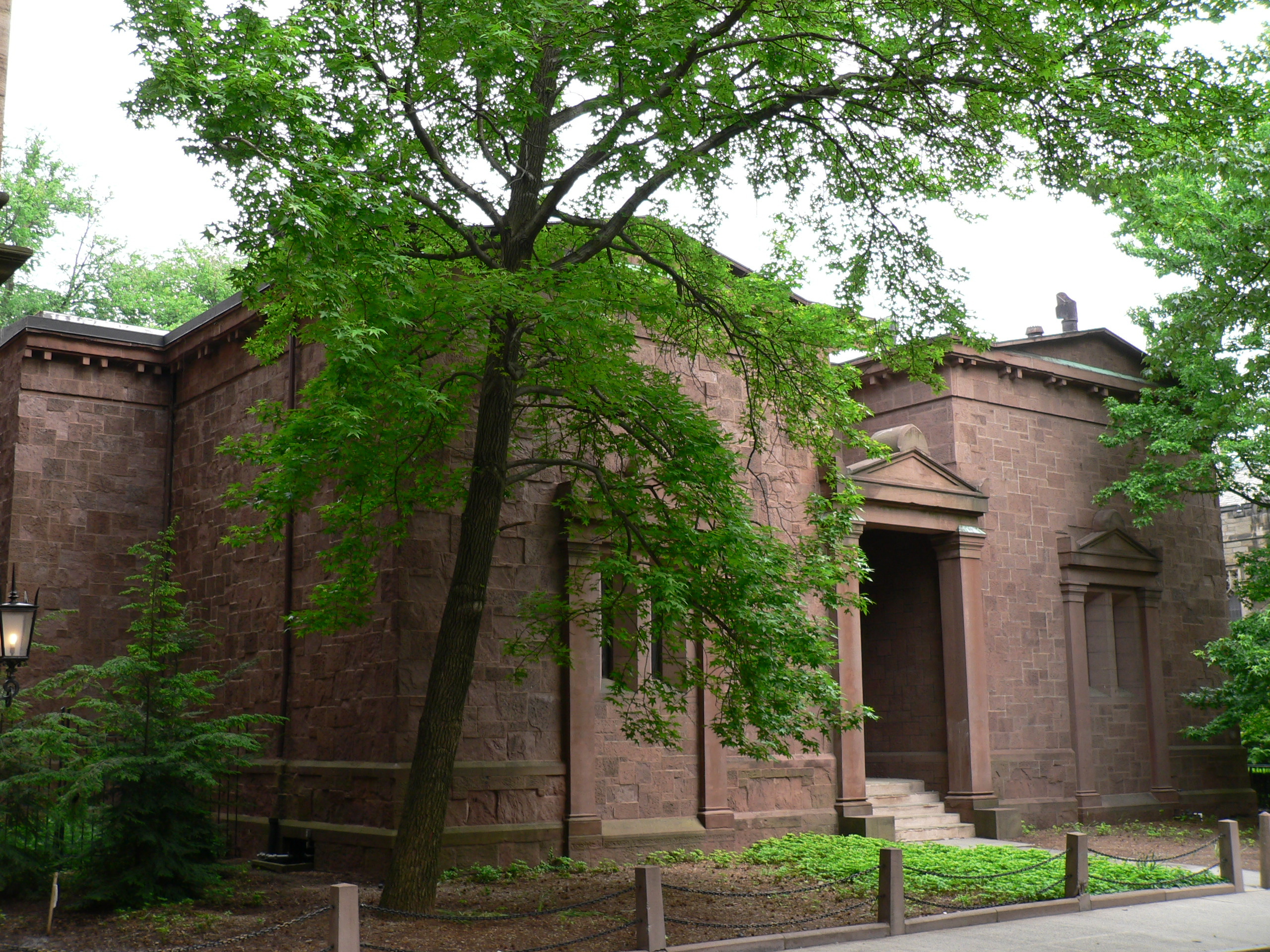
A 2009 view of the tomb from across High Street

== Facilities ==
=== Tomb ===
The Skull and Bones Hall, located at 64 High St. in New Haven, Connecticut, is otherwise known as the "Tomb". The building was built in three phases: the first wing was built in 1856, the second wing in 1903, and Davis-designed Neo-Gothic towers were added to the rear garden in 1912. The front and side facades are of Portland brownstone in an Egypto-Doric style. The architect was possibly Alexander Jackson Davis or Henry Austin. Architectural historian Patrick Pinnell includes an in-depth discussion of the dispute over the identity of the original architect in his 1999 Yale campus history. Pinnell speculates that the re-use of the Davis towers in 1911 suggests Davis's role in the original building and, conversely, Austin was responsible for the architecturally similar brownstone Egyptian Revival Grove Street Cemetery gates, built in 1845. Pinnell also discusses the Tomb's aesthetic place in relation to its neighbors, including the Yale University Art Gallery.

The 1912 tower additions created a small enclosed courtyard in the rear of the building, designed by member Evarts Tracy and Edgerton Swartwout of Tracy and Swartwout, New York. In the late 1990s, New Hampshire landscape architects Saucier and Flynn designed the wrought iron fence that surrounds a portion of the complex.

=== Deer Island ===
Skull and Bones members spend a week in the late summer getting to know one another at Deer Island. The society owns and manages Deer Island, an island retreat on the St. Lawrence River (44.359063°N 75.909345°W). Alexandra Robbins, author of a book on Yale secret societies, wrote:

The forty-acre retreat is intended to allow Bonesmen to "get together and rekindle old friendships." A century ago the island sported tennis courts and its softball fields were surrounded by rhubarb plants and gooseberry bushes. Catboats waited on the lake. Stewards catered elegant meals.

— "George W., Knight of Eulogia"

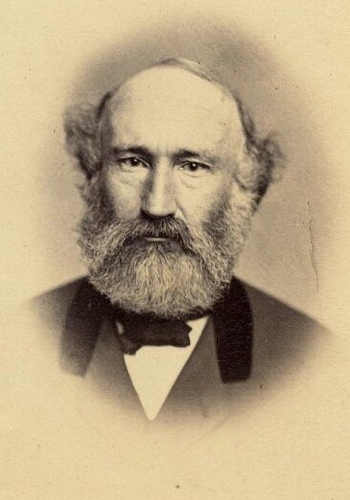
William Huntington Russell, namesake of the Russell Trust Association

== Russell Trust Association ==
The Russell Trust Association is the business name of Skull and Bones Society. It was incorporated in 1856 by William Huntington Russell as president and Daniel Coit Gilman as treasurer. The association is a 501c(3) and holds the society's assets, including its endowment and property, and oversees property upkeep.

According to its 2016 filing with the IRS, the Russell Trust Association, filing as RTA Incorporated, has assets of $3,906,458, including Deer Island and the Skull and Bones Hall. As of 2024, the organization had an endowment of $17 million.

== Notable members ==
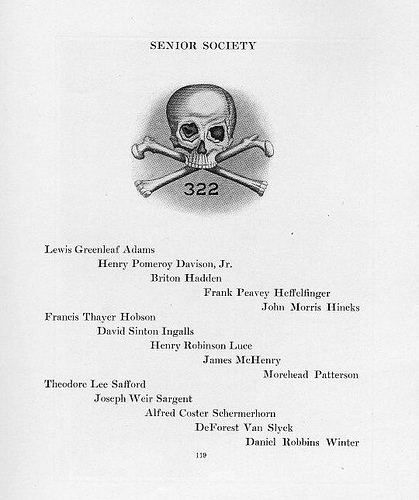
Yearbook listing of Skull and Bones members for 1920, including Briton Hadden and Henry Luce, who co-founded Time magazine in 1923

Skull and Bones' membership developed a reputation in association with the "power elite". Regarding the qualifications for membership, Lanny Davis wrote in the 1968 Yale yearbook:

If the society had a good year, this is what the "ideal" group will consist of: a football captain; a Chairman of the Yale Daily News; a conspicuous radical; a Whiffenpoof; a swimming captain; a notorious drunk with a 94 average; a film-maker; a political columnist; a religious group leader; a Chairman of the Lit; a foreigner; a ladies' man with two motorcycles; an ex-serviceman; a negro, if there are enough to go around; a guy nobody else in the group had heard of, ever ...

Like other Yale senior societies, Skull and Bones's membership was almost exclusively limited to white Protestant men for much of its history. While Yale had exclusionary policies directed at particular ethnic and religious groups, the senior societies were even more exclusionary. While some Roman Catholics were able to join such groups, Jews were more often not. Some of these excluded groups eventually entered Skull and Bones using sports, through the society's practice of tapping standout athletes. Star football players tapped for Skull and Bones included the first Jewish player (Al Hessberg, class of 1938) and African-American player (Levi Jackson, class of 1950), although Jackson declined the tap, instead electing to join Berzelius.

Judith Ann Schiff, chief research archivist at the Yale University Library, has written: "The names of its members weren't kept secret‍—‌--that was an innovation of the 1970s--but its meetings and practices were." While resourceful researchers could assemble member data from these sources, in 1985, Charlotte Thomson Iserbyt provided author Antony C. Sutton with rosters and records that had belonged to her father, a member of the organization. Sutton held this membership information privately for over fifteen years, as he feared that the photocopied pages could somehow identify the member who leaked it. The information was reformatted as an appendix in the book Fleshing out Skull and Bones, a compilation published in 2003.

Prominent alumni include three former U.S. presidents: William Howard Taft (a founder's son), George H. W. Bush, and George W. Bush. In the 2004 presidential election, both the Democratic and Republican nominees were members of Skull and Bones. When asked what it meant that both he and George W. Bush were Bonesmen, former presidential candidate John Kerry said, "Not much, because it's a secret."

Members are assigned nicknames. Examples include "Long Devil", the tallest member, "Boaz", a varsity football captain, and "Sherrife", the prince of the future. Many of the chosen names are drawn from literature (e.g., "Hamlet", "Uncle Remus") religion, and myth. The banker Lewis Lapham passed on his nickname, "Sancho Panza", to the political adviser Tex McCrary. Averell Harriman was "Thor", Henry Luce was "Baal", McGeorge Bundy was "Odin", and George H. W. Bush was "Magog".

== Popular culture ==
=== Literature and print ===
- Tom Wolfe mentions Skull and Bones in his 1976 book, The Me Decade, writing, "At Yale, the students on the outside wondered for 80 years what went on inside the fabled secret senior societies, such as Skull and Bones. On Thursday nights one would see the secret society members walking silently and single file, in black flannel suits, white shirts, and black knit ties with gold pins on them, toward their great Greek Revival temples on the campus, buildings whose mystery was doubled by the fact that they had no windows."
- Skull and Bones have been satirized from time to time in the Doonesbury comic strips by Garry Trudeau, Yale graduate and Scroll and Key member. There are overt references, especially in 1980 and December 1988, concerning George H. W. Bush, and again when the society first admitted women.
- George W. Bush wrote in his autobiography, "[In my] senior year I joined Skull and Bones, a secret society; so secret, I can't say anything more."
- Leigh Bardugo explores the secret societies of Yale, including Skull and Bones, in her dark fantasy horror novel Ninth House.

=== Film ===
- The Skulls (2000) and The Skulls II (2002) films are based on the conspiracy theories surrounding Skull and Bones. A third film, The Skulls III (2004), is based on the first woman to be "tapped" to join the society.
- In The Good Shepherd (2006) the protagonist becomes a member of Skull and Bones while studying at Yale.
- In Baz Luhrmann's 2013 film version of F. Scott Fitzgerald's novel The Great Gatsby, Nick Carraway calls Tom Buchanan "Boaz". Tom in turn calls Nick "Shakespeare". Nick said earlier that he met Tom at Yale. It is thereby implied that they were in Skull and Bones together. In the novel, Yale is not explicitly mentioned; rather, they were at college in New Haven together, and it is only stated that they were in the same senior society.

=== Television ===
- In Season 1, Episode 33 of the 1966 Batman TV series, "Fine Finny Fiends," there is a gathering at Wayne Manor during which one guest points out a portrait of Bruce Wayne's great-grandfather wearing a Yale sweater. He asks if it is true that Bruce's ancestor was tapped for Skull and Bones, to which Aunt Harriet replies that he was not tapped for it, but "he founded Skull and Bones!"
- In The Simpsons season 8 episode "The Canine Mutiny" (1997), after doing a secret handshake with a dog, Mr. Burns says: "I believe this dog was in Skull and Bones".
- In Family Guy episode, "No Chris Left Behind", (2007) when Chris Griffin is being bullied by the richer students at Morningwood Academy, Lois Griffin asks her father, Carter Pewterschmidt, to help Chris. So Carter invites Chris to join Skull and Bones with the other students, who begin to accept him. As part of his initiation, Carter and Chris adopt an orphan and lock him out of the car, which is filled with toys and a puppy, and then drive away when he is unable to get in. At the initiation ceremony, Carter tells Chris that he must spend "Seven minutes in heaven" with their most senior member, Herbert. Chris feels uncomfortable about joining and convinces Carter to help him get back into his old school.
- On Meet The Press, Tim Russert asked both President George W. Bush and John Kerry about their memberships in Skull and Bones, to which the president replied, "It's so secret we can't talk about it." Kerry replied, "You trying to get rid of me here?"
- In The Simpsons season 28 episode "The Caper Chase" (2017), Mr. Burns visits the Skull and Bones society to meet with Bourbon Verlander about for-profit universities.
- In Gossip Girl season 2 episode "New Haven Can Wait" (2008), Chuck Bass is kidnapped by Skull and Bones members while visiting Yale. They make him pass a series of tests to assess his loyalty as they think Chuck is the ideal Skull and Bones candidate. Chuck eventually declines the offer and tricks them into performing illegal acts while filming them to have blackmail leverage in case he ever needs something from them in the future.
- The 1970 television movie The Brotherhood of the Bell, starring Glenn Ford, is a paranoid conspiracy thriller centered around the title organization that strongly resembles Skull and Bones.

== Conspiracy theories ==
Skull and Bones is featured in books and movies which claim the society plays a role in a global conspiracy for world control. There have been rumors that Skull and Bones is a branch of the Illuminati or that Skull and Bones controls the CIA.

== See also ==
- Collegiate secret societies in North America
- List of senior societies
