= Scroll and Key =

Secret society at Yale University, US

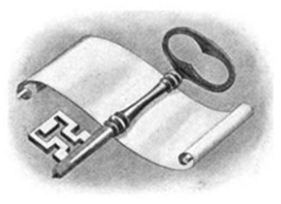
- Founded: 1842; 184 years ago Yale University
- Type: Senior society
- Affiliation: Independent
- Status: Active
- Scope: Local
- Member badge
- Chapters: 1
- Nickname: Keys
- Headquarters: 484 College Street; New Haven, Connecticut 06511; United States

The Scroll and Key Society is a secret society at Yale University in New Haven, Connecticut. Founded in 1842, it is one of the oldest Yale secret societies and is reputedly the wealthiest. Each spring the society admits 15 rising seniors to participate in its activities and carry on its traditions.

== History ==
Scroll and Key was established in 1841 by twelve members of the class of 1842 after dissatisfaction over elections to Skull and Bones Society. Its founders included John Addison Porter, Leonard Case Jr., Theodore Runyon, and William L. Kingsley. After ten years, the number of members was expanded to fifteen.

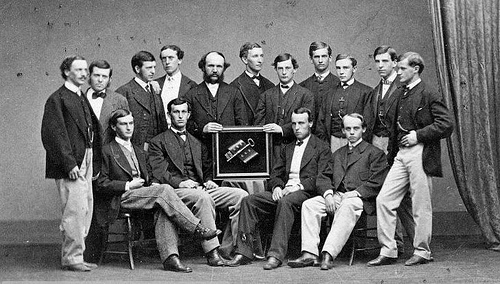
Members of the 1866 delegation

Lyman Hotchkiss Bagg wrote that "up until as recent a date as 1860, Keys had great difficulty in making up its crowd, rarely being able to secure the full fifteen upon the night of giving out its elections." However, the society was on the upswing: "the old order of things, however, has recently come to an end, and Keys is now in possession of a hall far superior...not only to Bones hall but to any college-society hall in America."

Scroll and Key was incorporatored as the Kingsley Trust Association, with the following incorporators: Lebbeus C. Chapin, Calvin G. Child, Josiah W. Harmer, George C. Jackson, William Kingsley, Charlton Thomas Lewis, Samuel C. Perkins, John Addison Porter, Homer B. Sprague, and Enos N. Taft.

The society is one of the "Big Three", which also includes Skull and Bones and Wolf's Head, and the "Ancient Eight" which adds Book and Snake, Elihu, Berzelius, Mace and Chain, St. Elmo’s.

== Traditions ==
At the close of Thursday and Sunday sessions, members are known to sing the "Troubadour" song on the front steps of the Society's hall, a remnant of the tradition of public singing at Yale. The song (written in the 1820s by Thomas Haynes Bayly) was recorded by Tennessee Ernie Ford on his 1956 album, This Lusty Land, as "Gaily the Troubador".

In keeping with the practice of adopting secret letters or symbols such as Skull and Bones' "322," Manuscript Society's "344," and The Pundits' "T.B.I.Y.T.B," Scroll and Key is known to use the letters "C.S.P. and C.C.J." Members of the society sign letters to each other "YiT", as opposed to Skull and Bones' "yours in 322".

Outside of its tap-related activities, the society has been known to hold three major annual events called "Z Session".

== Building ==
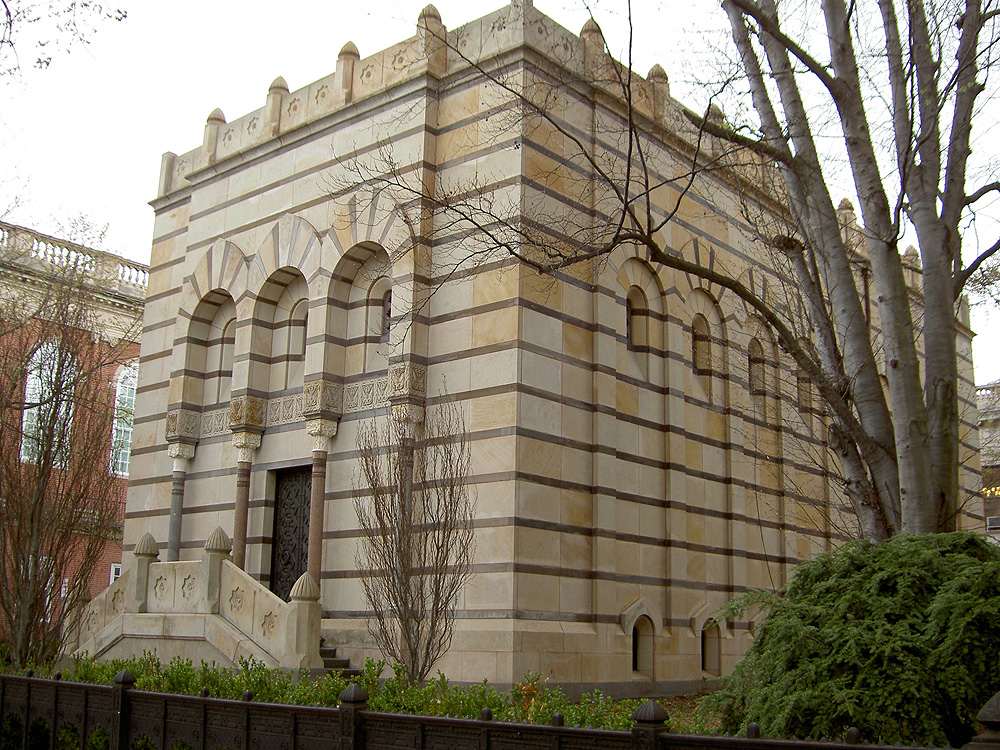
Scroll and Key's tomb

Tomb during its expansion, 1901

The society's building was designed in the Moorish Revival style by Richard Morris Hunt and constructed in 1870. A later expansion was completed in 1901. Architectural historian Patrick Pinnell includes an in-depth discussion of Keys' building in his 1999 history of Yale's campus, relating the then-notable cost overruns associated with the Keys structure and its aesthetic significance within the campus landscape. Pinnell's history shares the fact that the land was purchased from another Yale secret society, Berzelius (at that time, a Sheffield Scientific School society).

Regarding the tomb's distinctive appearance, Pinnell noted that "19th-century artists' studios commonly had exotic orientalia lying about to suggest that the painter was sophisticated, well traveled, and in touch with mysterious powers; Hunt's Scroll and Key is one instance in which the trope got turned into a building." Later, undergraduates described the building as a "striped zebra Billiard Hall" in a supplement to a Yale yearbook. More recently, it has been described by an undergraduate publication as being "the nicest building in all of New Haven".

== Membership ==
Scroll and Key taps annually a delegation of fifteen students in the junior class to serve the following year. Membership is offered to a diverse group of highly accomplished juniors, specifically those who have "achieved in any field, academic, extra-curricular, or personal".

Mark Twain was an honorary member, under the auspices of Joseph Twichell, Yale College Class of 1859.

== Gifts to Yale ==
The Kingsley Trust Association funds the John Addison Porter Prize, awarded annually since 1872. This prize is "given for a written work of scholarship in any field in which it is possible, through original effort, to gather and relate facts and/or principles and to make the product of general human interest." In 1917, Keys established the endowment for the Yale University Press, which has funded the publication of The Yale Shakespeare and sponsored the Yale Series of Younger Poets.

In 2026, members established the Keys New Haven Engagement Endowment Fund to support sustained service initiatives and engagement with the broader New Haven community.

== See also ==
- Collegiate secret societies in North America
