= Charles James Freeborn =

American Army officer

- Died: 14 February 1919; Paris, France
- Education: Yale University
- Military career
- Allegiance: United States
- Branch: United States Army
- Rank: Captain
- Commands: First World War

Charles James Freeborn (died February 13, 1919) was an American military officer who was one of the earliest men from Yale University to volunteer for active service in World War I.

Freeborn graduated Yale University in 1899, where he was a member of the St. Elmo Society. He was a captain in the United States Army, and a recipient of the Croix de Guerre from the French for his service. After the War ended, four years of active service left him too weak to recover from influenza, and, as a result, pneumonia ensued. On February 13, 1919, three weeks after his demobilization, Freeborn died in his home in Paris. He is buried in Oakland, California at Mountain View Cemetery.
