= Mace and Chain =

Senior society at Yale University

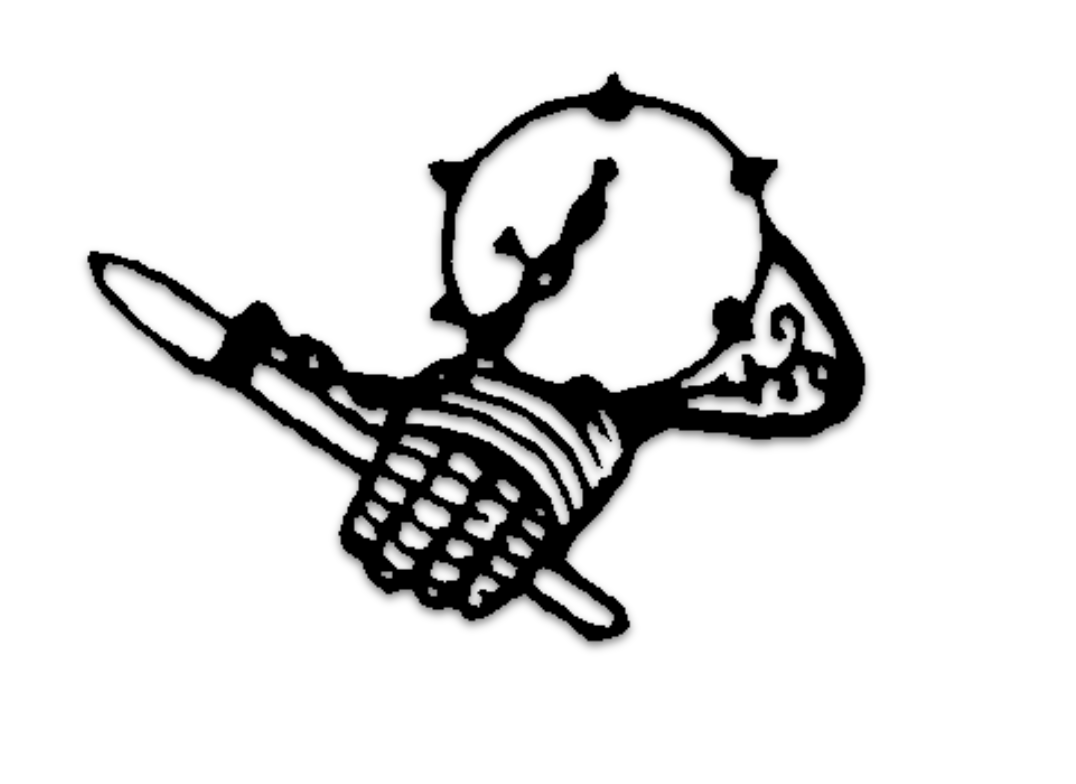
- Founded: 1956; 70 years ago Yale University
- Type: Senior society
- Affiliation: Independent
- Status: Active
- Scope: Local
- Chapters: 1
- Members: 300+ lifetime
- Nickname: M&C, Knights
- Headquarters: Trumbull Street; New Haven, Connecticut; United States
- Website: http://50trumbull.com

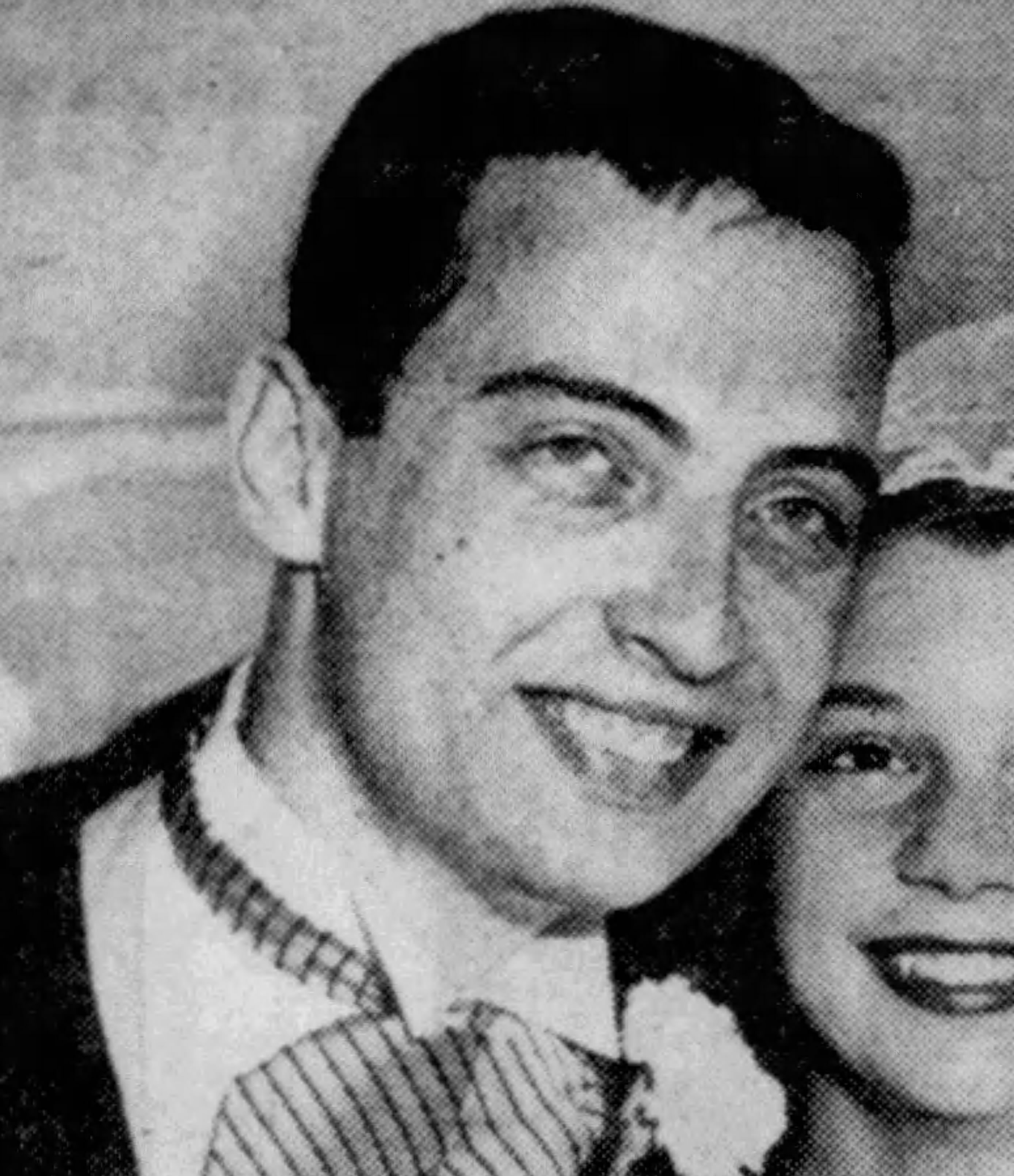
Thornton Marshall, founder of Mace and Chain

Mace and Chain is a secret senior society at Yale University in New Haven, Connecticut. Founded in 1956 and revived in 1993, it is the youngest of the "Ancient Eight," the college's most selective senior societies. Mace and Chain has a clubhouse, or tomb, on Trumbull Street.

== History ==
=== Founding ===
Yale University junior Thornton Marshall founded Mace and Chain in 1956 after he failed to receive an invitation to join a secret student society and watched his friend receive offers from Skull and Bones and Wolf's Head Society. Marshall said that after no one came to tap him, he dressed up “tapped” himself in a mirror and decided to start a society anyway. Marshall recruited about half a dozen friends the same night to launch Mace and Chain.

Mace and Chain forged ties with interested professors as part of its early model. Yale professor Robert Penn Warren gave Marshall advice on structuring the society as "something which is a little closer to reality and that can exist in the sunlight". Thus, Marshall's goal was to create a senior society that would be more representative of the campus community.

The group met in an apartment on Wall Street, above George and Harry's restaurant. The society rotated its leadership every week.

=== Inactivity ===
Mace and Chain became inactive in the 1960s, not long after it was founded, largely after losing the lease on its on-campus apartment during a period of financial strain as well as the Vietnam War. With the loss of that space, the society’s routine functions appear to have ceased, including tapping new members and holding meetings, as it could no longer sustain its physical foothold or basic administration.

The organization then remained dormant for decades. A later historical timeline places Mace and Chain among the groups that dissolved on May 1, 1970, during the upheaval surrounding May Day weekend at Yale. In narratives of that era’s campus unrest, Mace and Chain is described as one of the “underground” societies that disappeared amid wider turmoil and declining attention to internal Yale institutions. Available accounts describe it as effectively defunct throughout the 1970s and 1980s and into the early 1990s, with no documented activity or membership during that span.

=== Revival ===
In 1993, Mace and Chain was revived by alumni members Tom Haines and William "Biff" Folberth. Its revival was financially supported by alumni. Their participation helped revive the society in the 1990s, when the children of former members came to Yale and recruited new members, supporting the restoration. The first class of the reformed society included five male and five female seniors. Although sometimes called a secret society, the reformed Mace and Chain's membership is listed annually in a campus publication.

Mace and Chain is the youngest of the “Ancient Eight” (formally called the "Elite Eight"), Yale's most selective senior societies, along with Berzelius Society, Book and Snake, Elihu Club, St. Elmo’s Society, Scroll and Key, Skull and Bones, and Wolf’s Head Society. In 2007, the society had more than 300 alumni. According to a 2025 article, Mace and Chain along with Wolf's Head Society and Berzelius, are the most secretive among the Ancient Eight.

== Symbols ==
The society's emblem reflects its founders' discussions about chivalry, Mace and Chain's emblem depicts a medieval-style armored gauntlet grasping a spiked mace, rendered in a bold black-and-white outline with an ornamental pattern on the arm. Mace and Chain’s charter was described as deliberately more modern than its medieval imagery.

Mace and Chain's nicknames are M&C and Knights.

== Tomb ==
Mace and Chain is a "landed" society because it owns its meeting place or "tomb". It is the youngest society at Yale to own a building. The tomb serves primarily as the venue for the society's rituals, meetings, and informal gatherings, consistent with traditions among Yale's landed societies where such buildings function as private clubhouses shielded from public view.

When the society was reestablished in 1993, the it initially occupied a succession of condominiums provided by alumni. In 2001, the alumni gave the society an historic house on Trumbull Street in downtown New Haven. As of 2025, the exact address of the Mace and Chain tomb has not been publicly disclosed. However, the tomb is a late Colonial and early-Victorian style house that was in built in 1823 with salvaged moldings from Benedict Arnold's home.

== Membership ==
Mace and Chain recruits new members during Yale's traditional Tap Night, the culmination of the annual spring Tap Week. Before tap night, the "Ancient Eight" collectively agree on a date they can begin providing "bids" to juniors during the Spring. A bid indicates that the society will tap or induct the receiving student, though the receiver does not have to accept the tap until Tap Night. Mace and Chain selects about fifteen rising seniors each year. The society has appeared among the societies signing The Yale Daily News tap-season rule declaration that pledged “to avoid any hazing” throughout the tap process.

The society was one of the earliest to adopt coeducational membership after its revival in 1993, with its first delegation including five men and five women. Its members are chosen to reflect a wide range of interests and backgrounds. Past members have included members of The Whiffenpoofs, athletic captains, and the editor in chief of the campus newspaper. However, because the society operates privately and keeps many of its internal practices confidential, it does not publish information about the specific criteria or process it uses to select new members.

== Activities ==
Like other senior societies, Mace and Chain has been reported to meet twice weekly (traditionally on Thursdays and Sundays). Those meetings have been described as involving “bios,” long-form personal confessionals shared within the delegation. A former member of Mace and Chain reported to the Yale Daily News that they got "to know people, their core, [and] their life story."

Mace and Chain alumni sustain long-term engagement with the society by organizing events and providing resources to current members, such as annual Christmas dinners at the Yale Club of New York, theater tickets, and catered gourmet meals for special occasions. The Yale Daily Herald described alumni support as reciprocal, reporting that Mace and Chain members were expected to take advantage of Yale cultural resources such as the Beinecke collections before graduating.

== Governance ==
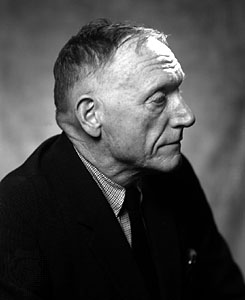
Robert Warren

The society operates with “very dynamic bylaws,” allowing each delegation flexibility in shaping internal structures and practices. According to one report, the society’s early direction was reinforced after two-time Pulitzer Prize winner Robert Penn Warren offered guidance that encouraged faculty input and a structure in which every member would have a chance to serve as president. Graduates report that older members remain engaged in a supportive, nonintrusive way while leaving current delegations broad freedom to set their own rules and activities.

== Knights Trust Inc. ==
Knights Trust Inc. is the alumni organization of Mace and Chain. The Knights Trust incorporated in Connecticut. The U.S. Internal Revenue Service recognized Knights Trust Inc. as a nonprofit 501(c)(3) entity in April 1996.

Knights Trust Inc. owns 50 Trumbull Street in New Haven. The two-story, colonial-style single-family home has ten rooms and 3,502 square feet. Originally purchased for $450,000 in August 2005, the house was valued at $816,300 in 2025.

According to publicly available IRS Form 990 filings, Knights Trust Inc reported total assets of about $1.05 million in its fiscal year ending June 2025, with no liabilities reported. In the fiscal year ending June 2024, the organization reported assets of about $997,000, again with no liabilities.

== Notable members ==
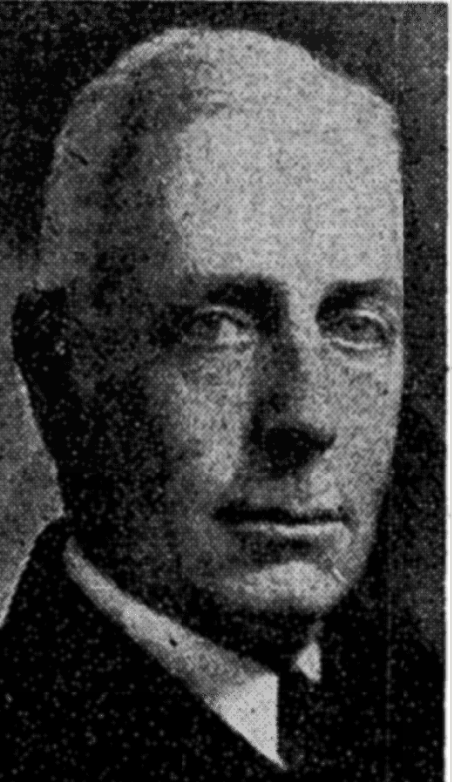
Charles Brinley

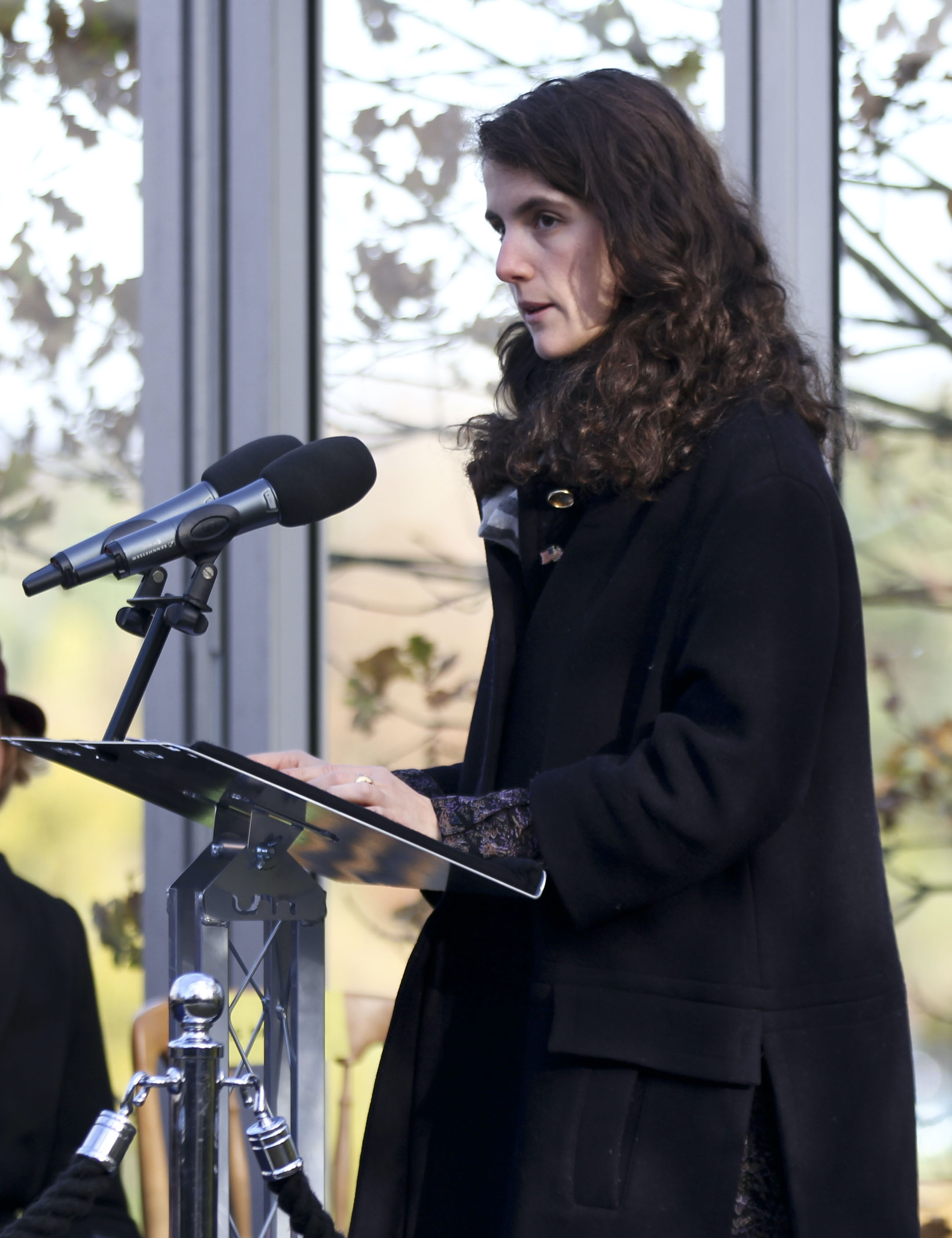
Tatiana Schlossberg

Name	Yale class	Notability	Ref.
Kenny Agostino	2014	Professional ice hockey player and member of the 2022 U.S. Olympic team.	
Emma Allen	2010	Youngest and first female cartoon editor for The New Yorker, at the age of 29.	
Charles Edward Brinley II	1963	CEO of Westmoreland Resources, Dominion Terminal Associates, and later of CETOA, an international coal-terminal consortium.	
George Cook	2012	Acting director of the U.S. Census Bureau while also serving as chief of staff in the U.S. Department of Commerce’s economic affairs office.	
Ashley Edwards	2012	Forbes 30 Under 30 Social Entrepreneur, CEO of Mind Right, one of only 35 to raise over $1 million in venture capital in the U.S.	
Dan Katz	2010	First deputy managing director of the International Monetary Fund and chief of staff to the United States secretary of the treasury	
John Miller	1964	U.S. Congressman and United States Ambassador-at-Large to Monitor and Combat Trafficking in Persons	
Ifeoma Ozoma	2015	Tech policy expert and whistleblower advocate; key architect of California’s Silenced No More Act	
Tatiana Schlossberg	2012	Environmental journalist and author; granddaughter of President John F. Kennedy	
David Shimer	2018	Author and foreign policy analyst who served on the United States National Security Council during the Biden administration	

== See also ==
- Collegiate secret societies in North America
- List of senior societies
