= Berzelius Society =

Secret society at Yale University, US

Coordinates: 41.3130°N 72.9221°W

- BZ
- Founded: 1848; 178 years ago Yale University
- Type: Senior society
- Affiliation: Independent
- Status: Active
- Scope: Local
- Chapters: 1
- Former name: Colony Club
- Headquarters: 78 Trumbull Street; New Haven, Connecticut 06510; United States

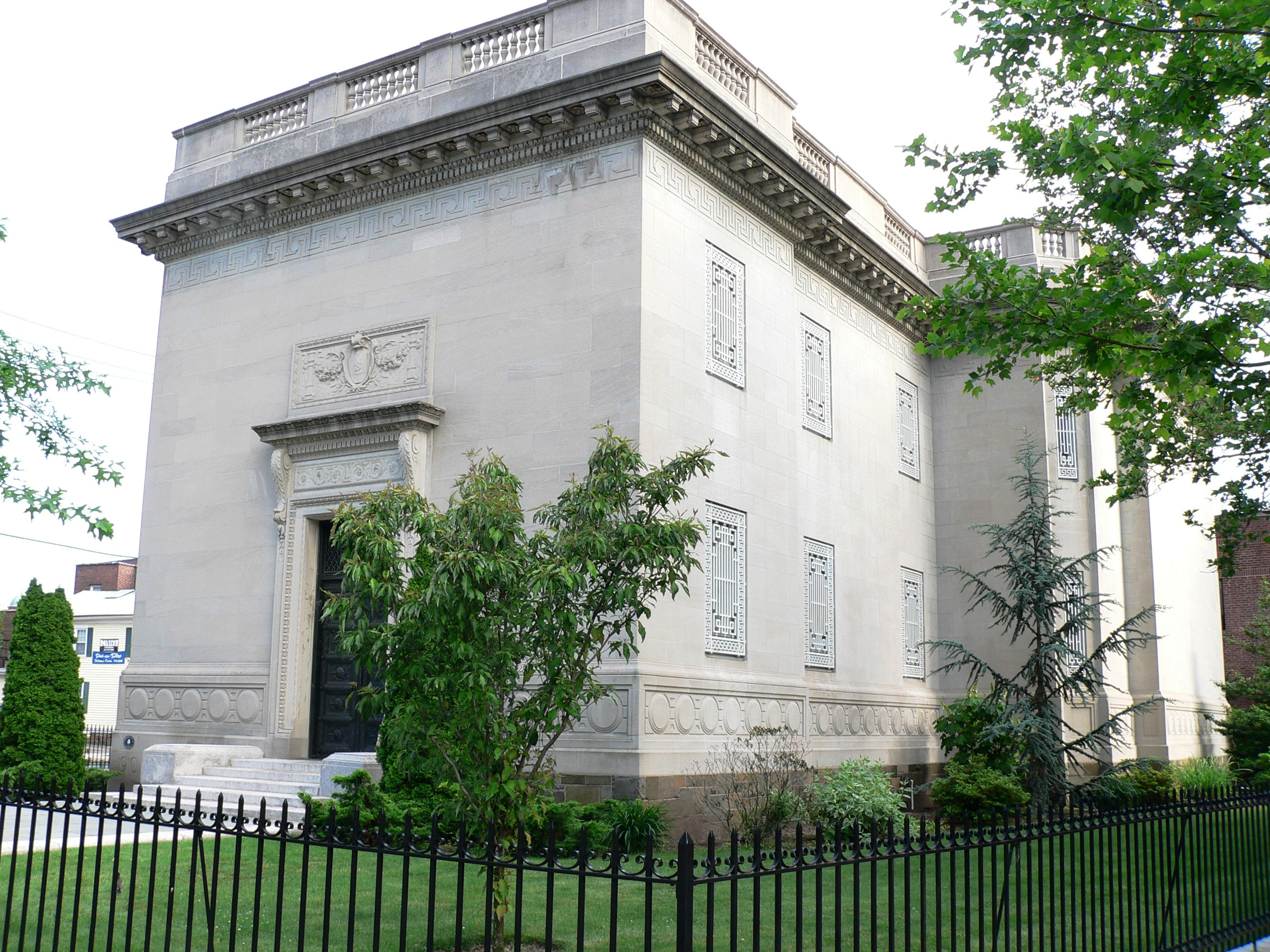
Berzelius tomb

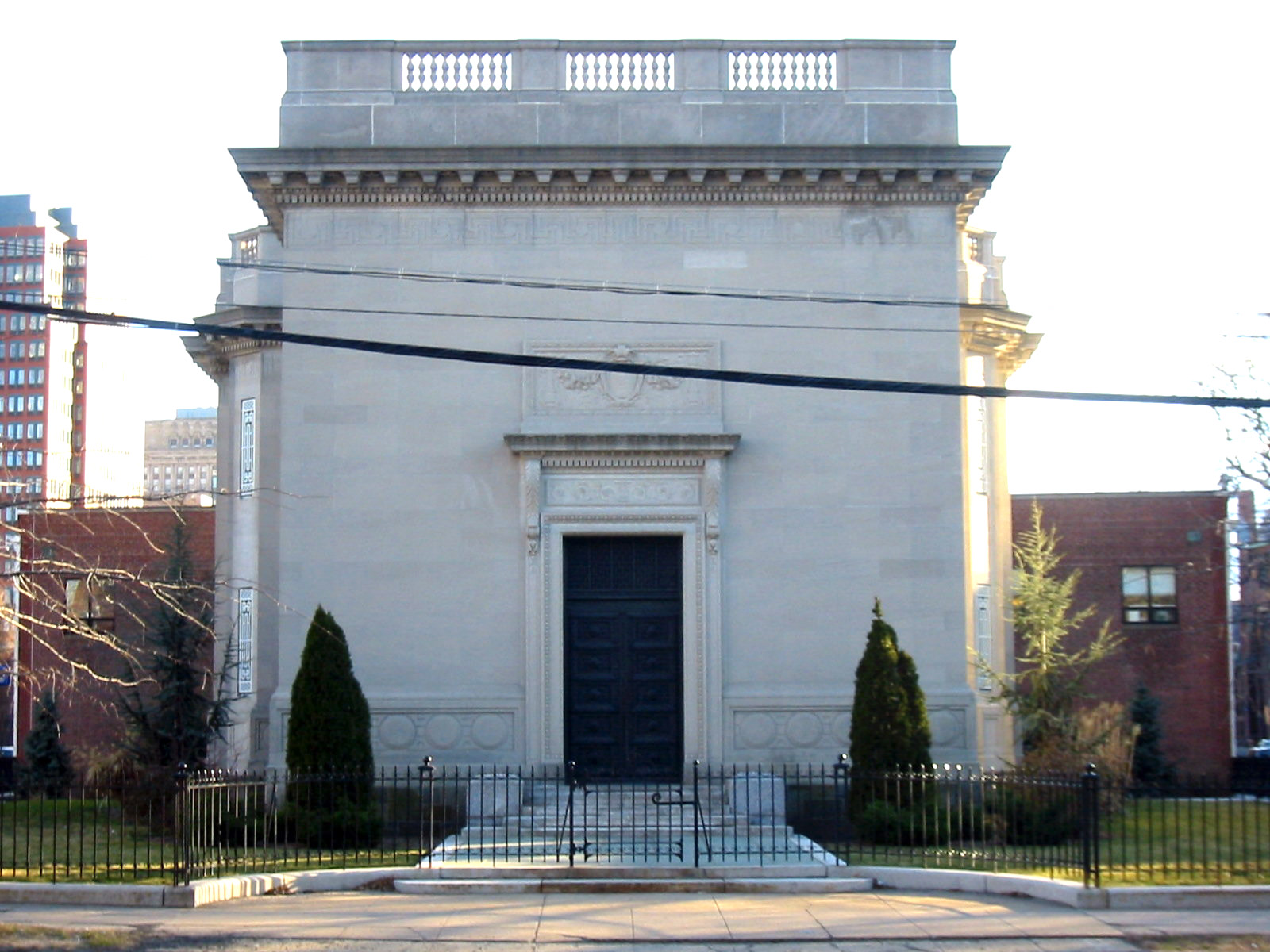
Berzelius tomb, from Temple Street

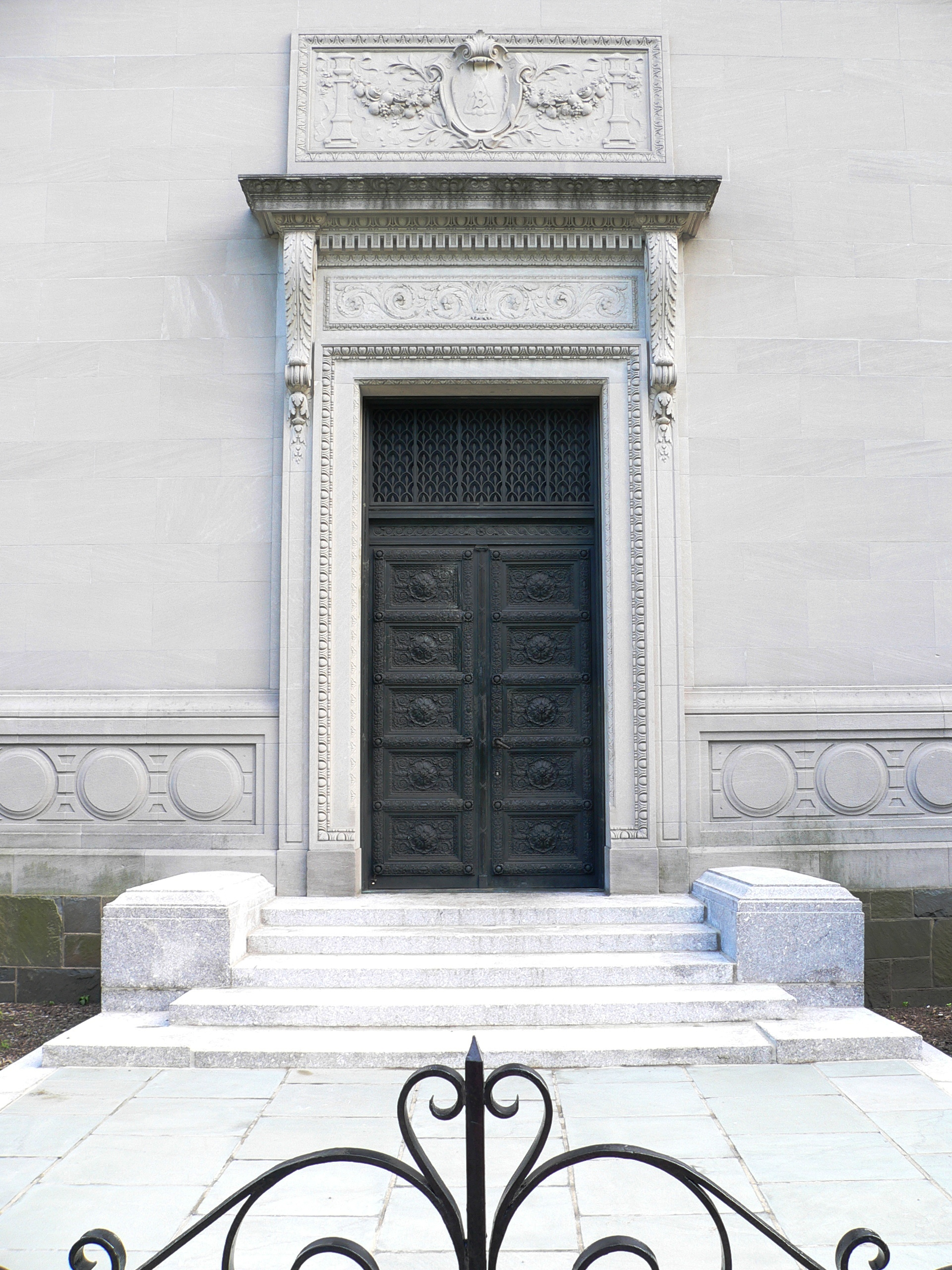
The tomb's classically symmetrical entrance

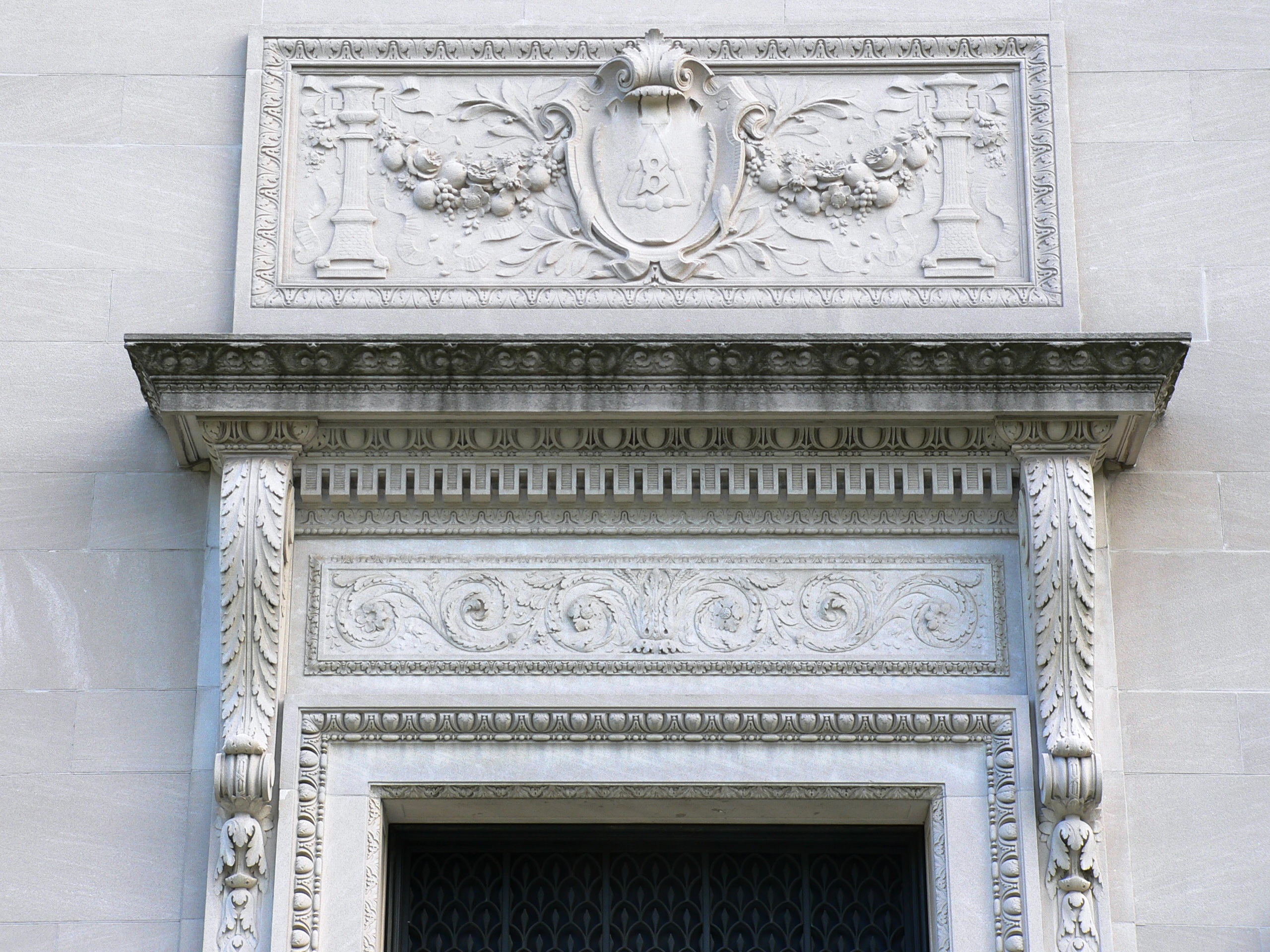
Detail of entryway ornamentation, including the Berzelius Society symbol within the shield

Berzelius Society (BZ) is the third oldest secret society for seniors at Yale University in New Haven, Connecticut, United States. Established in 1848, it is named after the Swedish scientist Jöns Jakob Berzelius, considered one of the founding fathers of modern chemistry. In addition, Berzelius is part of the "Ancient Eight" societies, which includes Mace and Chain, Book and Snake, Elihu Club, St. Elmo’s Society, Scroll and Key, Skull and Bones, and Wolf’s Head Society.

== History ==
Berzelius is a secret society established as the Colony Club in 1848 at Sheffield Scientific School, a former school of Yale University in New Haven, Connecticut. One of its founding members was William Henry Brewer. The club was housed on campus in Berzelius Hall, named after the Swedish scientist Jöns Jakob Berzelius, considered one of the founding fathers of modern chemistry. Eventually, the Colony Club started using the name Berzelius.

As the society is often called, BZ is the third oldest society at Yale and the oldest of those of the now-defunct Sheffield Scientific School. From 1854 to 1956, this institution was the sciences and engineering college of Yale University. Berzelius became a senior society in the tradition of Skull and Bones, Scroll and Key, and Wolf's Head in 1933 when the Sheffield Scientific School was integrated into Yale University.

The society takes its intellectual mission seriously, invoking Socrates' exhortation "The unexamined life is not worth living” and stating to its prospective members that: "Berzelius provides opportunities for achieving insights through an open, honest exchange of experiences, passions, and opinions. This process prepares its members — whose diversity is highly valued — for an active, intellectually vigorous, and moral life, giving them a place and time for contemplation and reflection so that they might rise boldly to the challenges of their lives, devoted to good character, tolerant of others, and willing to serve their communities while forging links of mind to mind in a chain unbroken."

The society's corporate name is Colony Foundation, changed from the Bezelius Trust Association in 1951.

== Buildings ==
The Colony Club initially had meeting rooms in Berzelius Hall on the Sheffield campus. In 1898, the society built a house called The Colony; it was the residence of the senior members of Berzelius. Architects Henry Bacon and James Brite designed the Colonial Revival and Neoclassical brick residence on Hillside Avenue. Yale purchased the BZ dormitory in 1933 for student housing, later using it for faculty offices. It was demolished in 1969 to make way for the Yale Health Services Center.

In 1910, the Berzelius Trust Association purchased property at 78 Trumbull Street in New Haven to construct a new building or tomb for BZ's meeting place. Berzelius member and architect Donn Barber designed the building to resemble a Greek temple. The limestone neoclassical tomb was completed in 1910. BZ's building is called a tomb, the customary appellation for a secret society structure at Yale. However, many BZ members refer to their building as The Hall. This is likely a transferred linguistic remnant of the tradition of Sheffield's secret societies, which had halls for residential use and tombs as separate meeting places, in contrast to the Yale College senior secret societies, which maintained only tombs.

The BZ tomb is set off from the more active center of Yale's campus, providing privacy for Berzelius' members, and its mainly unadorned blank exterior conveys to outsiders the deceptive sense that nothing much happens inside. In addition to the meeting room, dining area, and numerous study rooms, there are below-ground activity rooms with a pool table and a ping pong table for recreation. Its exterior is plain but does have a roof with a balustrade and detailed cornice, double brass doors with floral ornamentation, and a carved limestone detail showing the society's insignia above the entrance. In 2002, BZ's tomb underwent a major restoration.

== Notable members ==
Berzelius's members have included U.S. senators and governors, influential journalists and activists, accomplished athletes and artists, and successful businesspeople. Some of its notable members are listed below.

- Donn Barber, architect
- Clifford Whittingham Beers, founder of the American mental hygiene movement
- William Henry Brewer, botanist and the first chair of Agriculture at the Sheffield Scientific School
- David Dellinger, American pacifist and activist
- A. Peter Dewey, Office of Strategic Services operative
- Bill DeWitt III, president of the St. Louis Cardinals
- Bradford Dillman, actor
- John A. Hartwell, college football player and coach
- Tony Knowles, American politician and businessman who served as the seventh governor of Alaska
- Levi Jackson, the first African American to captain an Ivy League football team, was also the first African American member of a Yale secret society. Later, a high-ranking executive at Ford Motor Company
- Stanhope Wood Nixon, vice president and chairman of the board of the Nixon Nitration Works
- William Proxmire, United States Senator (D) from Wisconsin from 1957 to 1989. An early critic of the Vietnam War, and an outspoken campaigner against wasteful government spending
- William W. Scranton, Republican Governor of Pennsylvania from 1963 to 1967; United States Ambassador to the United Nations from 1976 to 1977
- Frank Shorter, the only American athlete to win two medals in the Olympic marathon.
- Gaddis Smith, a historian who was the Larned Professor Emeritus of History at Yale University
- James W. Symington, United States House of Representatives
- Frederick Vreeland, United States ambassador to Morocco

== See also ==
- Collegiate secret societies in North America
