= St. Elmo Society =

Secret society at Yale University, US

- Founded: 1889; 137 years ago Yale University
- Type: Senior society
- Affiliation: Independent
- Former affiliation: Delta Phi
- Status: Active
- Scope: Local
- Patron saint: Saint Elmo
- Chapters: 1
- Headquarters: 35 Lynwood Place; New Haven, Connecticut 06511; United States

St. Elmo Society, or Elmo's, is a secret society for seniors at Yale University. It was founded in 1889 as part of the national fraternity, Delta Phi. St. Elmo's is a member of the “ancient eight consortium” which includes the seven other original societies at Yale: Skull and Bones, Scroll and Key, Berzelius, Wolf's Head, Book and Snake, Elihu, and Mace and Chain.

== History ==
St. Elmo Society was founded in 1889 as the Omicron chapter of the national fraternity Delta Phi. St. Elmo was the third senior society at the Sheffield Scientific School, Yale's sciences and engineering college from 1854 to 1956. The Sheffield Societies were clubs that also provided residential quarters for the students.

In June 1905, the group was incorporated under Connecticut state law to form the St. Elmo Corporation, with the primary purpose of holding the title to a new clubhouse at 111 Grove Street and other financial assets. Thus, the society is considered a “landed" society, the name given to societies at Yale that own a house or tomb.

On October 11, 1925, the chapter severed its ties with Delta Phi and became an independent organization called the St. Elmo Society. The Harvard Crimson reported that the split came "after the mother chapter deplored its snobbishness and disrespect of frat pins." The creation of Yale's residential system in 1933 led some Sheffield organizations to sell their buildings to the university, but St. Elmo retained its residence.

In 1965, a decade after the Sheffield school was incorporated into Yale College, St. Elmo Society became a secret senior society in the style of Skull and Bones, Scroll and Key, and Wolf's Head. According to the Yale Daily News, the society is known for the Halloween party it holds at its house or tomb and other parties throughout the year.

== Chapter houses ==
Chapter houses

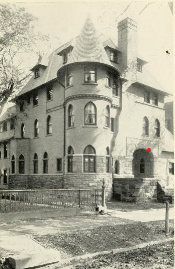
St. Elmo Hall, 111 Grove Street, 1895-1912

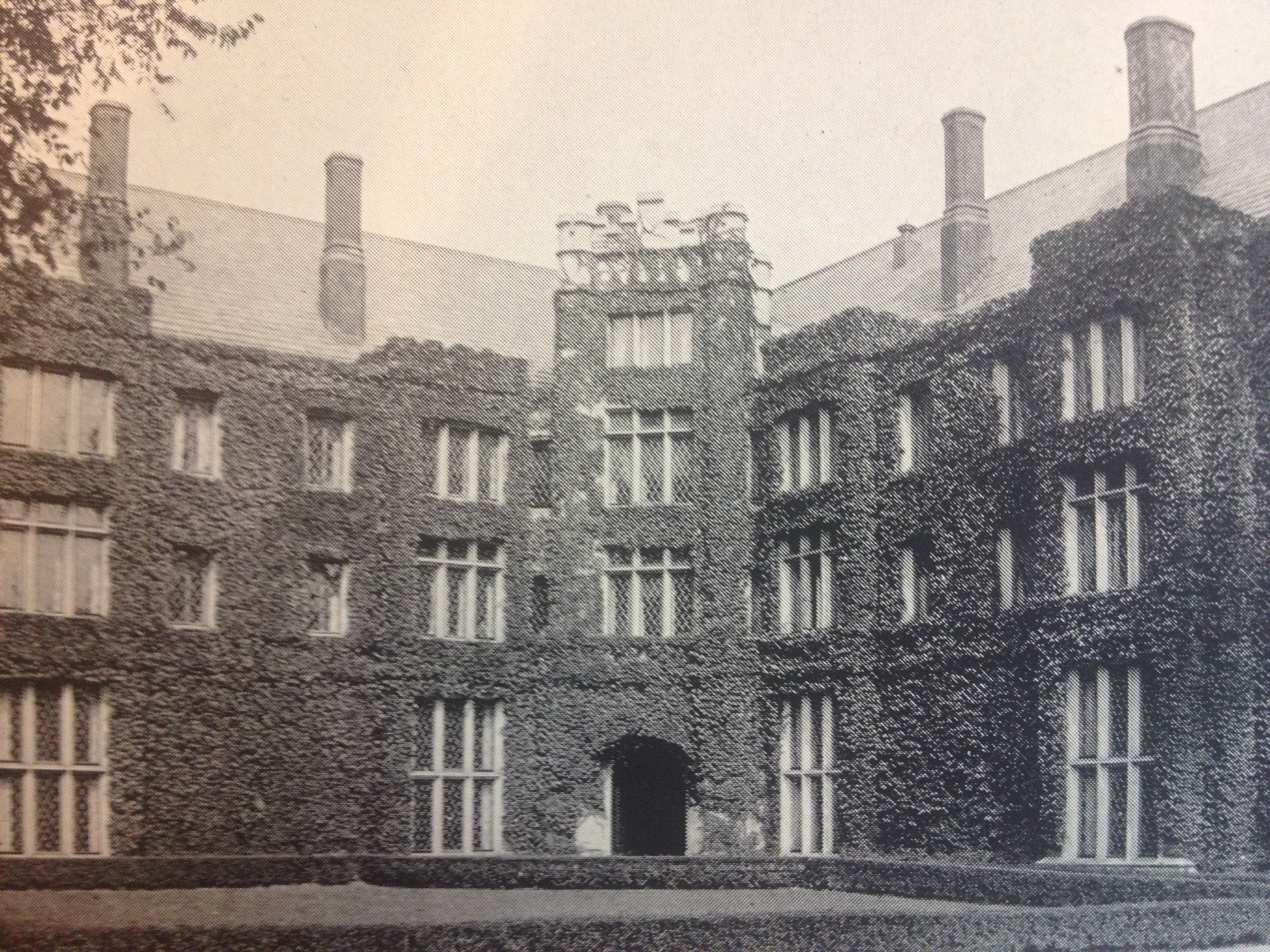
St. Elmo Hall (second) 1912-1985

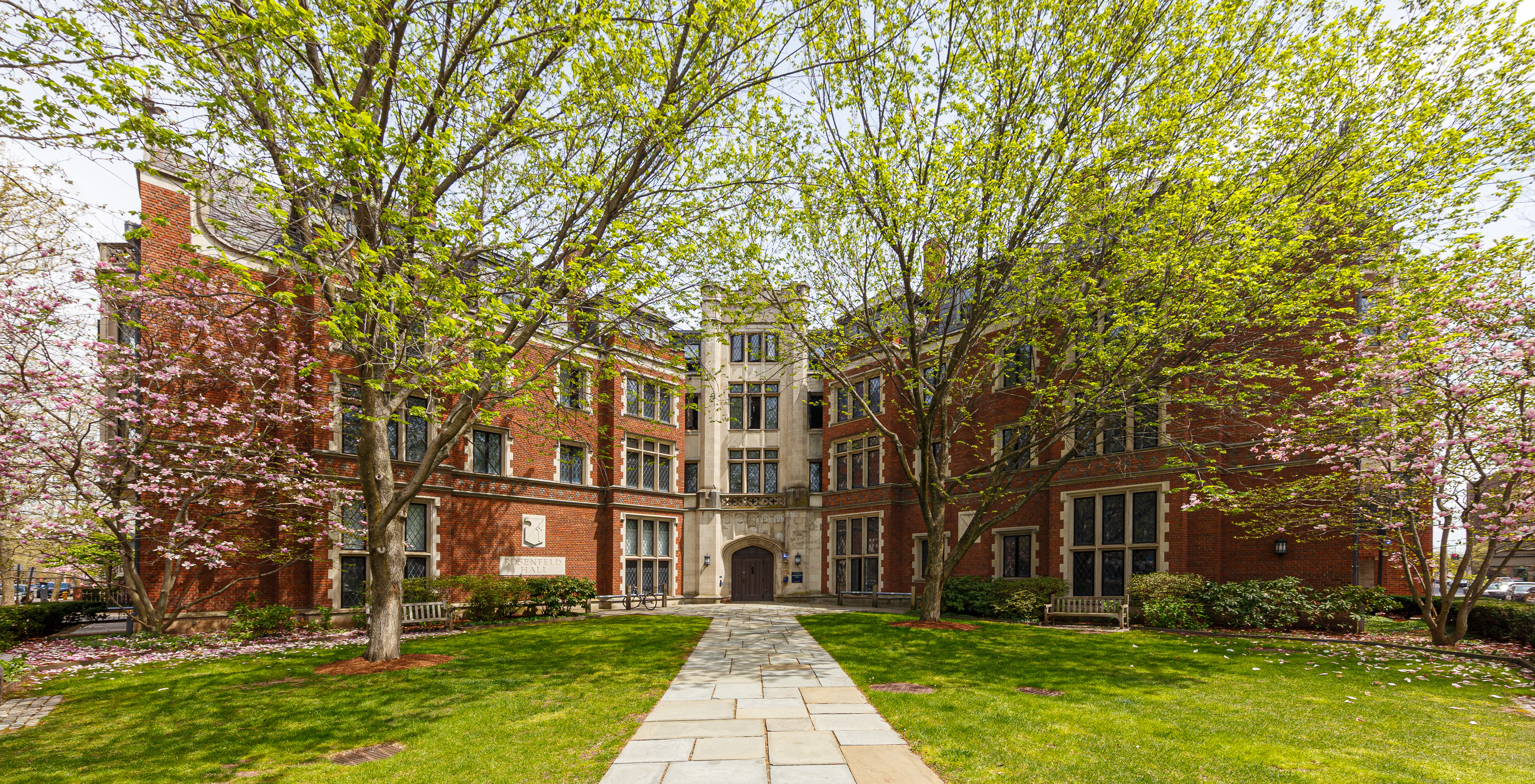
St. Elmo Hall was purchased by Yale and renamed Rosenfeld Hall in 1962

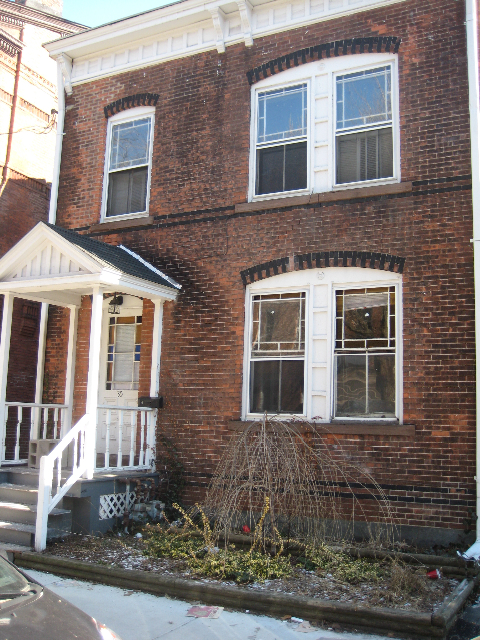
St. Elmo's current "tomb" (1986- )

Delta Phi's original chapter house or dormitory was built in 1895 at 111 Grove Street. It was called St. Elmo Hall or St. Elmo Clubhouse. The group selected this name from deference to it iconography from the Knights of Malta who were seafarers; Saint Elmo is the patron saint of sailors.

Construction on St. Elmo Hall started on April 1, 1895, and was completed in September. Its cost was $20,000 ($774000 in today's money). Its first floor consisted of East Haven stone (brown sandstone) and its upper floors were of buff-colored brick with trimming of terra cotta and East Haven stone. The roof was slate. Inside, St. Elmo Clubhouse included a library, a large oak-paneled hall or reception room, a smoking room, a billiard room, studies, two floors of bedrooms, and bathrooms. Its 25 by 17 feet (7.6 by 5.2 m) chapter room was on the fourth floor. The New York Times noted that St. Elmo Hall was "handsomely furnished".

In 1912, the society built a new dormitory next door at 109 Grove Street. Also called St. Elmo Hall, it was designed by architect Kenneth MacKenzie Murchison in an Elizabethan style. The three-story Elizabethan style building cost $130,000 ($4337069 in today's money).

During World War II, St. Elmo Hall became a convalescent hospital for soldiers who were out of the hospital but still need observation. Yale started leasing dormitory space in St. Elmo Hall starting in 1945 and bought the building in 1962. After purchasing the building, the university renamed it Rosenfeld Hall. The society leased part of Rosenfeld Hall from the university.

In 1985, the university refused to renew St. Elmo's lease at 109 Grove Street, giving the society short notice to move out and find a new residence. The following year, St. Elmo Society purchased a building at 35 Lynwood Place. As of 2021, Rosenfeld Hall is used for residential annex and classroom space. The society's former chapter room in the basement is used for furniture storage.

== Symbols ==
When it was part of Delta Phi, the fraternity's badge was the Maltese cross of the Knights of Malta. The Yale chapter selected Saint Elmo, also known as Erasmus of Formia, as the namesake of its house in 1895. Saint Elmo was chosen because he is the patron saint of sailors, and the Knights of Malta were seafarers. Copying the Omicron chapter, other chapters of Delta Phi began using the St. Elmo name; today, the fraternity is known as both Delta Phi and St. Elmo Hall. When it separated from Delta Phi in 1925, the Yale chapter changed its name from St. Elmo Hall to St. Elmo Society. By that time, the chapter demonstrated "disrespect" for the fraternity's badge.

== Membership ==
Delta Phi fraternity selected its male members in December of their freshmen year. Each pledge class was consisted of twelve members.

Today, St. Elmo Society is a senior society. It began admitting women sometime before 1982.

== Popular culture ==
The novel Ninth House (2019) by Leigh Bardugo features a fictionalized version of St. Elmo Society, whose members can conjure storms with sorcery.

== Notable members ==
- John Ashcroft (1964), 79th United States Attorney General
- Albie Booth, inductee into the College Football Hall of Fame
- Robert Morse Crunden (1962), professor at the University of Texas and director of American Studies Department
- Ron DeSantis (2001), 46th Governor of Florida
- Charles James Freeborn (1899), Croix de Guerre recipient for his service in World War I and captain in the United States Army
- James E. Fuchs (1950), Olympic medalist
- Calvin Hill (1969), All-Pro NFL running back; father of NBA All-Star, Grant Hill
- Guy Hutchinson (1906), president of Proctor & Schwartz Electric Company and All-American Football quarterback
- Barrington Daniels Parker Jr. (1965), a federal judge on the United States Court of Appeals for the Second Circuit
- Allison Williams (2010), actress, Jordan Peele's Get Out, HBO's Girls

== See also ==
- Secret Societies at Yale University
- Collegiate secret societies in North America
