= Wolf's Head Society =

Secret society based at Yale University, New Haven

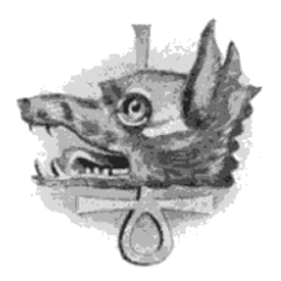
- Founded: 1883; 143 years ago Yale University
- Type: Senior society
- Affiliation: Independent
- Status: Active
- Scope: Local
- Member badge
- Symbol: Wolf head with inverted ankh
- Mascot: Wolf
- Chapters: 1
- Members: 16 per year active
- Nickname: Greyfriars, Fox and Grape, W.H.S.
- Former name: The Third Society
- Headquarters: 214 York Street; New Haven, Connecticut 06511; United States

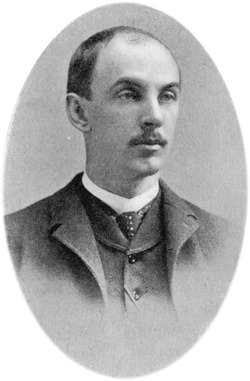
Franklin D. Bowen

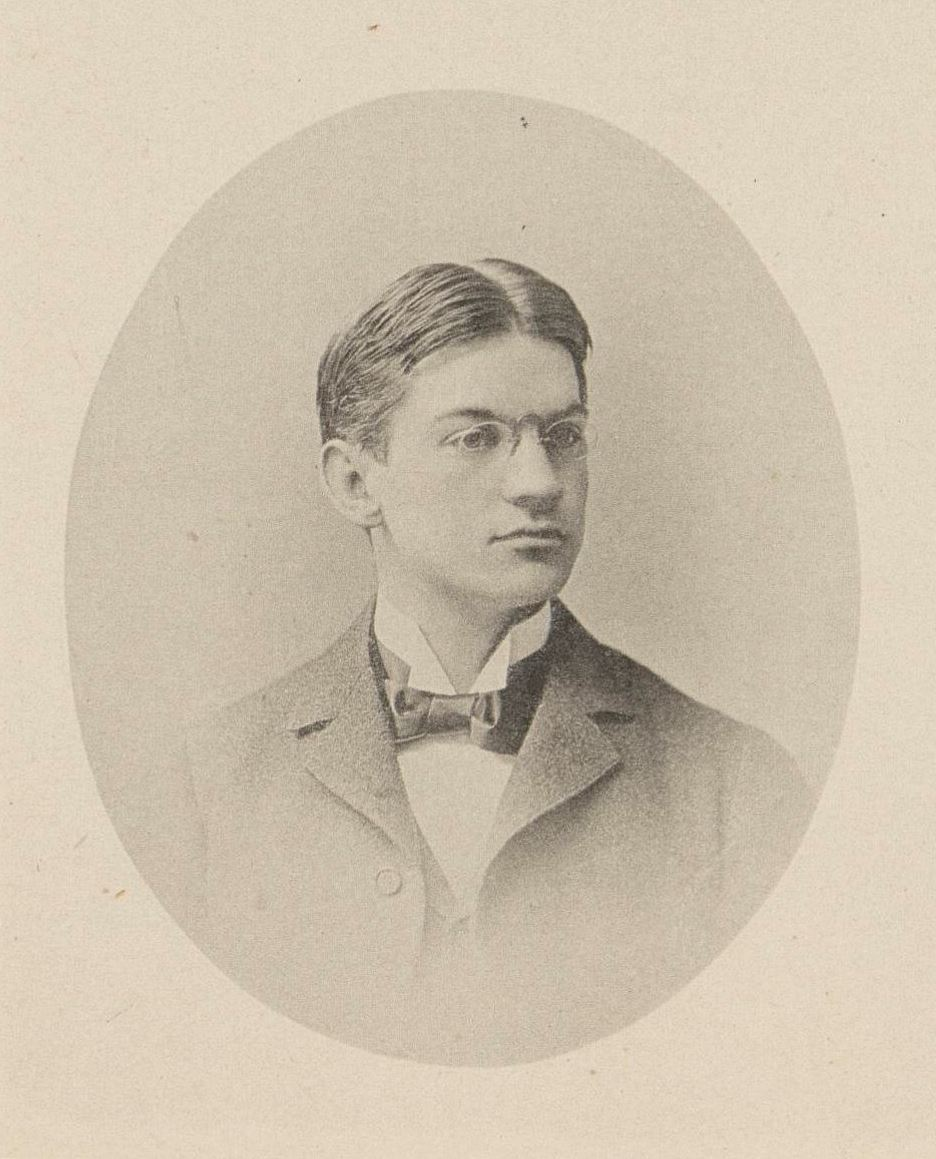
William L. Phelps

Wolf's Head Society is a senior secret society at Yale University in New Haven, Connecticut. It was established in 1883. The society is one of the "Big Three" and "Ancient Eight" societies at Yale. Active undergraduate membership is elected annually with sixteen Yale University students, typically rising seniors.

== History ==
Fifteen rising seniors from the Yale Class of 1884, with help from members of the Yale Class of 1883 who were considered publicly possible taps for the older societies, abetted the creation of The Third Society in 1883. Founding members included William Lyon Phelps, Charles W. Harkness, and Franklin Davis Bowen. The society changed its name to Wolf's Head five years later.

The effort was aided by more than 300 Yale College alumni and a few Yale Law School faculty, in part to counter the dominance of the Skull and Bones Society in undergraduate and university affairs.

The founding defeated the last attempt by the administration or the student body to abolish secret or senior societies at Yale. The tradition continued of creating and sustaining a society if enough potential rising seniors thought they had been overlooked: Bones was established in 1832 after a dispute over selections for Phi Beta Kappa awards; Scroll and Key Society, the second society at Yale, was established in 1841 after a dispute over elections to Bones.

The Third Society's founding was motivated in part by sentiment among some young men that they deserved insider status. "[A] certain limited number were firmly convinced that there had been an appalling miscarriage of justice in their individual omission from the category of the elect," some founders agreed.

== Antecedents ==
Before the founding in 1780 at Yale of the Connecticut Alpha chapter of Phi Beta Kappa, the second chapter established after that society's founding in 1776 (which still practices a secret handshake among members), Yale College students established and joined literary societies. By the 1830s, the campus literary societies Linonia, Brothers in Unity, and Calliopean had lost stature. Calliopean folded in 1853, and the others shut down after the American Civil War. Calliopean, Linonia, and Brothers in Unity existed respectively: 1819–1853, 1768–1878, and 1735–1868.

From the mid-1840s until 1883, several societies were started, but each failed to sustain the interest of liberal arts students at Yale College, broadly known as the Academical Department. Star and Dart, Sword and Crown, Tea-Kettle, Spade and Grave, and E.T.L. disbanded.

Phi Beta Kappa was inactive at Yale from 1871 to 1884, coinciding in part with a national reorganization of the society. In the 1820s, Anti-Masonic agitation sweeping across the United States prompted PBK to examine the role of secrecy in its proceedings. Associated with PBK's national reorganization in 1881, secrecy disappeared as a signature among all chapters, quelling rivalry with collegiate fraternities, clubs, and societies. Hence, secrecy was soon shelved at the Yale chapter. PBK exists today, without any secrecy, as an academic honor society.

Beginning in the 1850s, the Yale undergraduate student body grew more diverse. The college was becoming an institution of national rather than regional importance. Students who hailed from environs beyond New England or who were not Congregationalist or Presbyterian entered the college in large numbers.

The faculty and administration were dominated by alumni of Bones, numbering four out of five faculty members between 1865 and 1916. Bones alumni were university secretaries from 1869 to 1921. Bones alumni were university treasurers for forty-three of the forty-eight years between 1862 and 1910. Five of the first six Yale Corporation elected Alumni Fellows were members of Bones.

Dissatisfaction grew: In 1873, The Iconoclast, a student paper published once, October 13, 1873, advocated for the abolition of the society system. It opined:

"Out of every class Skull and Bones takes its men...They have obtained control of Yale. Its business is performed by them. Money paid to the college must pass into their hands, and be subject to their will....It is Yale College against Skull and Bones!! We ask all men, as a question of right, which should be allowed to live?"

The Yale Daily News first appeared on January 28, 1878. A memoir of the first college daily's birth records its first year strategy to "rag" the societies.

The Class of 1884 unanimously agreed to support a new revolt against the society system by issuing a vote of no confidence to coincide with their graduation. There was a widespread understanding that the existing society system was irredeemable and likely to be abolished.

A spirited defense of the society system appeared in the May 1884 issue of The New Englander, written and published by members of Scroll and Key. Several periodicals reported regularly on the situation.

== Establishment ==
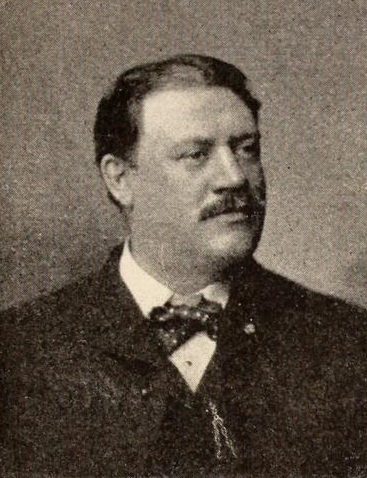
Edwin A. Merritt, Wolf's Head Class of 1884

The initial delegation, including ten Class Day officers from the Class of 1884 and led by Edwin Albert Merritt, met in secret during their senior year with the aid of members of the Class of 1883 who were "eager to start a society provided the evil features of the old societies would be eliminated. [The graduating and rising seniors] were unanimous on this point." Included among the supporters from the Class of 1883 were members touted as sure selections to Bones or Keys by the publishers of the Horoscope, an undergraduate publication that provided feature material on the most likely taps. The pro-society seniors won the Class Day vote, 67 - 50.

The new society was conceived on or about June 5, 1883. Among undergraduates, the fledgling group was known as the "Fox and Grapes" for the Aesopian fable of jealousy, The Fox and the Grapes.

The two older societies suffered by comparison with Wolf's Head. The New Haven Register reported in 1886:

"Wolf's Head is not as far out of the world, in respect to its public doings, as are [Bones and Keys]. There is a sufficient veil of secrecy drawn around its mechanism, however, to class it with the secret societies, and this gives it a stability and respectability in Yale College circles that it might not have otherwise...."

The society was managed similarly to finals clubs associated with the Sheffield Scientific School; however, it soon took on almost all aspects of the older societies. Today, Wolf's Head is a member of the "Big Three," which includes Scroll and Key and Skull and Bones, and the "Ancient Eight" societies which includes Book and Snake, Elihu, Berzelius, Mace and Chain, and St. Elmo’s.

== Early stature ==
The Third Society sat at the apex of a social pyramid bricked by junior societies (sophomore societies were abolished in 1875, freshman societies in 1880), campus organizations, athletic teams, clubs, and fraternities.

In 1888, the society changed its name to Wolf's Head Society, consonant with the approval among undergraduates of the society's pin, a stylized wolf's head on an inverted ankh, an Egyptian hieroglyphic known as the Egyptian Cross or "the key of life". The earliest undergraduate members allowed fellow schoolmates to handle the pin, a specific refutation of the pin displayed by the older societies. Eternal life is symbolized rather than death or erudition. A Roman fasces had been considered as a design element for the pin.

== Point of view ==
Many pioneering and subsequent members mocked as "poppycock" (from the Dutch for "soft excrement") the seemingly Masonic-inspired rituals and atmosphere associated with Skull and Bones. The sentiment was widespread in the Yale community, particularly among undergraduates. In their The Pirates of Penzance prank, Wolf's Head members persuaded the thespian pirate king to display the numbers 322 (part of the emblem of Skull and Bones) below a skull and crossbones at a local theatre. In another example, Yale President A. Whitney Griswold deprecated the rituals as "bonesy bullshit" and "Dink Stover crap" coloring undergraduate life.

Wolf's Head did maintain many traditional practices, such as the Thursday and Sunday meetings, which were common among its peers. Paul Moore, Jr., long-time Senior Fellow and successor trustee (1964 - 1990) for the Yale Corporation and long-tenured bishop in the Episcopal Church (United States), recalled the night before he first encountered combat in World War II:

"I spent the evening on board ship being quizzed by [a friend from Harvard] about what went on in Wolf's Head. He could not believe I would hold back such irrelevant secrets the night before I faced possible death."

- Wolf's Head Old Hall
- U.S. National Register of Historic Places
- U.S. Historic district – Contributing property
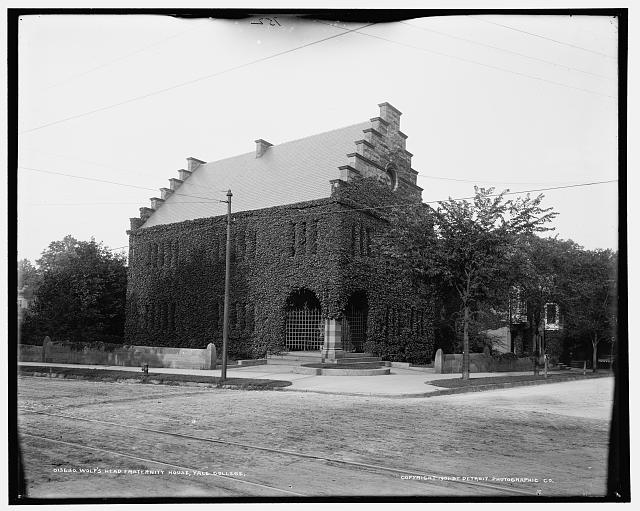
- Wolf's Head Tomb

- Location within Connecticut Location within the United States
- Location: 77 Prospect St. New Haven, Connecticut
- Coordinates: 41.3°N 72.9°W
- Built: 1856
- Architect: McKim, Mead and White, et al.
- Architectural style: Richardsonian Romanesque
- Part of: Hillhouse Avenue Historic District
- NRHP reference No.: 85002507
- Added to NRHP: September 13, 1985

== Symbols ==
The primary symbol of the Wolf's Head Society is its official badge, which depicts a wolf's head above an upside-down ankh in gold. Manufactured by Tiffany & Co., the 18k gold badge functions as the society's principal emblem and as a marker of membership.

== The Halls ==
=== Old Hall ===
The original tomb, or Old Hall, was erected within months of the founding. The older academic department societies met originally for decades in rented quarters near campus. Skull and Bones opened its tomb in 1856, more than two decades after its founding. Scroll and Key did likewise; it opened its tomb in 1869 more than two decades after the society's founding.

The former domicile, located at 77 Prospect Street, across the street from the Grove Street Cemetery, was a Richardsonian Romanesque building commissioned for the Phelps Trust Association and designed by the architectural firm McKim, Mead and White. It was completed in 1884. It was purchased by the university in 1924, rented to Chi Psi fraternity (1924–29), Book and Bond (defunct society) (1934–35), and Vernon Hall (now Myth and Sword) (1944–54). It currently houses the Yale Institution for Social and Policy Studies.

A building with narrow windows, the domicile was noted as "the most modern and handsomest" of same purpose structures by The New York Times in 1903. The building was erected in 1884 soon after the founding members secured financing.

=== New Hall ===
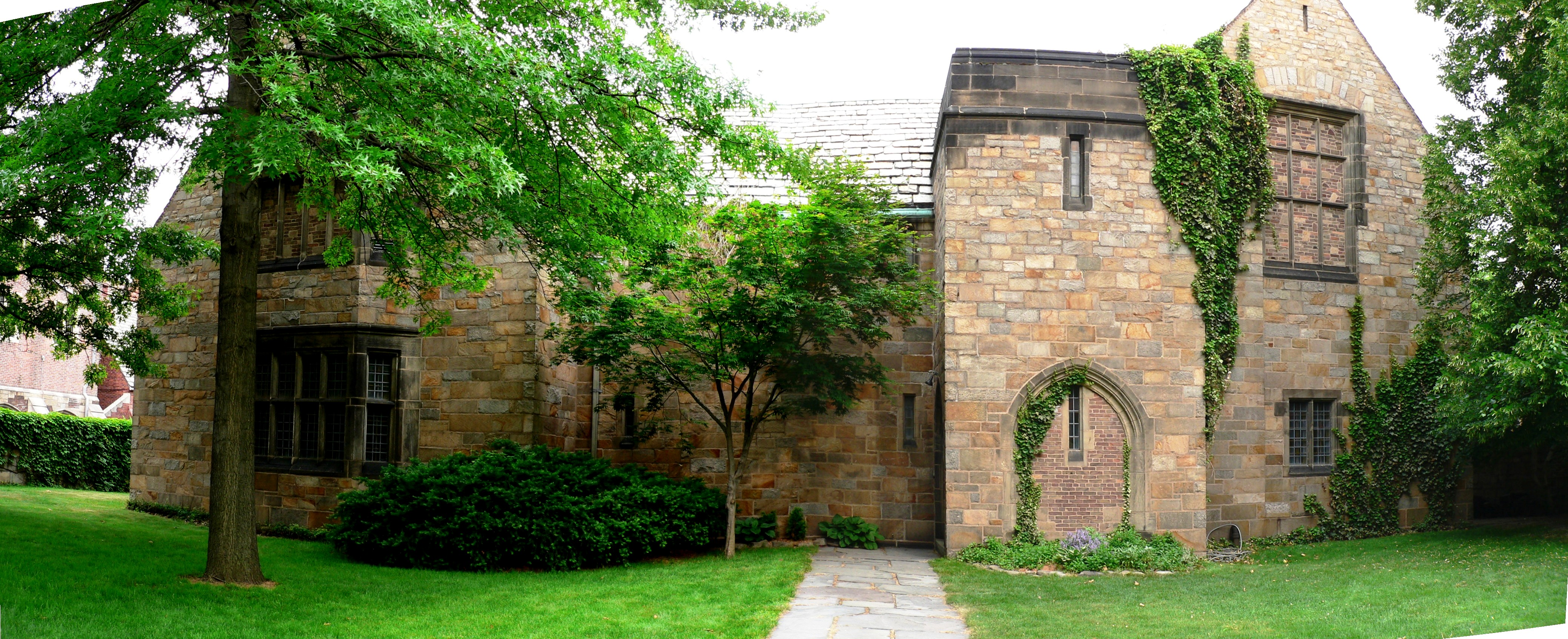
New Hall, designed by architect Bertram Grosvenor Goodhue, c. 1924

Bertram Goodhue, architect, designed the New Hall, c. 1924; it was built posthumously. Goodhue was a protege of James Renwick Jr., architect of the first St. Anthony Hall chapter house in New York City.

The tomb has stone walls and wrought iron fencing and is central to the largest secret society compound on campus. The compound commands the most prominent location on campus beyond Harkness Tower, the very icon of Yale, and the Memorial Quadrangle. The domicile opened in the mid-1920s and sits fronted by York Street, surrounded by the Yale Daily News Briton Hadden Memorial building, and the David Geffen School of Drama at Yale University. The original School of Drama and Theatre, as well as the Briton Hadden Memorial Building, were gifts to Yale from Edward Harkness.

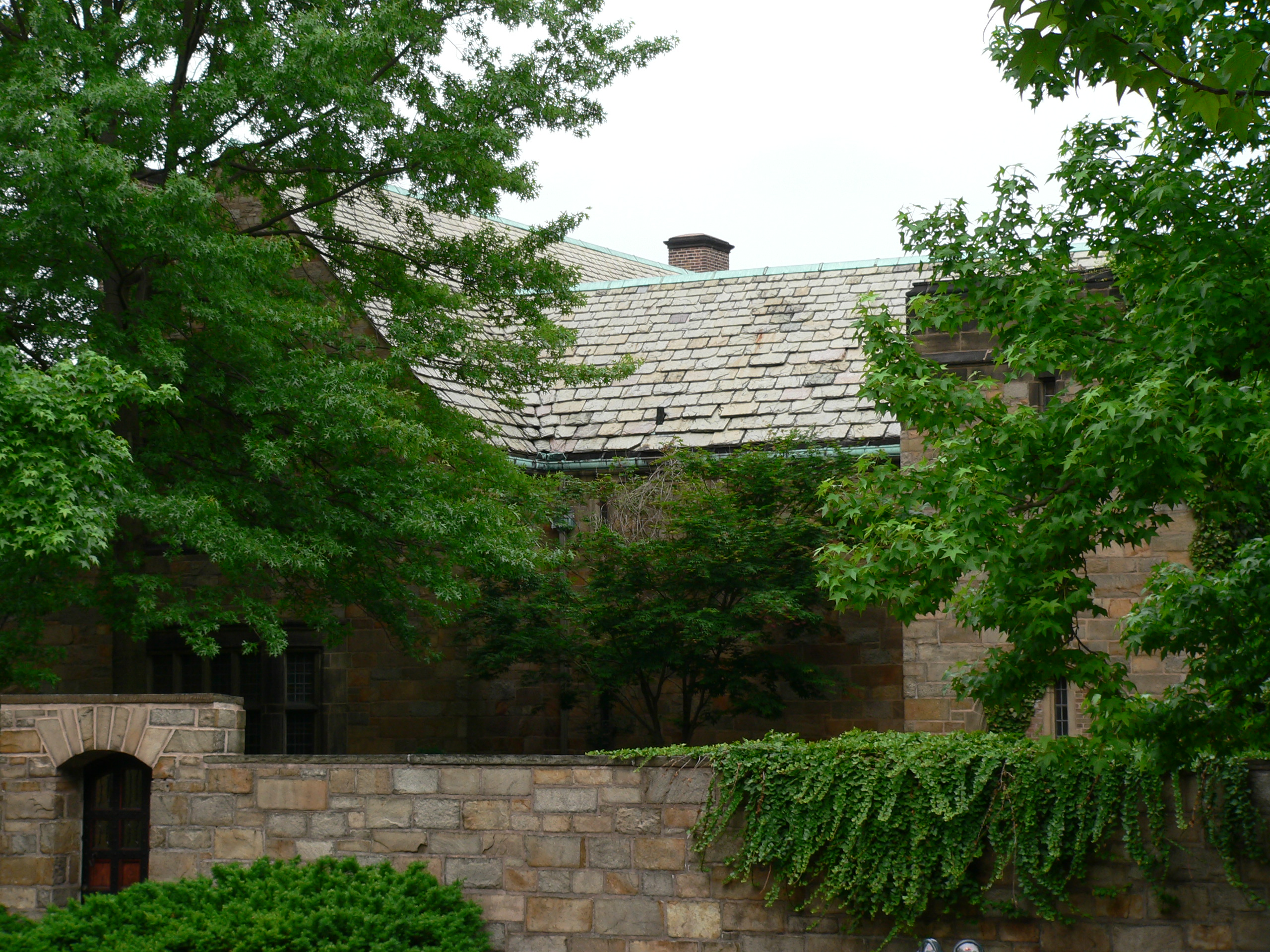
New Hall, shown behind its high stone enclosure.

==== Interior Design ====
In 1990, the New Hall was infiltrated, and it was reported that intruders saw stained flags around a round table, a clean lobby, stairs leading to a basement, a bulletin board of Egyptian gods, and a sculptural depiction of a female feline. A 2009 Yale Daily News guide to Yale senior societies described Wolf's Head's York Street tomb as containing a library, a large ballroom with stuffed animal heads, a cavernous basement games room, a meeting room known as the "Hall of the Twin Truths", and a wood-panelled dining room. The same account stated that the rumored swimming pool in the tomb is a myth.

== Phelps Trust Association ==
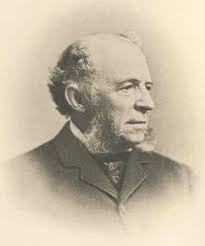
Edward John Phelps, namesake of the Phelps Association

The Phelps Trust Association, also referred to in more recent nonprofit filings as the Phelps Association, is the historical association connected with Wolf's Head. Yale University Library catalogs the society as "Wolf's Head Society (Phelps Trust Association)," and Yale sources on Wolf's Head's former hall at 77 Prospect Street identify the Phelps Trust Association as the client behind the building.

Federal tax filings describe the association's mission as supporting "the educational, social and professional development of its members through association activities". Those filings also show that it maintains endowment funds and land and buildings, indicating that it serves as the body that administers property and financial resources associated with Wolf's Head. Yale prize records further show that the association has sponsored or held in trust Yale awards including the C. Wyllys Betts Prize and the Henry H. Strong Prize in English. According to 2024 filing data published by ProPublica, the Phelps Association reported total assets of $9,501,303.

Edward John Phelps, Envoy to the Court of St. James's, accepted the offer in 1885 to be the namesake of the Wolf's Head alumni association.

== Membership ==
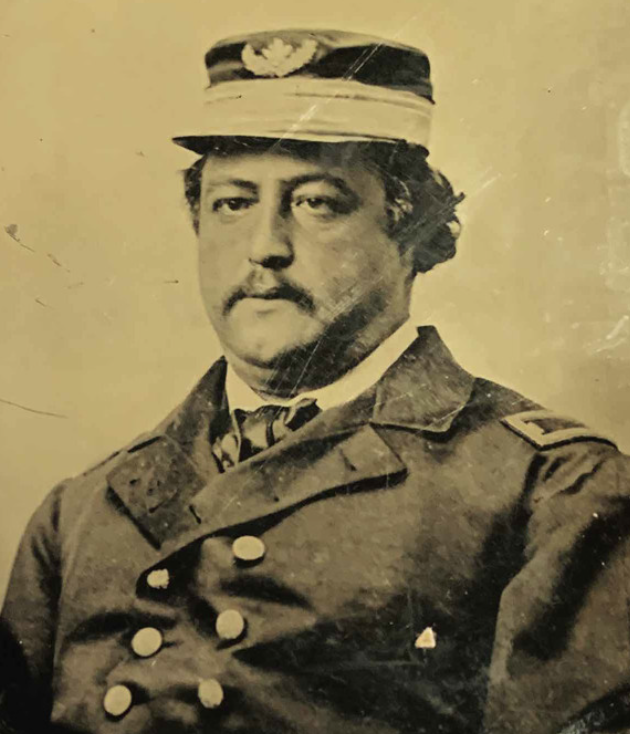
Richard Henry Greene, Wolf's Head Class of 1862

Wolf's Head Society selects new members during Yale's spring Tap Night, part of the university's annual senior-society tap process. According to Yale Alumni Magazine, a society council sets the dates for Tap Night and for when prospective members can first be contacted. A week before Tap Night, societies may begin offering membership to candidates, who do not have to commit until Tap Night itself. As one of Yale's older "landed" senior societies, Wolf's Head follows the general pattern described for those societies, which typically consist of 16 rising seniors chosen each spring.

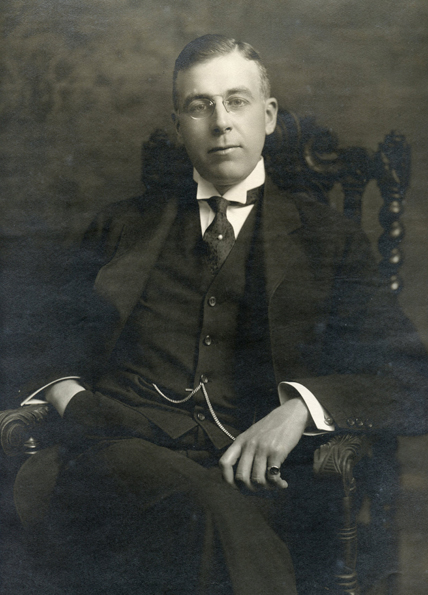
Edward Harkness, Wolf's Head Class of 1896

The society's internal selection process remains limited, and specific membership criteria are not publicly detailed. The society has been reputed to tap the gregarious "prep school type." Past members' achievements during their time at Yale have included being the first African American graduate (Richard Henry Greene), founding of the Elizabethan Club (Alexander Smith Cochran), founding of the Yale Political Union (A. Whitney Griswold), founding of the Yale Daily News (Herbert Wolcott Bowen), founding of The Pundits (William Lyon Phelps), creation of Yale's alma mater "Bright College Years" (Henry Strong Durand), the establishment co-education of Yale College (Sam Chauncey), and the establishment of the Yale residential college system and the Harvard house system (Edward Harkness).

Yale societies contrast sharply with Harvard finals clubs on membership criteria. Contributions to undergraduate life have been historically among the criteria for membership in Yale societies. Finals clubs overlook that quality among prospective members.

Wolf's Head was the last of Yale's all-male senior societies to admit women. In December 1991, more than 80 percent of the society's alumni voted to approve coeducational membership, ending what contemporaneous press coverage described as 108 years of all-male tradition. The decision followed Skull and Bones's vote earlier that year to admit women, and later accounts describe Wolf's Head as having begun tapping women in 1992.

== Traditions and activities ==
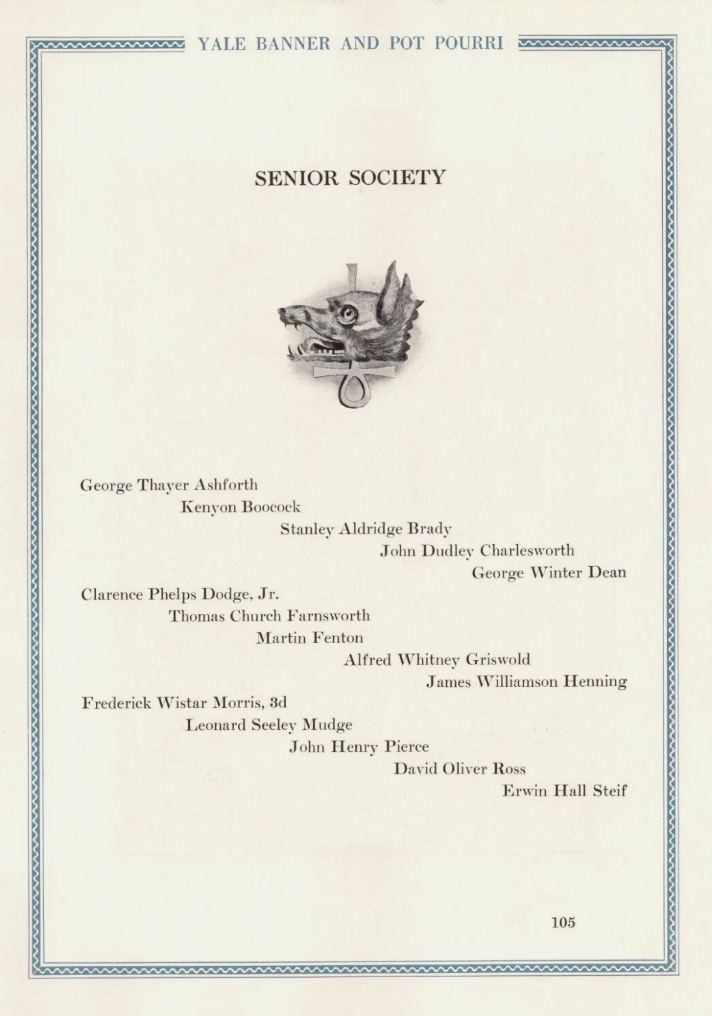
Yearbook listing of Wolf's Head members for 1929, including Alfred Whitney Griswold, President of Yale University (1951–1963).

Publicly documented Wolf's Head traditions center on Yale's annual Tap Night and the society's weekly meetings during members' senior year. Yale Alumni Magazine has described the older "landed" senior societies, including Wolf's Head, as maintaining long-standing traditions that are preserved with the help of alumni, and reported that societies of this type generally meet on Thursday and Sunday evenings for member biographies, discussion, dinner, and social activities. Sources note that senior societies continue to participate in Tap Week's public displays each spring. In a 2009 account of Tap Night, the Yale Daily News reported that Wolf's Head members "howled periodically throughout the night." Others reported snow wrestling matches in the yard during winter, and traditions that included referring to fellow members as names of Egyptian Gods within the tomb.

The society's private activities are conducted from its hall at 214 York Street, which Yale's New Haven Building Archive lists as a student society hall built in 1924. Archival records also document alumni-oriented traditions associated with the society, including a photograph identified as "Wolf's Head Alumni Dinner" in Yale's Guide to the Yale Clubs and Societies Photographs. Jerome Karabel’s The Chosen says Alfred Griswold, President of Yale University (1951–1963), was elected to Wolf’s Head as an undergraduate and later remained a loyal member as a young faculty member, in the context of Yale old-boy social life. Because Wolf's Head operates privately, many of its internal rituals and customs are not publicly described in detail.

== Notable members ==
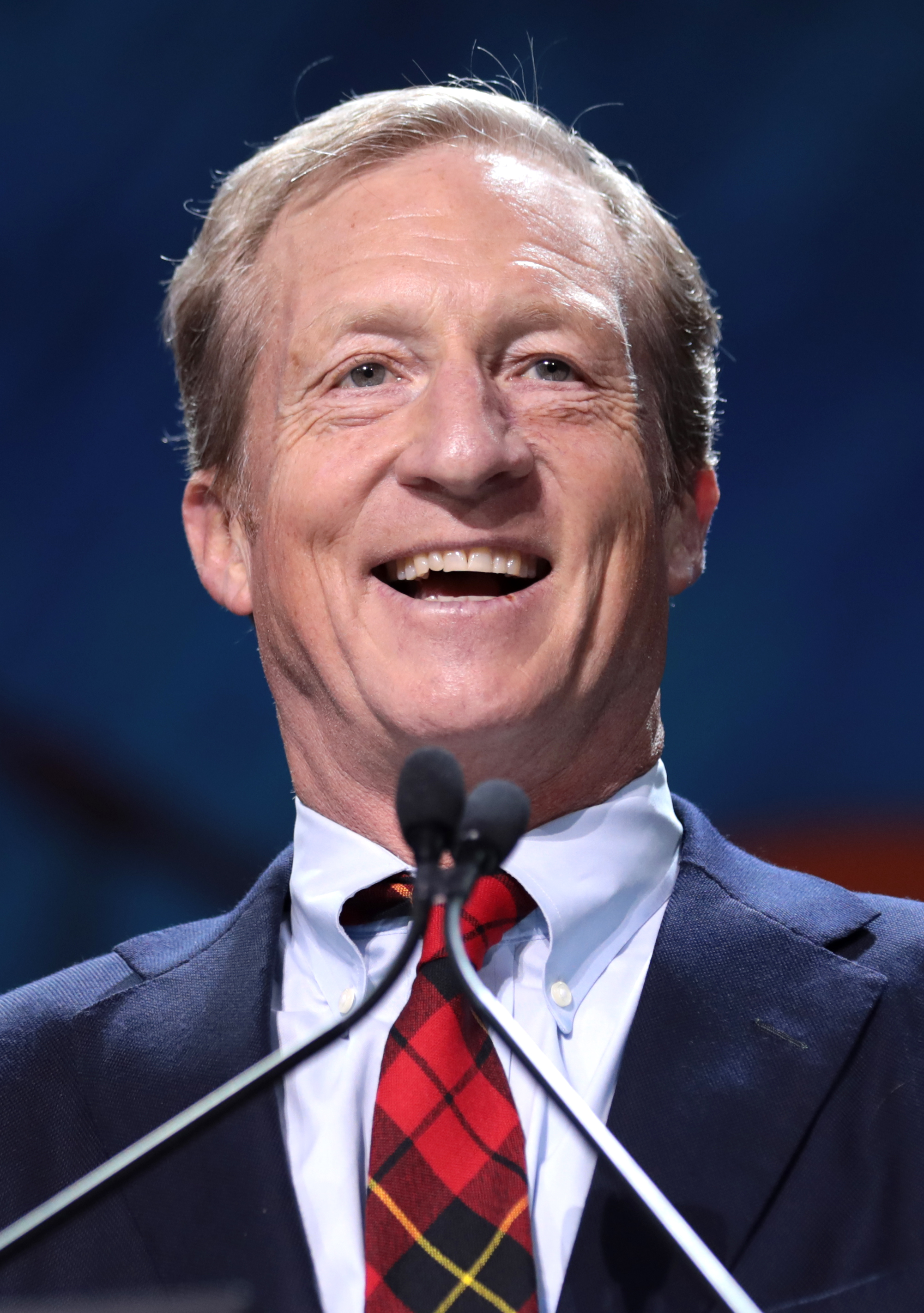
Tom Steyer, Wolf's Head Class of 1979

The activities of Wolf's Head members during their undergraduate Yale years have included leadership in athletics, student politics, journalism, and civil-rights activism. In a study of Yale's first women during the late 1960s and early 1970s, some of Yale's most visible Black student leaders combined civil rights activism with membership in Wolf's Head; in the same passage, she noted that Black Student Alliance at Yale leader played varsity basketball and Kurt Schmoke played football. Later examples of Wolf's Head members associated with Yale athletics include billionaire and political activist Tom Steyer, who the Yale Daily News described as having walked on to the Yale soccer team and become team captain.

Other former member includes Scott Bessent, who served as president of Wolf's Head, treasurer of the class of 1984, chairman of the 1984 Alumni Fund, and interned under Jim Rogers. He would later become the 79th United States secretary of the treasury. Charles Ives, later regarded as one of the major American modernist composers, during his Yale years studied with composer Horatio Parker, composed his First Symphony, and experimental pieces including Yale-Princeton Football Game, inspired by Yale football, and was later elected into Wolf's Head Class of 1898. Wolf's Head alumni also includes two Yale University presidents: Alfred Griswold and Benno Schmidt Jr. and Justice of the Supreme Court (1890-1910) David Brewer.

During Leigh Bardugo's time at Yale, she was a member of Wolf's Head, and fictionalized the Wolf's Head society in Ninth House as a group of shapeshifters.

== Criticism and exclusivity ==
Public criticism of Wolf's Head has generally treated the society as part of Yale's broader system of landed senior societies, whose secrecy, buildings, alumni support, and tap process have been criticized as markers of social privilege. Yale Alumni Magazine identifies Wolf's Head among Yale's older "landed" senior societies, a group with prominent buildings and long-standing traditions preserved with alumni involvement.

Student commentary has focused both on the society's physical presence and its social inaccessibility. A 2013 Yale Daily News piece titled "Dear Wolf's Head" addressed the society's York Street hall as a silent neighbor whose windows faced a student's bedroom, presenting the tomb as a visible but closed-off presence in campus life. In a 2023 personal essay for the Yale Daily News, Isabella Zou described the appeal of landed societies through the logic of exclusion, using the title "I belong because you don't" to criticize the social meaning attached to selection.

Other commentary has linked the exclusivity of landed societies to their material resources. In the Yale Daily News, a column titled "The keys to the castle" criticized the benefits available to students tapped by many landed societies, including private dinners, alumni networks, and access to society owned spaces, while noting the substantial assets of Wolf's Head and Scroll and Key. A 2016 Yale Daily News article on society finances similarly reported that Wolf's Head had assets of almost $7 million, placing it below Scroll and Key among the wealthiest societies. Business Insider likewise ranked Wolf's Head among Yale's wealthiest secret societies and described it as having a reputation for tapping the " prep school " type primarily.

== Popular culture ==
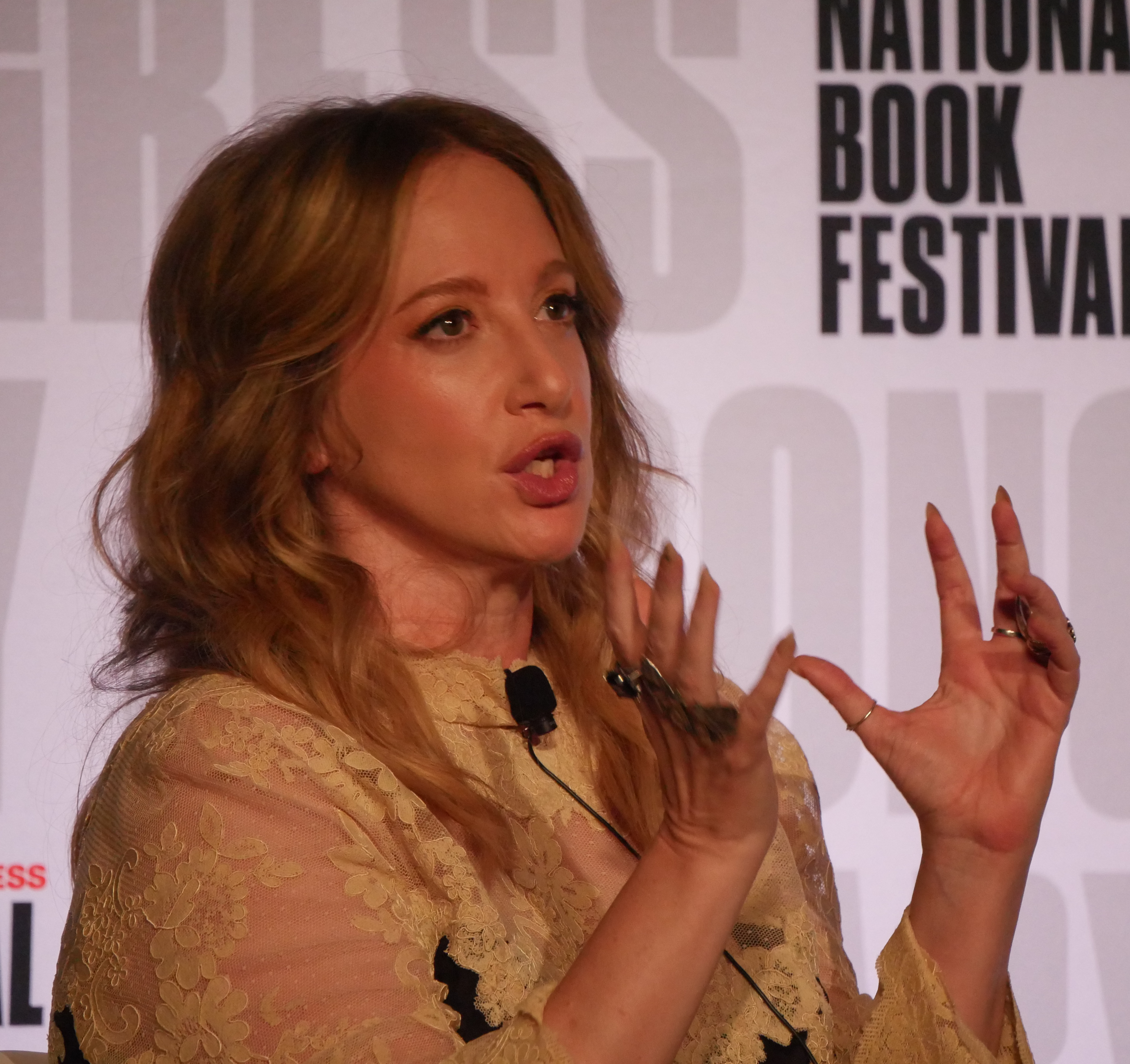
Leigh Bardugo, Wolf's Head Class of 1997

=== Modern fictional depictions ===
- In Leigh Bardugo's 2019 fantasy novel and Goodreads Choice Award winner Ninth House, Wolf's Head is fictionalized as one of Yale's magical "Houses of the Veil". The novel associates the society with therianthropy, intelligence gathering, corporate espionage, and political sabotage, and describes incidents including historical recruitment for the CIA and a 1982 re-animation of a dinosaur statue.
  - In the sequel to Ninth House, Hell Bent, Bardugo continues using Wolf’s Head in its fictional Yale society system, describing Wolf’s Head rituals such as the “wolf run” and transformations.
- In E. K. Prescott's mystery novel The Ivy League Chronicles: The Sins of Man, a suspicious death involves one of a character's Wolf's Head society brothers at Yale.

=== Early Yale campus fiction ===
- In Owen Johnson's 1911 Yale campus novel Stover at Yale, the society is mentioned by name during a Tap Day scene. The novel's depiction of Yale society culture was later described by Time as having captivated "generations of schoolboys".
- In Mary Raymond Shipman Andrews's 1911 story The Courage of the Commonplace, Wolf's Head is identified with Skull and Bones and Scroll and Key as one of the three Yale senior societies choosing members on Tap Day. The story was later adapted as the 1917 silent film The Courage of the Common Place, whose first reel depicted an episode in the protagonist's Yale college career and was filmed on location at Yale.
- In Walter Camp's 1909 novel Jack Hall at Yale: A Football Story, Wolf's Head appears in the book's depiction of Yale football, Tap Day, and senior-society culture.
- In Noah Vail's 1913 parody Stover in Bones, Wolf's Head is mentioned alongside Scroll and Key and Skull and Bones in a spoof of Yale senior society fiction.

=== Memoirs and personal accounts ===
- In his memoir Presences: A Bishop's Life in the City, Episcopal bishop and Wolf's Head member Paul Moore Jr. recalled that, on the night before he first faced combat in World War II, a Harvard friend questioned him about what occurred inside Wolf's Head, but Moore still refused to reveal the society's secrets.
- Geoffrey Kabaservice's The Guardians: Kingman Brewster, His Circle, and the Rise of the Liberal Establishment includes an anecdote involving A. Whitney Griswold, Kingman Brewster, and Wolf's Head. Kabaservice recounts that Brewster attempted to tell Griswold that he had rejected Skull and Bones, but Griswold was away attending Wolf's Head Tap Night ceremonies.
- Alexandra Robbins's Secrets of the Tomb describes the circumstances of the society's founding, its early use of the names "Grey Friars" and "The Third Senior Society", the origin of the Wolf's Head name from the society's pin, and the society's acceptance on campus in comparison with other upstart Yale societies. The book also discusses a 1942 gift from Wolf's Head to Scroll and Key and also recounts an episode in which Wolf's Head members disrupted a performance of The Pirates of Penzance.

== Myths ==
Because Wolf's Head conducts its activities privately and restricts visitors, myths such as a pool being located within the tomb have emerged. Other myths have included possessing Hitler's silverware and a mummy behind glass. A Yale Daily News article referred to campus lore that a “real” wolf’s head sometimes appeared by the grave of Wolf’s Head founder William Lyon Phelps on Tap Night.

== See also ==
- Collegiate secret societies in North America
- List of senior societies

== Bibliography ==
- Andrews, John Williams. History of the founding of Wolf's Head. Lancaster: Lancaster Press, 1934. via Open Library.
- Kabaservice, Geoffrey. The Guardians: Kingman Brewster, His Circle, and the Rise of the Liberal Establishment. New York: Henry Holt and Company, 2004. ISBN 0-8050-6762-0
- Oren, Dan. Joining the Club: A History of Jews and Yale, Second Edition. Yale University Press, New Haven and London, 2000. ISBN 0-300-08468-4.
- Richards, David Alan. Skulls and Keys. Pegasus Books Ltd., 2017. ISBN 978-1-68177-517-3
- Robbins, Alexandra. Secrets of the Tomb: Skull and Bones, the Ivy League, and the Hidden Paths of Power. Boston: Little, Brown, 2002. ISBN 0-3167-3561-2
