= Gaddis Smith =

American historian (1932–2022)

- Born: George Gaddis Smith; December 9, 1932; Newark, New Jersey, U.S.
- Died: December 2, 2022 (aged 89); New Haven, Connecticut, U.S.
- Education: Pingry School; Yale College; Yale University (PhD)
- Occupation: Historian

George Gaddis Smith (December 9, 1932 – December 2, 2022) was an American historian who was the Larned Professor Emeritus of History at Yale University and an expert on U.S. foreign relations and maritime history.

== Biography ==
Born in Newark, New Jersey, Gaddis was raised in Summit, New Jersey. He graduated from the Pingry School in 1950.

Smith spent virtually his entire career at Yale. He received his bachelor's degree from Yale College in 1954 where he joined the Berzelius senior society; he served as chairman of the Yale Daily News. In 1961, he earned his PhD in history from Yale, and joined their faculty. In over 40 years of teaching at the university, he chaired the Department of History, served as master of Pierson College and directed the Yale Center for International and Area Studies. He retired from his appointment in 2000.

Smith spent more than 23 years writing a history of the university. Yale in the 20th Century was to be published in August 2007, but it has yet to be released. He continued to teach the occasional seminar at Yale.

Smith received several awards from Yale College for his work there:

- 1986 - The William Clyde DeVane Medal for distinguished scholarship and teaching, awarded by the Yale Chapter (Alpha of Connecticut) of Phi Beta Kappa
- 1989 - The Harwood F. Byrnes-Richard B. Sewall Prize for Teaching Excellence
- 1997 - The Mory's Cup for service to the university

One of his former students was former president George W. Bush. Smith was a member of the Connecticut Academy of Arts and Sciences and had been a member of the Acorn Club.

Smith died at his home in New Haven, Connecticut, on December 2, 2022, at the age of 89.

== Publications ==
Smith authored over 200 articles, book reviews and essays in The New York Times, the Los Angeles Times, Foreign Affairs, and various historical journals. He also published six books:

- Britain's Clandestine Submarines: 1914–1915 (1964)
- American Diplomacy in the Second World War (1966)
- The Aims of American Foreign Policy (1969)
- Dean Acheson (1972)
- Morality, Reason and Power: American Diplomacy in the Carter Years (1990)
- The Last Years of the Monroe Doctrine: 1945-1993 (1995)
