= Jacques Leslie =

Author and journalist

Jacques Leslie is an author and journalist. He was a war correspondent for the Los Angeles Times during the Vietnam War.

== Education ==
The son of Jacques Robert Leslie and Aleen Leslie, Jacques Leslie obtained his B.A. in American Studies from Yale University and graduated with departmental honors. He was a Yale-China fellow from 1968–70 and was a tutor in English at Chinese University of Hong Kong. He has a sister, Diane Leslie.

== Personal life ==
He married Leslie Wernick Leslie on June 21, 1980. Leslie had two children from a previous marriage, Tristan and Kadie and the couple had a daughter, Sarah.

== Awards and honors ==
Leslie has won a number of awards for his work which include:

- Winner, 2006 Drunken Boat Panliterary Award in Nonfiction for "Lisa's Shoe."
- Finalist, 2006 Northern California Book Award in Nonfiction for Deep Water.
- Deep Water named one of the top science books of 2005 by Discover Magazine.
- Winner, 2002 J. Anthony Lukas Work-in-Progress Award for Deep Water.
- Finalist, 2001 John B. Oakes Award in Distinguished Environmental Journalism, for "Running Dry: What Happens When the World No Longer Has Enough Freshwater?" published in Harper's Magazine, July 2000.
- Recipient, Marin (California) Arts Council grant for Creative Nonfiction, 2003 and 1999.
- The Mark named "one of the top censored books of 1995" by the 1996 Project Censored Yearbook.
- Pulitzer Prize nomination, Los Angeles Times, for foreign correspondence (India), 1975.
- Winner, Sigma Delta Chi Distinguished Service Award for best newspaper foreign correspondence, 1973.
- Winner, Overseas Press Club citation, 1973, "for incisive, consistently well-researched coverage of Vietnam and the Vietcong."
- Pulitzer Prize Nomination, Los Angeles Times, for foreign correspondence (Vietnam), 1973.

== Books ==
- Deep Water: The Epic Struggle Over Dams, Displaced People, and the Environment, Farrar, Straus & Giroux, August 2005.
- The Mark: A War Correspondent's Memoir of Vietnam and Cambodia, published by Four Walls Eight Windows in Spring, 1995.

== Magazines ==
Leslie's work has been published in such magazines as The Atlantic Monthly, The New York Times Magazine, Mother Jones, Orion, Wired, OnEarth, Newsweek, Washington Monthly, Columbia Journalism Review, Reader's Digest, among others.
