= Levi Jackson =

American football player (1926–2000)

Levi Jackson (August 22, 1926 – December 7, 2000) was an American college football player and business executive. He was the first African-American football captain at Yale, and the first African-American executive at Ford Motor Company.

== Biography ==
Jackson was born in Branford, Connecticut. Jackson's father was a master steward and chef at Pierson College at Yale. Like Albie Booth before him, Jackson was a football standout at Hillhouse High School in New Haven, Connecticut, and later at Yale.

Jackson attended Yale on the G.I. Bill, having attained the rank of sergeant in the U.S. Army Ordnance Corps. After playing football for the U.S. Army on the Camp Lee team in Virginia, Jackson turned down an offer to play for the New York Giants. That would have made him the first African-American to play in the modern National Football League (NFL).

Yale coach Howie Odell welcomed Jackson as a college football player, the 1946 Bulldogs achieving a 7–1–1 record, an Associated Press poll finish at 12, and a victory over Harvard, one of three during Jackson's four seasons with Yale. Jackson was a member of the Class of 1950 at Yale, and captained the 1949 Bulldogs, the election taken soon after the 1948 season. Jackson's election to the captaincy was unprecedented, given he was the first African-American to play football for Yale, but no surprise within the Yale community. "The voting took only ten minutes. There was no one else. It had to be Levi," a Yale player recounted.

Jackson also lettered for the Yale men's basketball team. He is understood to be the first African-American tapped for a Yale secret society or senior society. He was a member of the Berzelius Society, the Aurelian Honor Society, and the Alpha Phi Alpha fraternity.

After graduating from Yale, Jackson went to work for the Ford Motor Company in 1950. By 1962, he was an executive, the first African-American to reach that level at Ford; he was a vice president when he retired in 1983. Alongside his responsibilities while holding positions in labor relations, he was instrumental in setting up Ford's Minority Dealer Training Program, and helped see that Ford hired 10,000 workers from within the city of Detroit, where he chose to live. He was involved in his community, working with the New Detroit Committee after the 1967 Detroit riot, and served on the National Selective Service Appeal Board in 1969, at the height of the Vietnam War. Jackson was a longtime member of the Detroit YMCA Businessmen's Club, where he spent many hours holding court at the "main table."
