= Sozita Goudouna =

Greek curator, professor, and author

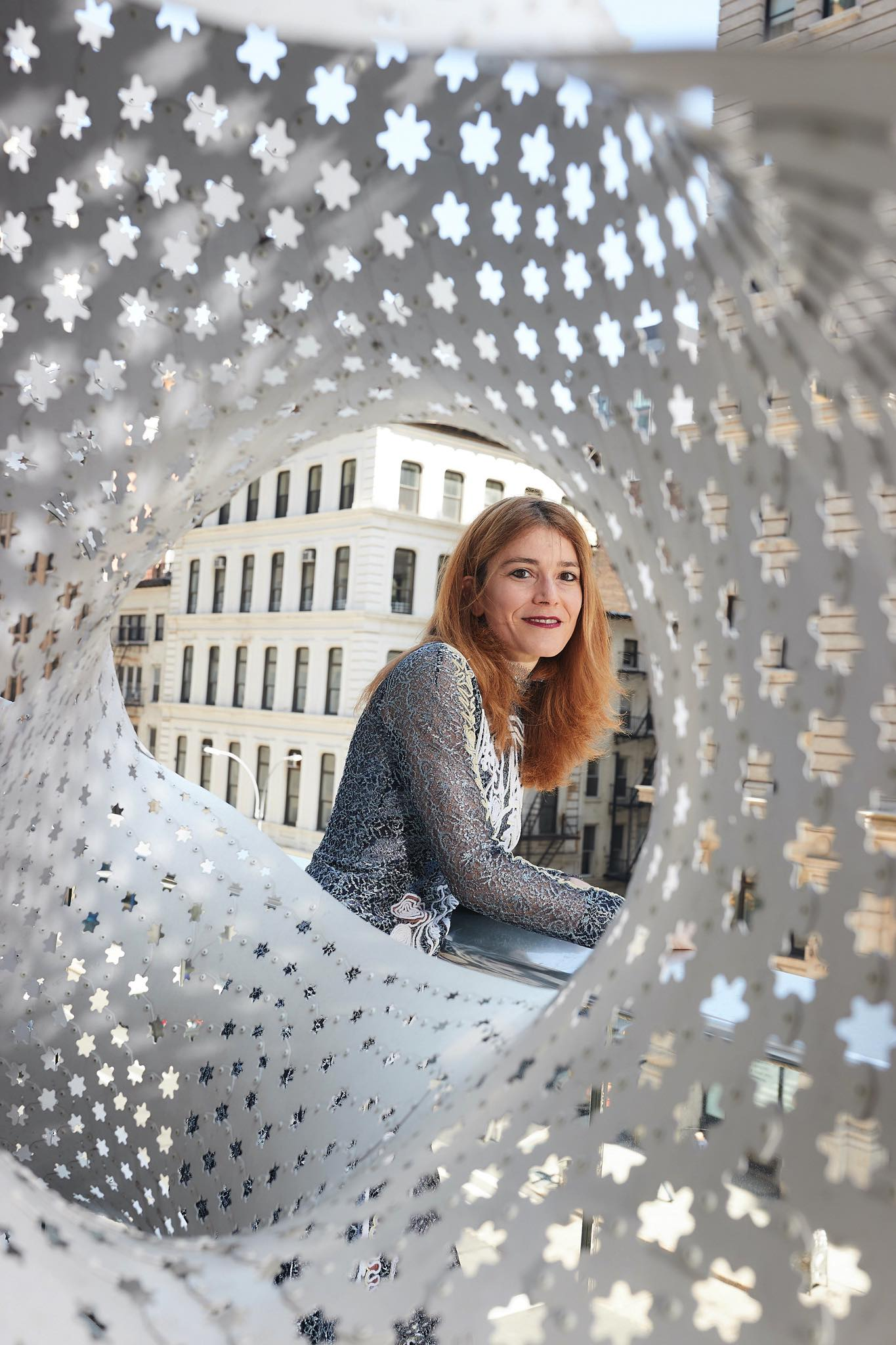
- Born: Sozita Goudouna; Athens, Greece
- Education: University of London MA, PHD; RADA Royal Academy of Dramatic Art MA
- Occupations: Art theorist, curator
- Known for: Samuel Beckett's Breath
- Awards: Andrew W. Mellon Foundation Post-Doctoral Fellowship; British Council Culture and Creativity UK Study Award; Alexander Onassis Public Benefit Foundation PHD Scholarship; Onassis Scholars Foundation Research Award

Sozita Goudouna (Greek: Σωζήτα Γκουντούνα) is a curator and professor, and the author of Beckett's Breath: Anti-theatricality and the Visual Arts, on Samuel Beckett's Breath, published by Edinburgh University Press and released in the US by Oxford University Press. In 2022, Goudouna launched the masters program "Breath Studies: Breath in the Visual and Performing Arts" at Goldsmiths, University of London. She is also the editor of the 2024 Performance Research issue "On Breath".

Goudouna was selected as the inaugural Andrew W. Mellon Foundation curator at the Performa festival in New York City. She served as the director of the first European-funded art residency and as the visual art consultant of the Onassis Foundation Festival in New York. She curated a project with Paul B. Preciado, with the participation of Karen Finley, at the Parliament of Bodies public arts program at Documenta 14, and in 2019, she joined the Raymond Pettibon Studio as head of operations. In 2020, Goudouna founded the NYC nonprofit organization Greece in USA with an international board of professionals, for the internalization of contemporary Greek art, which featured 150 Greek artists. In this context, she founded the art residency "the Library Residency" in Athens, and conceived the arts platform "ArtPort" in collaboration with the Piraeus Municipal Theatre, for the promotion of international art in Greece, which first presented Andres Serrano and John Akomfrah's video installation "the Airport" in Athens in 2021 and Arthur Jafa's "Love Is the Message, the Message Is Death".

In July 2022, she established the Opening Gallery in Tribeca, New York, as a nonprofit cultural venue that supports and donates to a charity dedicated to neurodiversity. The Opening Gallery has presented artists including Andres Serrano, Christopher Knowles, Orlan, Michele Zalopany, Kenneth Goldsmith, John Zorn, Shoplifter, Luciano Chessa, Yann Toma, Warren Neidich, Coleman Collins, Constance DeJong, Charles Gaines, Jimmie Durham, Leslie Hewitt, Agnieszka Kurant, Olu Oguibe, Martha Rosler, Allen Ruppersberg, Chrysanne Stathacos, Rainer Ganahl, Brenda Zlamany Leah Singer, and D. Graham Burnett, as well as readings of Edward Said's poems by Simon Critchley, Stathis Gourgouris, and Udi Aloni.

== Biography ==
=== Early life and education ===
Goudouna was born in Athens, Greece. She moved to London in 1996, where she settled until 2012. She received her BA (Hons) in Philosophy with Theatre from London Metropolitan University and has a Master of Arts in Text, Performance and Directing from the Royal Academy of Dramatic Art and in English literature from King's College London. She holds a PhD from the University of London on high modernist theory focusing on Michael Fried and the work of Samuel Beckett, supervised by David Bradby.

=== Beckett's Breath ===
In 2018, Goudouna published Beckett's Breath: Antitheatricality and the Visual Arts, through Edinburgh University Press The book analyses the ways Samuel Beckett's Breath, a thirty-second playlet for the stage that does not include actors, text, characters, or drama but only stage directions, became emblematic of the intermedia exchanges that occur in Beckett's later writings as well as the cross-fertilisation of theatre with visual arts. The book examines Beckett's ultimate venture to define the borders between a theatrical performance and purely visual representation and juxtaposes Breath with breath-related artworks by visual artists including Valie Export, Marcel Duchamp, Piero Manzoni, Gerhard Richter, Bridget Riley, Giuseppe Penone, John Latham, Vito Acconci, Chris Burden, Nancy Spero, Lygia Clark, Art & Language, and Marina Abramović.

=== Performa Biennial ===
Goudouna was selected in May 2015 as the first Andrew W. Mellon Foundation curatorial fellow at Performa. That year, she worked on the production of new commissions by artists Yvonne Rainer, Tania Bruguera, Francesco Vezzoli, David Hallberg, Juliana Huxtable, Robin Rhode, Laura Lima, Heather Phillipson, Edgar Arceneaux, and Erika Vogt, as well as Performa alums Jérôme Bel and Jesper Just, among others.

=== Raymond Roussel Society ===
Goudouna curated a production of Raymond Roussel's 1914 novel, Locus Solus, which was presented by Shunt Theatre from 2009 until 2010 at a number of locations, including the London Bridge and Elephant and Castle in England and the Byzantine and Christian Museum and Benaki Museum in Athens. She collaborated with Werner Nekes, Mat Collishaw, Flux Factory NYC, the International Institute for Important Items, and more than 100 artists and architects. On the basis of this project, Goudouna was invited to participate in a tribute to the American poet John Ashbery, who was honoured with the Raymond Roussel Society Medal in June 2017 in New York City.

=== Ecological activities ===
Goudouna has been involved in ecological activism. She ran in the 2010 municipal election on the island of Hydra as a member of the Ecological Association of Hydra, an organization whose aim is to protect the environment and cultural heritage, within the broad areas of archaeology, traditional settlements, and submarine antiquities, of the islands of Hydra and Dokos.

As a board member of the association, Goudouna co-organised projects in collaboration with the zoology department at the University of Athens, the University of the Aegean, the Ministry of the Environment, Energy and Climate Change, the European Union, and other organisations including WWF and the Society for the Study and Protection of the Mediterranean monk seal.

=== Opening Gallery ===
In July 2022, Goudouna established the Opening Gallery in Tribeca, New York, as a nonprofit cultural venue that supports and donates to Luv Michael, a charity dedicated to neurodiversity. The Opening Gallery has presented work by artists including ORLAN with La Maison Française of NYU, Andres Serrano, D. Graham Burnett, Michele Zalopany, Kenneth Goldsmith, John Zorn, Shoplifter, Luciano Chessa, Andres Serrano, Yann Toma, Warren Neidich, Coleman Collins, Constance DeJong, Charles Gaines, Jimmie Durham, Leslie Hewitt, Agnieszka Kurant, Olu Oguibe, Martha Rosler, Allen Ruppersberg, Chrysanne Stathacos, Rainer Ganahl, Brenda Zlamany, and Leah Singer, as well as readings of Edward Said's poems by Simon Critchley, Stathis Gourgouris, and Udi Aloni, among others. In April 2025, the Opening Gallery launched the SoHo Loft Project, with participating poet Max Blagg and artists Golnar Adili, Ellen Berkenblit, Ernesto Caivano, Eric Fischl, Nan Goldin, Michael Halsband, Curtis Kulig, Jamie Nares, Will Ryman, Ken Tisa, and Ryan Wallace.

== Bibliography ==
- 2018, Beckett's Breath: Antitheatricality and the Visual Arts Edinburgh University Press (ISBN 1474421644)
- 2021, Space, Kenji Aoki, Monograph; Kehrer Verlag, in English and German.
- 2023, Drawing and Performance: Creating Scenography
- 2024, Co-authored: Maria Shantelle Alexies Ambayec, Peter Burke, Renata Gaspar, Sozita Goudouna, Nilufer Gros, Adham Hafez, Jan-Tage Kuehling, Eero Laine, Sarah Lucie, Evan Moritz, Juliana Martins Rodrigues de Moraes, Malin Palani, Rumen Rachev, Aneta Stojnić, Kristof van Baarle. Mourning the Ends: Collaborative Writing and Performance. Punctum Books, 2024.
- 2026, "Theatre Things: Material Theories and Histories", Box of Breaths: The Trapdoor within the Limits of Representation. Edited by Andrew Friedman & Eero Laine. University of Michigan Press

== Articles ==
- 2008 Goudouna, Sozita (2008). "Mediated Breath". The International Journal of the Arts in Society: Annual Review. 3 (3): 115–130. doi:10.18848/1833-1866/CGP/v03i03/35492.
- 2008 Goudouna, Sozita (2008). "Critical Intersections: Education and the Expanding Site of Art Practice". The International Journal of the Arts in Society: Annual Review. 2 (4): 41–46. doi:10.18848/1833-1866/CGP/v02i04/35413.
- 2010 Goudouna, Sozita (2010). "Locus Solus". The International Journal of the Arts in Society: Annual Review. 4 (5): 465–482. doi:10.18848/1833-1866/CGP/v04i05/35754.
- 2012 Eleventh Plateau in Amber'11 Sanat ve Teknoloji Festivali / amber'11 Art and Technology Festival BIS, Body-Process Art Association ISBN 978-605-88807-6-4
- 2014 Contemplating Inactivity in Joo Yeon Park, Echo of Echo in English & Korean, Translation Sunghee Lee, Joseph Fungsang (Essays) Doryun Chong (Interview) Seoul: Doosan Gallery and Mediabus, 2014 ISBN 978-89-94027-41-8
- 2014 Goudouna, Sozita (2 January 2014). "Contemporary Greek Art: Impoverishment of Means Versus Abundance of Intentions". Journal of Poverty. 18 (1): 82–102. doi:10.1080/10875549.2013.866801. S2CID 144950109.
- 2014 Goudouna, Sozita. Palinhos, Jorge; Maia, Maria Helena (eds.). Marina Abramovic's Seven Deaths: Antiquity as a performing space. Dramatic Architectures: places of drama – drama for places. p. 60. hdl:10400.26/19888. ISBN 978-972-8784-59-1.
- 2014 Locus solus: Towards the Attributes of a New Artistic "Genre", par Sozita Goudouna in Roussel : Hier, aujourd'hui, caractéristiques, Direction : Pierre Bazantay, Christelle Reggiani, Hermes Salceda Editeur : Presses Universitaires de Rennes (site internet), Collection, Interférences, ISBN 978-2-7535-2938-0 Année de publication : 2014.
- 2016 Eco-Specificity: Performing the Heterogeneous Centre of the Ecological Imperative Written
- 2016 Personhood and the Allure of the Object in Critical Issues: The Visual in Performance Practice. Oxford, England, Interdisciplinary Press, 2010 ISBN 978-1-84888-066-5
- 2017 Theatricality and Non-Art in Theatricality and Theory. Topika ib Nissos Publications ISBN 978-960-8392-69-4
- 2018 Mat Chivers in Horea Avram (ed) Moving Images, Mobile Bodies. The Poetics and Practice of (Techno-) Corporeality in Performing and Visual Arts Edited by Horea Avram. Newcastle upon Tyne: Cambridge Scholars Publishing, Amsterdam University Press, 2018. ISBN 1-5275-1108-1
- 2020 Théâtre/Public Journal: Special Issue on Theatre and the Visual Arts | Interview with RoseLee Goldberg – Performa (performance festival)
- 2021 Chua, Shawn; Goudouna, Sozita; Hafez, Adham; Laine, Eero; Lucie, Sarah; Moraes, Juliana; Palani, Malin; Rachev, Rumen; Sidi, Leah (2021). "Theatre Essentials in Three Acts: Collaboration, Care, Time". Theatre Topics. 31 (2): 99–111. doi:10.1353/tt.2021.0025. S2CID 238928548. Project MUSE 802102.
- 2021 The Impossible Spectator: A collective essay by Renata Gaspar, Sozita Goudouna, Nilüfer Ovalıoğlu Gros, Jan-Tage Kühling, Eero Laine, Sarah Lucie, Juliana Moraes, Evan Moritz, Malin Palani, Kristof van Baarle. E-tcetera Magazine
- 2022 Ambayec, Alecks; Gaspar, Renata; Goudouna, Sozita; Kühling, Jan-Tage; Probst, Simon (31 December 2021). "Changing Perspectives on Performance Collaboration: Problematizing More-Than-Human Subjectivities". Global Performance Studies. 4 (2). doi:10.33303/gpsv4n2a4. S2CID 245379174.
- 2024 Driving a Driverless Train: Exhausting Extras and Automated Performance
- 2024 Editorial: On mundane performance
- 2024 Everywhere, All the Time, 3:42 Collaborative encounters with the mundane
- 2025 To teach as if there were no future Devon Baur, Electa Behrens, Felipe Cervera, Diana Damian Martin, Renata Gaspar, Sozita Goudouna, Kyoko Iwaki, Eero Laine, Sarah Lucie, Elizabeth McQueen, Theron Schmidt & Rajni Shah, Research in Drama Education: The Journal of Applied Theatre and Performance, 30:2, 209-221, DOI: 10.1080/13569783.2025.2515119
- 2025 On Breath Sozita Goudouna (2025) On Breath, Performance Research, 29:4-5, 1-10,DOI: 10.1080/13528165.2024.2523722

== Filmography ==
- 2016 Dogs of Democracy, directed by Mary Zournazi
- 2017 TV series on upcycling
- 2023 Sozita Goudouna featured in the series Routes of the Greek Diaspora by Maya Tsoclis

== Selected exhibitions ==
- 2011 Eleventh Plateau, Archeological Association Athens
- 2010 Locus Solus, Benaki Museum
- 2012 Un-Inhabited, Archeological Museum, Island of Delos
- 2012 Time to Open the Black Boxes by Danae Stratou, Zoumboulakis Galleries
- 2013 Between the Night and the Day and the Day and Night. Intervention in the public sphere by Mat Chivers. Monastiraki Square
- 2013 Accumulation solo booth project by Raqs Media Collective, Art-Athina International Art Fair
- 2013 The Metaphor of the Blind, in conjunction with Jacques Derrida Conference, French Institute
- 2014 Traces of Truth and Circles of Deceit: Beirut Entangled.Beirut: Bodies in Public Project.Public Intervention Martyrs' Square, Beirut
- 2014 One by One solo exhibition by Marie Voignier, First Official European Union Athens Art Residency
- 2014 Three Rituals for the Eco-city, solo exhibition and public art project by Miriam Simun, First Official European Union Athens Art Residency
- 2014 Three Chants Modern by Andrea Geyer, commissioned by MoMA, New York. Made possible by MoMA's Wallis Annenberg Fund for Innovation in Contemporary Art through the Annenberg Foundation. Art-Athina International Art Fair
- 2015 Performa 15 New York Biennial MoMA, Times Square, Marian Goodman Gallery, Brooklyn Academy of Music, Martha Graham Studio Theater, PARTICIPANT INC, Swiss Institute Contemporary Art New York, Roulette, Rhizome, Jewish Museum, Goethe Institute New York, Danspace Project, El Museo del Barrio, Printed Matter Inc
- 2015 Pavel Büchler solo booth project
- 2015 The Art of Technoetics: A Syncretic Strategy by Roy Ascott. The I-Node of the Planetary Collegium University of Plymouth, First Official European Union Athens Art Residency
- 2015 Like Water at a Buffet, solo exhibition & performance by Martin Creed; First Official European Union Athens Art Residency
- 2015 Comrades of Time, Andrea Geyer, Gilles Deleuze, and Felix Guattari – Refrains of Freedom International Conference. Museum of History University of Athens
- 2015 Lynda Benglis solo exhibition, First Official European Union Athens Art Residency
- 2015 Stray Dogs Project, solo exhibition and public intervention by Santiago Sierra, Syntagma Square
- 2016 ANTIGONE NOW Festival Onassis Foundation New York
- 2016 COMMONPLACE General Consulate of Greece in New York
- 2016 Navine G. Khan-Dossos solo booth project; Art-Athina International Art Fair
- 2016 Joo Yeon Park, O solo exhibition & performance, First Official European Union Athens Art Residency
- 2017 Documenta 14 International Exhibition Oracle Drawings Parliament of Bodies, Parko Eleftherias
- 2017 COMBAT BREATHING Participating artists: Valie Export, John Latham, Jesper Just, Kelly Nipper, Karen Finley, Liz Magic Laser, Nikos Navridis, Jenny Marketou, Peggy Kliafa; EMST National Contemporary Art Museum
- 2017 A CERTAIN BLUE OF THE SEA, 40 Artists Group Exhibition Ionian Parliament
- 2018 Trajal Harrell at Dystopian Pleasures by FYTA & the Ministry of Post Truth, Athens School of Fine Arts
- 2018 SHADOW LIBRARIES: UBUWEB Top Tens Exhibition, 24h Ubu Onassis Cultural Centre
- 2018 Theorems, AICA International Art Critics Association Annual Exhibition EMST National Contemporary Art Museum
- 2019 Whoever Shows: Strike Uyp th' Band! by Raymond Pettibon at the New Museum Co-presentation with Performa (performance festival) Performa 19 Biennial, produced by Sozita Goudouna
- 2019 OUT SCORE at Aexone, Onassis Foundation, and Onassis Scholars production, Group Exhibition with the participation of artists Maria Hassabi, Kelly Nipper, Michael Portnoy, Duke Riley, Alexandros Georgiou, Delia Gonzalez, Eleni Kamma, Kostis Velonis, Raymond Pettibon, Erlea Maneros Zabala, Ilan Manouach, Christian Wassmann, Vassilis Salpistis and Marie Voignier, Dionysis Kavalieratos, Maria Georgoula, Nikos Charalambidis, Olga Venetsianou, Angela Svoronou, Sotiris Karamanis, and Mark Aerial Waller.
- 2019 Kenji Aoki solo show, Warren st, New York
- 2019 UN/FASHION group exhibition at Megaron Athens Concert Hall for the first Athens Fashion Film Festival, initially launched in Milan by Constanza Cavalli, Etro.
- 2020 The Soft Clay of Our Generation by Raymond Pettibon
- 2021 The Airport video installation by John Akomfrah at Piraeus Municipal Theatre
- 2021 Andres Serrano solo exhibition at Piraeus Municipal Theatre
- 2021 Cameron Jamie at the Journal Gallery in New York
- 2021 The Right to Breathe at Undercurrent.nyc
- 2021 The Right to Silence? at Anya and Andrew Shiva Art Gallery, CUNY
- 2022 Arthur Jafa Love Is the Message, the Message Is Death solo exhibition, Piraeus Municipal Theatre
- 2023 Confessions solo exhibition by Andres Serrano with Gabriele Tinti poems and readings by Vincent Piazza with Eris Press at the Opening Gallery in Tribeca
- 2024 ORLAN a retrospective exhibition by Orlan, Opening Gallery, 42 Walker st in New York.
- 2024 For Freedoms intervention by For Freedoms, Hank Willis Thomas, Carrie Mae Weems, at Athens Epidaurus Festival
- 2024 Christopher Knowles & Sylvia Netzer's RELATiVE(s) A two person Exhibition, Watermill Center collaboration.
- 2024 A BOX OF BIRDS by ESTAR(SER) exhibition of artifacts and documentation associated with the Avis Tertia or Order of the Third Bird, a Watermill Center collaboration.
- 2025 SoHo Loft Project: Max Blagg group exhibition with Nan Goldin, Eric Fischl, among other artists
- 2025 Ahmed Yacoubi / The Alchemist Recipes / New York Arab Festival solo exhibition and performance by Emel Mathlouthi at Atelier Jolie, founded by Angelina Jolie and in collaboration with the Invisible Dog Art Center.
- 2025 Double Portrait: Paintings in Conversation Joan Bofill collaboration with the Opening Gallery. Multimedia portraits of David Lynch, Claudia Llosa, David Cronenberg, Guillermo del Toro, Mel Brooks; artists Jan Švankmajer, Joe Coleman, Johanna Went; George Saunders, Michel Butor, Armando Valladares; Jon Batiste; Garry Kasparov; Princess Karadordevic
- 2026 GENERATIVE REALITIES Opening Gallery New York. Participating artists: Nan Goldin, Max Blagg, Brenda Zlamany

== Editorial work ==
- 2009 Arts in Society Journal CommonGround Publishers, associate editor
- 2009 Naked But Safe, art editor
- 2011 STP: Studies in Theatre and Performance, associate editor
- 2017 Journal of Poverty, associate editor
- 2018 JAR Journal of Artistic Research, associate editor
- 2019 Performing Ends, contributing editor
- 2024 Performance Research, "On the Mundane" issue; editor
- 2025 Performance Research, "On Breath" issue; editor
- 2025 Imagined Theaters, SCALE
- 2025 Member of the editorial board of Performing Ethos: International Journal of Ethics in Theatre & Performance, Intellect Books (Journal)
- 2025 Member of the Arts in Society Advisory Board

== Awards ==
2022 British Council Culture and Creativity UK Study Award
