= Elizabeth Deering Hanscom =

American writer

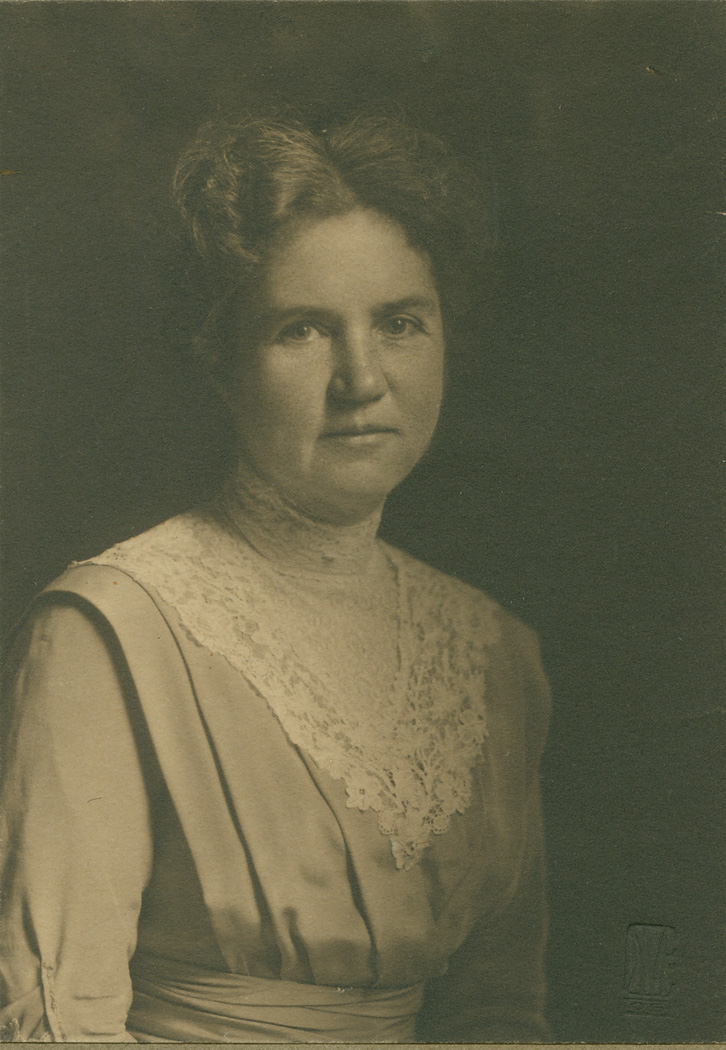
- Elizabeth Deering Hanscom, from about 1915
- Born: August 15, 1865; Saco, Maine
- Died: February 2, 1960 (aged 94); Weymouth, Massachusetts
- Occupations: Writer, college professor

Elizabeth Deering Hanscom (August 15, 1865 – February 2, 1960) was an American writer and college professor. In 1894, she was in the first group of seven women granted doctoral degrees at Yale University, and she taught English at Smith College from 1894 to 1932.

== Early life and education ==
Hanscom was born in Saco, Maine, the daughter of George A. Hanscom and Lizzie Deering Hanscom. Her father was a newspaper publisher. She graduated from Boston University in 1887. She completed a master's degree in English in 1892, and doctoral studies in 1894, at Yale University. She, Mary Augusta Scott, and Laura Johnson Wylie were the first cohort of women allowed to receive PhDs in English at Yale. Her dissertation was titled "(The) Domestic, Political, and Social Life of England During the Fourteenth Century, With Especial Reference to the Vision of Piers Plowman." At Yale she assisted Albert Stanburrough Cook in preparing A First Book in Old English: Grammar, Reader, Notes, and Vocabulary (1897).

== Career ==
Hanscom spent her academic career at Smith College, where she joined the faculty in 1894 and taught English until her retirement in 1932. She became a full professor in 1905, and held the Mary Augusta Jordan Chair in English. Journalist Nell Battle Lewis recalled Hanscom's course on Shakespeare as especially vivid and memorable.

Hanscom also taught at the summer teachers' institute and chautauqua at Fryeburg. She served on the board of directors of the Massachusetts Society for the Education of Women.

== Publications ==
- "The Allegory of de Lorris' Romance of the Rose" (1893)
- "The Argument of the Vision of Piers Plowman" (1894)
- The Second Part of Henry the Fourth
- "The Sonnet Forms of Wyatt and Surrey" (1901)
- "The Feeling for Nature in Old English Poetry" (1905)
- The Friendly Craft: A Collection of American Letters (1908)
- The Heart of the Puritan: Selections from Letters and Journals (1917)
- Sophia Smith and the Beginnings of Smith College (1925, with Helen French Greene)

== Personal life ==
Hanscom died in 1960, in Weymouth, Massachusetts, at the age of 94. There is a collection of her papers and belongings in Yale University Library. Yale offers an Elizabeth Deering Hanscom Fellowship in the Humanities. In 2016, a Brenda Zlamany portrait of the first seven women to receive Yale doctorates, including Hanscom, was placed in the Sterling Memorial Library at Yale.
