= Richard Conte (artist) =

French artist (born 1953)

Richard Conte (born June 12, 1953) is a contemporary artist and art professor.

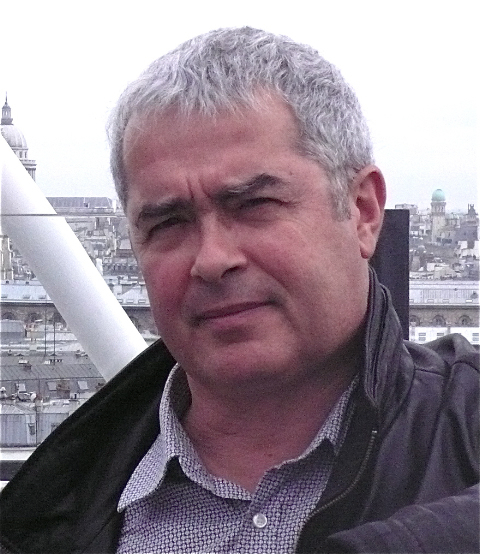
Conte in April 2010.

== Background and education ==
Conte studied plastic arts and art history at the French University University of Paris 1 Pantheon-Sorbonne. He then completed a PhD dissertation entitled Une Pratique Négative en Peinture, Poïétique de la Fragmentation, de l'Enlevage et de l'Obturation supervised by René Passeron. An Agrégé and a Doctor in Plastic Arts, he began teaching at the École Normale of Douai, l'Essonne and Cergy, and then at the university from 1983 onwards. In the mid-1990s, Conte obtained an accreditation to supervise research. He was subsequently elected director of the CERAP (Centre d'Etudes et de Recherche en Arts Plastiques) by the Scientific Council of the university and has been responsible for coordinating the seminar entitled Interface at the Sorbonne since 1999.

== Career ==
Since 2012, Conte is the director of ACTE Institute a research Mixt Unit of the French National Centre for Scientific Research and the University Paris 1 Panthéon Sorbonne. Conte has been director of the CERAP since the early 2000s. At about the same period, he was elected member of the Scientific Council of the Université Paris 1 Panthéon Sorbonne. As part of his mandate, Conte is also a member of the Council of the Doctoral School for Plastic Arts and Art Sciences at the Université Paris I Panthéon-Sorbonne.

== Latest appointments ==
- Appointed member of the Commission nationale consultative d'évaluation des enseignants des écoles d'art (national commission about art teachers valuation) of the French Ministry of Culture.
- Member of the research commission of the Délégation aux Arts plastiques (Plastik Art delegation).
- Member of the Board of research and studies at the ENSAD (École nationale supérieure des arts décoratifs).
- President of the jury for the promotion of the Professors of Plastic Arts and Art Sciences in Tunisia (2004–2007).
- Co-founder and managing editor of the journal Recherches poïétiques (poïetic researches).
- Founder and managing editor of the journal Plastik.
- Founder and Director of the collection Arts et monde contemporain (Art in the Contemporary world), Publications de la Sorbonne (Sorbonne publishing).
- Coordinator of the project Création et prospective, as part of the 2006–2007 / 2008–2009 projects comprised under the title La création à l'épreuve des risques majeurs (creation proof against major risks).

== Works ==
=== Solo exhibitions ===
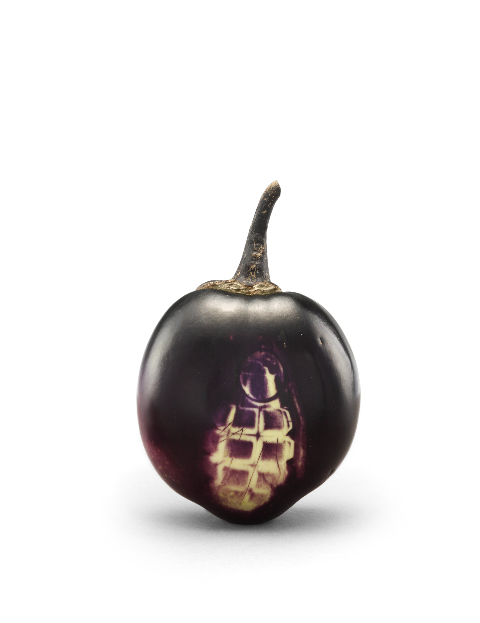
La Guerre des Aubergines (The war of eggplants), by Richard Conte.

- 1980 - Théâtre Nanterre-Amandiers, Nanterre, France (booklet)
- 1982 - Pierre Lescot Art Gallery, Paris (booklet)
- 1985 - Cultural Center Jacques Brel, Thionville, France
- 1986 - Museum Gauguin, Papeete (Tahiti) – Eros Errance Art Gallery, Rouen, France
- 1988 - Nicole Ferry Art Gallery, Paris (Catalogue) – University of Toulouse le Mirail
- 1989 - Nicole Ferry Art Gallery, Paris (Catalogue)
- 1992 - Nicole Ferry Art Gallery, Paris (Catalogue) – Art et essai, Art Gallery, Rennes, France
- 1993 - University of Pau, France
- 1994 - Museum of Bourges, France (Book) – Foundation of Roger Van Rogger, Bandol
- 1996 - Nicole Ferry Art Gallery, Paris. Les Autonus (the self nudes)
- 1997 - Château de Dampierre, Anzin (North of France), Les Années Rondes (The round years), 1996–1986
- 2000 - Museum of Contemporary Art at Seoul National University (Korea), (with Jean-Pierre Brigaudiot), edition of an art booklet
- 2001 - Contemporary Art Space Camille Lambert, city of Juvisy-sur-Orge, France (catalogue) - Performance entitled L'abeille qui fait son miel (Photographed by Yann Toma)
- 2002 - KBS Television Gallery, Busan, South Korea: Mondial 98 – Museum of Contemporary Art at Busan, South Korea
- 2004 - Performance entitled Bille en tête for the opening of the Festival Chalon-dans-la-rue.
- 2005 - Museum Nicéphore Niépce, Chalon-sur-Saône, France
- 2005-2006 - Pommes Libertines, Potager du roi, grotte du Parc Balbi, Château de Versailles.
- 2009 - Deborah Zafman Art Gallery, Paris
- 2012 - Premier Festival international d'art contemporain de Moroni, Comoros
- 2013 - Galerie du Tableau, Marseille, (with Jiří Kornatovský)
- 2015 - 16 September – 16 October, Ladislav Sutnar Gallery, Plzeň (Czech Republic) : « L'amour et la guerre à Versailles », dans le cadre de Pilsen, capitale européenne de la culture 2015. Láska a válka ve Versailles / L'amour et la guerre à Versailles, Richard Conte, Catalogue de l'exposition à la galerie Ladislav Sutnar Gallery, Plzeň. Texts by Josef Mištera, Jiří Kornatovský, Richard Conte. Edition of University of West Bohemia, 70 pages.

=== Group exhibitions ===
- 1998 June–July Catalogue - Conte produced 64 paintings during the 64 games of the FIFA World Cup, each of them being strictly produced within the time of the corresponding game.
- 2005 January–May - L'art, Un Cas d'Ecole, Museum of Education for the department, Saint-Ouen l'Aumône. Light installation entitled Gobostensibles, in collaboration with François Salis. Catalogue, text written by Romane Boyard. Nicole Ferry Art Gallery (Paris).

=== Conte as exhibition curator ===
- September 2004 – Laborinthe, Fondation Avicenne, Cité Internationale Universitaire de Paris.
- October 2005 – Le bout du monde (the ends of the earth), Cité Internationale Universitaire de Paris.
- October–November 2007 – Proliférer (Prolifering), Villa Savoye, Poissy, France.

== Bibliography ==
=== Latest books ===
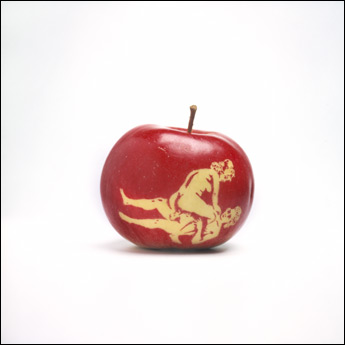
Pommes Libertines [Libertine Apples], by Richard Conte.

- Le Dessin Hors Papier (the drawing/design out of paper), Ed., introduction and article. Collective work, Publications de la Sorbonne, Paris, (ISBN 978-2-85944-612-3), 2009 (254 p.).
- Du Sacré dans l'Art Actuel (some sacred in current art), (with Marion Laval‐Jeantet), Paris, Ed. Klincksieck, 2008 (172 p.).
- Inimages, with René Passeron et Jean Lancri, Ed. Klincksieck, Paris, pp. 54 to 78. Cruautés pures (pure cruelty), sur quelques inimages de René Passeron, (ISBN 9782252036716), 2008.
- Pommes Libertines, with Emmanuel Pierrat, Ed. Bernard Pascuito, Paris, (ISBN 978-2-35085-044-3), 2008.
- Qu'est-ce que l'Art Domestique ? (what is domestic art ?), Ed. and introduction, Publications de la Sorbonne, (ISBN 2-85944-553-6) - (ISBN 9782859445539), 2004 (184 p).
- L'Art Contemporain au Risque du Clonage (Contemporary Art to cloning risk), Publications de la Sorbonne, Ed. Broché, (ISBN 2-85944-469-6), 2002 (243p.).
- Le Mode Mineur de la Création, Proceedings of the Third International Symposium on Poietics, (with J. C. Le Gouic) Ed. Aléas, Lyon, 1996 (354 p.).
- L'Usine dans l'Espace Francilien, Publications de la Sorbonne, (with Martine Tabeaud), 2001.
- A vos marques ! Sport, Art et Architecture, Publications de la Sorbonne, 2001 (with Martine Tabeaud), (244 p.).
- En Attendant que Ca Sèche (waiting that it dries), journal Extime 1989–1993, Ed. Musées du Berry. 1994.

=== Journals edited by Richard Conte ===
- Journal Plastik Arts/Sciences (available on line) 4 issues published between 2001 and 2004. Publications de la Sorbonne.
- Recherches poïétiques, 9 issues published between 1994 and 2000. University Press of Valenciennes / International Society for Poietics.

=== Latest symposia and conferences ===
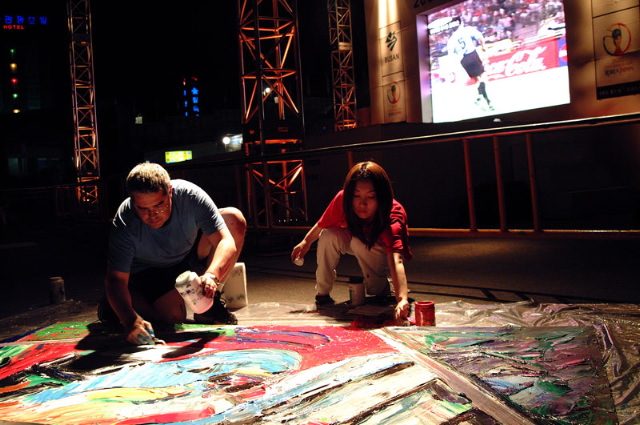
Performance of Richard Conte.

- 2010 : 9 to 11 May, Poïétique de la bande-annonce, in Cinéma et Philosophie, symposium hosted by the university of Oran, Algeria, and coordinated by Benmeziane Bencherki.
- 2009 :
  - 5–6 December : L'imprévisible, Le bleu du ciel et Les caprices de l'aubergine, in L'imprévisible, Symposium on Aesthetics hosted by the CEREAP, at the IUFM of Martinique and coordinated by Dominique Berthet.
  - 19 to 23 November : Autonomie de l'art, l'artiste a-t-il tous les droits ? in Philosopher aux portes du désert : L'idée d'autonomie et ses enjeux ontologiques, critiques et politiques, Tozeur (Tunisia), Institut Supérieur des Etudes Appliquées en Humanités de Tozeur (ISEAHT). Research unit "Lumières et Modernité" (03/UR/02-07). Research unit in philosophy «PHILAB» (University of Tunis). UNESCO Chair in Philosophy at the University of Tunis. The CERPHI (UMR 5037, ENS-LSH of Lyon, France). For the World Philosophy Day. TOZEUR, (Tunisia).
  - 8 to 10 June : Globalisation et mondialité à travers la photographie in Création, Représentation et pratique des arts en Méditerranée (redécouvertes et frayages contemporains), 2d session, La ville et l'espace. University of Oran (Algéria), Department of Social Sciences. Research unit Philosophie et son histoire. Network of researchers from the AUF Diversité des Expressions Culturelles et Artistiques, et Mondialisations.
  - 20 April to 1 May : Ah Dieu que la terre est jolie ! in Paysage européen & Mondialisation - Lettres, arts et sciences humaines - Florence, Villa Finally, coordinated by Aline Bergé, (Paris 3) Michel Collot (Paris 3) and Jean Mottet. (paris 1)
  - 15–17 March : at Hammamet, L'Instance Technologique, Ferment ou Obstacle pour la création, (closing conference), 12th International Symposium of the ATEP (Tunisian Association of Aesthetics and Poietics): Dimension esthétique, Art et Multimédia, supervised by Rachida Triki (Tunis 1).
  - 13–15 March : La Création, le Profane et le Sacré in Le Sacré et le Profane : Manifestations et Enjeux dans l'Expression Artistique Contemporaine, Institute of Fine Arts of Sousse (ISBAS Sousse), Tunisia.
- 2008
  - 11–13 December : Le festin des pommes libertines in Les Festins et les Arts, Staterooms of Guînes, Arras, for the international symposium organized by the university of Artois and coordinated by Amos Fercombé (Textes et culture EA 4028).
  - 7–9 November : Un Artiste Contemporain : Mounir FATMI in L'Art Contemporain : Formes, Références Conceptuelles, Limites ..., African Queen Hotel, Hammamet, Tunisia, coordinated by Samir Triki, the ISBAT, Tunis and the CERAP, Paris 1.
- 2007
  - 3–5 December : L'Ipodologie Créatrice, in French Philosophy and Contemporary Art, Florida Atlantic University, Boca Raton, United States. (invited by Richard Shusterman).
  - 9–11 November : Les Formes Contemporaines de l'Engagement Artistique, at the International Symposium hosted by the University of Gabès, Tunisia, and entitled Art, environnement et développement durable, coordinated by Med Mohsen Zerai.
  - 18–20 March : Pommes libertines; une parodie d'orientalité in Orient / occident : les arts dans le prisme exogène, 10th symposium of the ATEP, coordinated by Rachida Triki and hosted by the University of Tunis 1, Hammamet.
