= Albert Stanburrough Cook =

American philologist

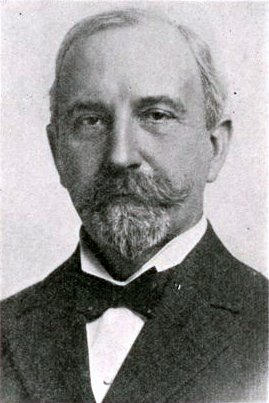
- Born: March 6, 1853; Montville, New Jersey, U.S.
- Died: September 1, 1927 (aged 74); New Haven, Connecticut
- Education: Rutgers College (BA, MS); University of Göttingen; University of Leipzig; University of Jena (PhD)
- Occupation: Professor at Yale University
- Known for: Translation and criticism of Old English works
- Notable work: The Christ of Cynewulf; Judith, an Old English Epic Fragment (crit. ed.)

Albert Stanburrough Cook (March 6, 1853 – September 1, 1927) was an American philologist, literary critic, and scholar of Old English. He has been called "the single most powerful American Anglo-Saxonist of the nineteenth and twentieth centuries."

== Life ==
Cook was born in Montville, New Jersey. He began working as a mathematics tutor at sixteen and was offered a chemistry professorship in Fukui, Japan before entering college, which he declined. He graduated with a Bachelor of Science degree from Rutgers College in 1872, writing a thesis on "The Inclined Planes of the Morris Canal," and taught there and at Freehold Academy while completing a Master of Science degree.

Having already learned German, he went on to study in Göttingen and Leipzig from 1877 to 1878, where he began learning languages including Latin, Greek, Italian, and Old English. He returned to the United States for two years as an associate in English at Johns Hopkins University, then in 1881 he spent time in London with phoneticist Henry Sweet studying manuscripts of Cynewulf and the Old Northumbrian Gospels at the British Museum. This work allowed him to complete a PhD in 1882 at the University of Jena, where he studied under Eduard Sievers. Cook became a professor of English in the University of California in 1882, where he re-organized the teaching of English in the state of California, introduced English requirements for university admission, and edited many texts for reading in secondary schools. He became chair of English language and literature at Yale University in 1889, where he remained for thirty-two years until his death and became a prolific editor of major English works and literary criticism. In contrast to the prejudices of many of his peers, a number of female PhD students - including Elizabeth Deering Hanscom, Martha Anstice Harris, Laura Lockwood, Mary Augusta Scott, and Caroline Louisa White - studied under Cook at a time when such students were rare.

Cook's best-known scholarly work is in Old English and in poetics, fields in which he produced over three hundred publications. He translated, edited, and revised Sievers' Old English Grammar (1885), edited Judith (1888), The Christ of Cynewulf (1900), Asser's Life of King Alfred (1905), and The Dream of the Rood (1905), and prepared A First Book in Old English Grammar (1894). He also edited, with annotations, Sidney's Defense of Poesie (1890); Shelley's Defense of Poetry (1891); Newman's Poetry (1891); Addison's Criticisms on Paradise Lost (1892); The Art of Poetry (1892), being the essays of Horace, Vida and Boileau; and Leigh Hunt's What is Poetry (1893); and published Higher Study of English (1906).

== Personal life and death ==
Cook married twice: first to Emily Chamberlain (1886), then to Elizabeth Merrill (1911). He died on September 1, 1927, in New Haven, Connecticut.

== Bibliography ==
=== Books ===
- The Phonological Investigation of Old English (1888)
- Pen Sketches and Reminiscences of Sixty Years (1901)
- The Higher Study of English (1906)
- Select Translations from Old English Prose (1908)
- The Authorized Version of the Bible and Its Influence (1910)
- The Last Months of Chaucer's earliest patron (1916)
- The Possible Begetter of the Old English Beowulf and Widsith (1922)
- The Old English Andreas and Bishop Acca of Hexham (1924)
- Cynewulf's Part In Our Beowulf (1925)
- The Aims in the Teaching of English Literature (1925)
- Beowulfian and Odyssian Voyages (1926)
- Sources of the Biography of AIdhelm (1927)

=== Textbooks ===
- Anglo-Saxon (1879)
- A First Book in Old English Grammar (1894)
- Exercises in Old English (1899)
- Literary Middle English Reader (1915)

=== Reference works ===
- Extracts from the Anglo Saxon Laws (1880)
- A Bibliography of Chaucer (1886)
- A Glossary of The Old Northumbrian Gospels (1894)
- Biblical Quotations in Old English Prose Writers (1898)
- A Concordance to the English Poems of Thomas Gray (1908)
- A Concordance to Beowulf (1911)

=== Critical editions ===
- Judith, an Old English Epic Fragment (1888)
- Shelly, Percy. (1890) Defense of Poetry
- Sidney, Philip. (1890) The Defense of Poesy
- Newman, John Henry.

(1891) Poetry, With Reference to Aristotle's Poetics
(1892) The Art of Poetry: Containing the Poetical Treatises of Horace, Vida and Boileau, with the translations of Howes, Pitt and Soame

- Leigh, Hunt. (1893) What Is Poetry
- Milton, John. (1896) Paradise Lost, Books I and II
- Burke, Edmund. (1896) Speech on Conciliation with America
- Tennyson, Lord Alfred. (1897) The Princess
- The Christ of Cynewulf (1900; 1909 (2nd ed.))
- Bacon, Francis. (1904) Advancement of Learning
- The Dream of the Rood: an Old English Poem attributed to Cynewulf (1905)
- Sir Eglamour: A Middle English Romance (1911)
- The Old English Elene, Phoenix, and Physiologus (1919)
- The Old English Physiologus (1921). Trans. James Hall Pitman
- Addison, Joseph. (1926) Criticisms on Paradise Lost

=== Translations ===
- Siever, Eduard. (1885) An Old English Grammar
- Asser, John. (1906) Life of King Alfred

=== Edited volumes ===
- The Bible and English Prose Style: Selections and Comments (1892)
- Selected Translations from Old English Prose (1908), ed. with Chauncey Brewster Tinker
- Some Accounts of the Bewcastle Cross Between the Years 1607 and 1861 (1914)
