= Ryan Wallace =

Ryan Wallace may refer to:

- Ryan Wallace (artist) (born 1977), multi-media artist
- Ryan Wallace (footballer) (born 1990), Scottish footballer
