= Constance DeJong =

Constance DeJong may refer to:

- Constance DeJong (writer) (born 1945), American writer and performance artist
- Constance DeJong (visual artist) (born 1950) American sculptor and painter
