= Elga Ruth Wasserman =

German-born American chemist and college administrator (1924–2014)

Elga Wasserman
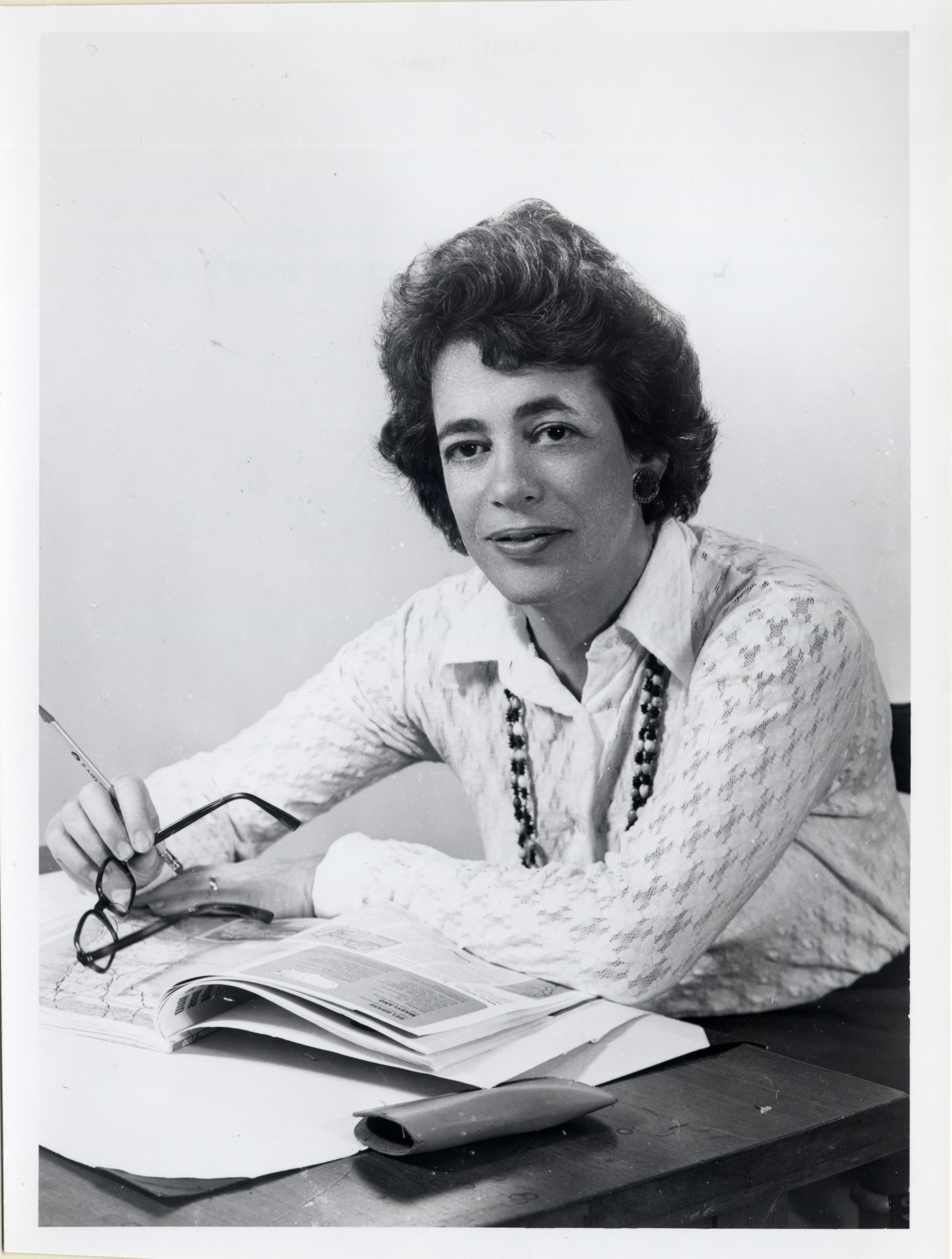
- Born: Elga Ruth Steinherz; June 30, 1924; Berlin, Germany
- Died: November 11, 2014 (aged 90)
- Education: Smith College (BA 1945); Radcliffe College/Harvard University (PhD in Chemistry 1949); Yale School of Law (JD 1976)
- Occupations: Yale University Special Assistant to President for Coeducation; Author; Attorney
- Spouse: Harry Wasserman
- Children: 3

Elga Ruth Wasserman (née Steinherz; June 30, 1924 – November 11, 2014) guided the transformation of Yale College from an all-male undergraduate college into a coeducational institution. She held the newly created position of special assistant to the president of Yale University on the education of women (1968–1972). She became a proponent of equal rights for women during Second-wave feminism and after. Later, Wasserman practiced law, specializing in family law, and advocated policies friendly to women and minorities in the workplace. She wrote The Door in the Dream (published by the National Academy of Sciences 2000), highlighting eminent female scientists through interviews and discussion.

== Early life and education ==
Elga Ruth Steinherz was born in Berlin, Germany on June 30, 1924. She immigrated to the United States with her family when she was a teenager (1936). She graduated summa cum laude from Smith College in 1945. In 1949 she earned a PhD in organic chemistry, technically from Radcliffe College.

== Professional life ==
After marrying fellow chemist Harry Wasserman in 1947, the couple moved to New Haven, Connecticut where Harry joined the Yale faculty in the Department of Chemistry. Elga took a position as a research assistant in microbiology and in chemistry at the university. While raising three children, she taught chemistry at Southern Connecticut State University and Quinnipiac College, and worked part-time in industry.

In 1962 Wasserman took a position as the assistant dean of the Yale Graduate School for physical and biological sciences. She held that position until 1968, when Yale abruptly decided to admit women to Yale College. At that time, President of Yale, Kingman Brewster, Jr., tapped her to lead Yale into coeducation. Her title was "Special Assistant to the President on the Education of Women". She was also the Chairman of the Committee on Coeducation. Her request to assume the title of "Associate Dean of Yale College," a familiar role in the Yale community, was denied her because, as Brewster told her, it would be demeaning to male deans if a woman were to hold the same rank.

=== Coeducation at Yale ===
Yale's November 1968 decision to admit undergraduate women beginning in the fall of 1969 gave the university little time to prepare for the transition. President Brewster told Wasserman to make Yale "a good place for women." One of her first tasks, in partnership with Brewster's advisor, Henry "Sam" Chauncey, was selecting which women would be accepted. She considered Chauncey a mentor and supporter throughout her work on coeducation.

Once students arrived on campus in September 1969, Wasserman was responsible not only for the well-being of incoming female students; she had to navigate the male-dominated traditional Yale culture, often without administrative support. Among the difficult topics in the first years of coeducation was how to improve the female to male ratio of students and of faculty. The ratio of undergraduate women to men was 1:7 in 1969–70, and there were only 12 female tenure-track faculty members and 660 men.

As Sam Chauncey commented about the university in 1969, "just everything – is masculine." Bringing approximately 550 young women into a student body of 4,000 undergraduate men and helping the women establish themselves as full-fledged Yalies was Wasserman's assignment.

Chauncey reflected on working with Wasserman: "Elga approached her work in coeducation with diplomacy, firmness, and creative thinking. She knew there were those at Yale who opposed coeducation and she handled them with tact and skill. But when it came to crucial issues, she knew how to stand her ground and make sure the women of Yale got the best Yale could offer. ... No single person did more to assure that coeducation went well than Elga, and today's Yale women owe her a great debt of gratitude. She was a joy to work with, for she had a wonderful sense of humor and never took herself too seriously."

In 2014, Wasserman was remembered by current Yale President Peter Salovey, who noted her "profound impact" on the university and stated that "it is no exaggeration to say that she paved the way for generations of Yale women."

Wasserman's perspective on women's rights evolved over the course of her tenure in administration at Yale. She stated that, "before coming to Yale I had never been concerned with women's rights" and at the end of the first year of coeducation, "These girls have just as much interest in being people as in being someone's wife."

In response to student interest, Wasserman initiated Women’s Studies (now Women’s, Gender, and Sexuality) courses, first through residential college seminars, which could be implemented without going through the formal course approval process. The first Women's Studies course was "Women in a Male Society," and Yale was one of only ten U.S. colleges to offer it at the time.

=== Continuing to develop as a feminist ===
After shepherding the First Women of Yale (Classes of 1971 – 1973) through their undergraduate experiences, Wasserman left her position in the university administration in 1972. Her experiences had introduced her to issues of gender parity and equal access, influencing her decision to study law. She then entered Yale Law School, from which she graduated in 1976. After a clerkship with the US Court of Appeals, Second Circuit, Wasserman practiced family law in New Haven until retiring in 1995.

Wasserman's role at Yale informed her evolving understanding of women's roles, and she began writing about young women's changing perspectives and goals in the early 1970s. She continued to document women's experiences and to propose policy changes that would better accommodate career paths that women were choosing.

Broadening her understanding of women's and family issues, Wasserman was an early member of the Carnegie Council on Children, a study group set up in 1972 by the Carnegie Corporation.

Wasserman continued to research gender equity issues and reflected on her own experience as a self-described "science dropout." Impressed that some notable women in science were able to overcome obstacles unique to their gender, Wasserman sought explanations of why and how relatively few women became successful scientists but most dropped out. With funding from the Spencer Foundation, she developed her book, The Door in the Dream: Conversations with Eminent Women in Science. The 26 subjects of her book were all women who had been appointed to the National Academy of Sciences. Wasserman documented their experiences relating to gender parity and their scientific careers. In addition to writing about the individual scientists, Wasserman developed a series of policy recommendations that would alter traditional norms in science and give women more opportunities for advancement and inclusion. She identified the importance of achieving a critical mass of women working together to overcome perceived marginalization in a company or research lab. Through her research and interviews with these scientists, Wasserman found that many of these successful women felt the need to hide their personal lives in order to be taken seriously in their careers. The Door in the Dream has been recognized as a valuable contribution to the record of women in science.

Wasserman followed up the book with numerous lectures and discussions on the challenges female academics face in the workplace.

Wasserman moved to Lexington, Massachusetts in 2006 and died November 11, 2014.

== Recognition ==
Since 1995, the Yale Department of Women's, Gender, and Sexuality Studies has honored Wasserman and a student with the Elga Wasserman Award, which is "given to a senior who has shown extraordinary commitment to the advancement of social justice and gender equality at Yale College.”

In 2021, the Yale Women Faculty Forum initiated the Elga R. Wasserman Courage, Clarity, and Leadership Award, honoring a Yale woman "who has demonstrated tremendous courage, clarity, and leadership in their community service. The award recognizes the important contributions of women faculty and staff who are committed to building equity, diversity, and inclusion and have excelled in articulating and advancing the highest aspirations of the entire Yale community. This award is named after Elga Ruth Wasserman, whose trailblazing career in the University’s administration and extraordinary advocacy on behalf of Yale women in the early years of coeducation continues to inspire future champions of gender equity and diversity in higher education.”

The first recipient of the Elga Wasserman award was Dr. Stephnie Spangler (MD), Clinical Professor of OB/GYN at the Medical School, Vice Provost for Health Affairs and Academic Integrity and University Title IX Coordinator.

In 2023, to recognize her role as a "champion" for women students, Yale University commissioned a portrait of Elga Wasserman by artist Brenda Zlamany. During a portrait-unveiling ceremony, Yale president Peter Salovey announced that the portrait would go on permanent display in Bass Library, one of the most actively used libraries on campus.

== Works and publications ==
Women and Women's Rights

- Wasserman, Elga R. "Equal Opportunity for Women in the Sciences: An Unfinished Agenda." Bulletin of Science, Technology and Society, v. 23, issue 1, pp 48–49 https://journals.sagepub.com/doi/abs/10.1177/0270467602239773 First Published February 1, 2003
- Wasserman, Elga. (2003). "The Public and Private Personae of Women in Science." Yale Journal of Biology and Medicine 76 pp. 163–165.
- Wasserman, Elga. (2000). The Door in the Dream: Conversations with Eminent Women in Science. Washington, D.C. ISBN 0309086191
- Wasserman, Elga R., et al. (August 1982). “The Changing Status of Women Attorneys in Connecticut.” Connecticut Bar Journal v. 56: 344–348
- Wasserman, Elga Ruth, Arie Y. Lewin, and Linda H. Bleiweis. (1975). Women in Academia: Evolving Policies toward Equal Opportunities, Praeger Special Studies in U.S. Economic, Social, and Political Issues. New York.
- Wasserman, Elga Ruth. "Changing Aspirations of College Women." Journal of the American College Health Association, 21, 4, 333–35, Apr 73

Academia – Graduate Study

Wasserman, E. R. and Switzer, E. (1967). The Random House Guide to Graduate Study in the Arts and Sciences. New York.
