= The Order of the Third Bird =

Artist collective

The Order of the Third Bird (also known as Avis Tertia or OTB) is a loose collective of artists, scholars, and practitioners dedicated to developing and performing protocols of sustained attention to works of art. The Order takes its name from an apocryphal story about the ancient Greek painter Zeuxis, in which a third bird contemplates a painting rather than being fooled by it or frightened away. Swiss literary theorist Yves Citton described their work as a form of "attentional activism" and considered them as "attention attendants" who cultivate sustained attention while nourishing works that suffer from lack of attention.

== History ==
The Order derives its name from a tale about the ancient Greek painter Zeuxis. According to the story, Zeuxis painted an image of a boy carrying grapes and left it outside to observe how birds would react. Three birds approached: the first pecked at the painted fruit (fooled by the illusion), the second saw the boy and flew away frightened, but a third bird stopped and assumed a pose of contemplation, "seemingly lost in thought." This third bird, who stops to contemplate a work of art, inspired the Order to formalize what they call "a practical aesthesis" focused on the object itself rather than its history or meaning.

The exact origins and historical development of the Order remain unclear. Members have been described as "guerrilla philosophers," "an a-hierarchical acephalous body," and "practitioners of Practical Aesthesis."

The group operates somewhere at the intersection of performance art, aesthetic theory, and contemplative practice. Swiss literary theorist Yves Citton describes the Order as an "international collective" whose "precise origins and real extent remain quite mysterious," noting that members gather intermittently at various locations worldwide.

Historical documentation suggests possible activities dating to the 1870s. The "Fascicle of E.," a collection of archival materials housed in the W-Cache maintained by ESTAR(SER), contains letters and diary entries from Paris in 1874-1875 that describe practices resembling the Order's protocols. These documents include a diary entry dated September 12, 1874, that outlines four phases: "Rencontre," "Regarder," "Vider (Annuler)," and "Realiser"—French terms that correspond to the Order's contemporary protocol.

=== Contemporary manifestations ===
The Order's activities have been documented in various locations including "a library in Jerusalem, a masonic lodge in Los Angeles, a disused railway tunnel in London, the bank of a small creek in rural Pennsylvania, and the 33rd Bienal de São Paulo" in 2018. Polish writer Agnieszka Gratza observed that "once they begin attending, they stay for what seems like ages—certainly long enough to disrupt the usual gallery conventions."

The Order has been described as a "secret society of writers and artists" who gather to view artworks in structured sessions. Their activities have been featured in museum exhibitions and workshops, including the 2016 exhibition "Wound: Mending Time and Attention" at Cooper Union, where participants engaged in what the American art historian and critic Martha Schwendener called a "fun and supremely geeky three-hour protocol for looking at art objects."

== Practices and philosophy ==
=== Joint attentional protocols ===
The Order practices what Citton describes as "joint attentional protocols" that draw upon collective attention techniques to transform the experience of artwork. These protocols rely on participants' ability to alter their attention in concert, hence "providing powerful impressions whose specificity has much to do with the nature and tonality of the group."

=== The four-phase protocol ===
The Order's central practice is a structured protocol consisting of four distinct phases through which participants collectively engage with a work of art or object. According to Nathan Heller's reporting, these sessions typically last twenty-eight minutes, divided into four seven-minute phases:

1. Encounter (Attending): Participants approach and initially engage with the work
2. Attending (Looking): Sustained observation of the work
3. Negation (Emptying): A phase where participants look away from the work and "purge it from their brains"
4. Realization (Realizing): Return to the work with renewed perception

The duration of these protocols can vary significantly, ranging from circa thirty minutes to twenty-four hours according to Citton. He wrote:

"at the Venice Biennale, passersby curious about the spectacle of adults silently observing an artwork for an obviously long period, may have spontaneously altered their own attention, thus serving as a relay for the attentional diffusion of works."

Literary critic Jennifer Roberts, who assigns three-hour observation exercises inspired by similar practices, argues that such extended attention "serves as a master lesson in the value of critical attention, patient investigation, and skepticism about immediate surface appearances," skills she considers essential for "academic or civic life in the twenty-first century."

French intellectual historian Maxime Boidy connects their practice to W.J.T. Mitchell's canonical question "What do images want?" Boidy describes Order members as "infirmiers de l'attention" (attention nurses) who "develop rituals that consist of gathering in front of a neglected work, image, or architectural form to compensate for its attentional deficit," suggesting that what images fundamentally want is attention.

=== Attentional activism ===
Citton frames the Order's work within the broader framework of "attentional activism," positioning their practices as a response to contemporary attention crises. He describes members as functioning like "attention attendants" or "attention nurses," with their prolonged observation sessions serving as "care exercises" for artworks that "are suffering from the lack of attention paid to them." Their work represents an intervention in what Citton calls the "attentional flows" of contemporary culture, where artworks often receive only fleeting glances.

The concept of attention activism has gained scholarly interest, with Alice Bennett noting in her review of D. Graham Burnett and Justin E.H. Smith's Scenes of Attention that there is "an appetite for stories of attention activism which would develop the political and ethical implications of understanding attention as something communicable."

== Research ==
=== ESTAR(SER) ===
The Esthetical Society for Transcendental and Applied Realization (sometimes with "Now including the Society of Esthetic Realizers" added), known as ESTAR(SER), is a scholarly body that researches the historicity and practices of The Order of the Third Bird. ESTAR(SER) maintains what it calls "The W-Cache," described as a vast archive of materials related to the Order's history and activities. The society publishes research in The Proceedings of ESTAR(SER) and collaborated on the book In Search of the Third Bird, published by Strange Attractor Press.

The society's editorial committee has been responsible for transcribing and publishing historical documents related to the Order, including the "Fascicle of E." materials.

== Reception ==
The Order's practices have influenced discussions in attention studies, museum education, and contemplative pedagogy. Their work has also been cited in debates about digital distraction, with some viewing their protocols as potential "training apparatuses for attention" in an age of information overload.

American cultural theorist Dominic Pettman has discussed the Order's practices within the broader context of attention ecology and the need for alternative forms of mediated attention that resist the "sophisticated hijacking of our minds" by digital platforms.

== See also ==
- Attention
- Performance art
- Aesthetics
- Attention economy
- Slow movement (culture)
- Visual studies
- Museum education
