= Comme des Marxists =

American clothing and lifestyle brand

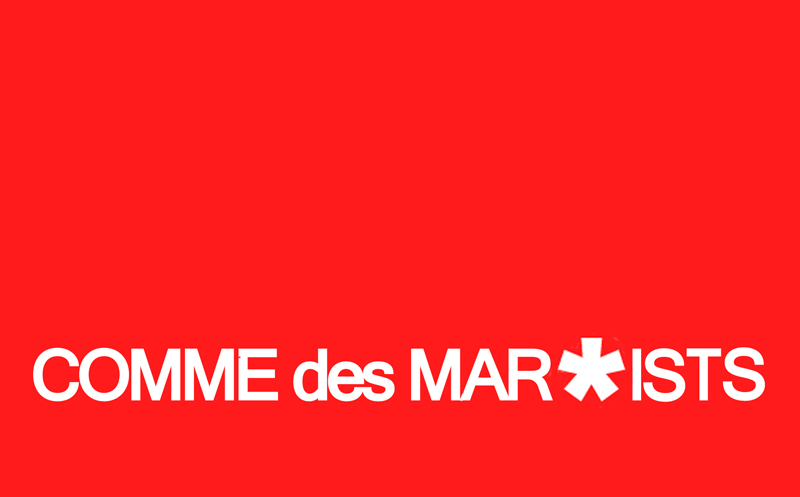
- Company type: Private
- Industry: Fashion
- Founded: 2013; 12 years ago
- Founder: Rainer Ganahl
- Headquarters: New York, New York
- Products: Clothing; Bags; Accessories
- Website: commedesmarxists.com

Comme des Marxists, stylized as COMME des MAR*ISTS, is an avant-garde fashion label founded by Austrian-born, New York-based designer Rainer Ganahl. The label's collections feature ready-to-wear garments, accessories, and jewelry, incorporating Marxist themes to critique capitalist structures. Signature pieces include slogan-emblazoned t-shirts, hybrid garments, and politically symbolic accessories, often integrating multilingual elements to reflect Ganahl's view of fashion as a medium for cross-cultural dialogue. Comme des Marxists examines global inequalities by drawing parallels between historical conflicts, such as those of the industrial revolution, and modern tragedies like the 2013 Rana Plaza factory collapse in Bangladesh. Through this lens, the label critiques both fast fashion and luxury goods, highlighting their roles in perpetuating class divisions and exploitative labor practices.

The project blends art and fashion as political commentary, referencing figures such as Karl Marx and Edward Snowden, as well as movements like Occupy Wall Street. Ganahl employs irony and satire, particularly in the label's title, a play on the fashion house Comme des Garçons. This juxtaposition underscores the contradictions of creating fashion items that critique capitalism. Ganahl’s work is noted for its provocative and playful critiques of both the fashion industry and the broader global economic systems it mirrors.

== History ==
The project debuted at Performa 13 in New York City in 2013, where it was presented at White Columns. Curated by Matthew Higgs, the presentation featured models showcasing garments that incorporated Marxist symbols and slogans, prompting audiences to reflect on the relationship between fashion and political discourse.

In 2018, Ganahl staged a notable iteration of Comme des Marxists at the Prato Textile Museum in Italy. The exhibition blended fashion, activism, and the industrial heritage of Prato, a city renowned for its textile production and its complex relationship with Chinese migrant labor. Ganahl used the historical context of the museum to critique global capitalism, labor exploitation, and the environmental impact of the fashion industry. Models wore garments featuring Marxist symbols and slogans, highlighting the contradictions of modern fashion production and its reliance on unsustainable practices.

In November 2018, Manhattan Marxism was released, a 768-page volume compiling Ganahl’s diverse Comme des Marxists-inspired projects. The book highlights a range of fashion presentations such as Marx 4 Kids, Karl Marx Said..., Marx 99 Cents, Karl Marx Speaks Chinese, There Is Only One Karl, Marx Toxic, Devil's Dust, Marx Middle-Class Squeeze, Karl Marx Wears Prada, and Marx Sex Work.

In late 2018-2019, the Comme des Marxists exhibition was held at the Fashion Space Gallery in London. This exhibition explored Ganahl’s ongoing investigations into the relationships between daily life, culture, and economic systems. Curated by Camilla Palestra, it was part of the University of the Arts London Centre for Sustainable Fashion's 10th anniversary celebrations.

On July 11, 2019, Rainer Ganahl presented his fashion show Please, Teach Me Chinese / Please, Teach Me Italian — Marx a Prato / Gucci a Prato at MX Gallery in New York. The show revisited Ganahl's earlier project in Prato, Italy, and explored themes of labor, race, and the global fashion industry.
