= Mary Augusta Scott =

American scholar and English professor

- Born: 1851; Dayton, Ohio
- Died: 1918 (aged 66–67)
- Education: Yale University
- Occupation: Scholar

Mary Augusta Scott (1851–1918) was a scholar and professor of English at Smith College. She was one of the first women to receive a PhD from Yale University, in 1894.

== Biography ==
Scott was born in Dayton, Ohio, and received her master's degree at Vassar College. She studied at Newnham College, University of Cambridge, Johns Hopkins University, and Yale University; she earned her Ph.D. from Yale in 1894.

A professor of English at Smith College from 1902, Scott edited and published The Essays of Francis Bacon. In the same year, she became the first woman to serve on the Dante Society of America's executive council. She also completed Elizabethan Translations from the Italian, published in the Vassar Semi-Centennial Series in 1916, and reviewed by the Journal of Modern Philology in 1918. She was a frequent contributor to The Dial and other literary and academic journals.

== Death and legacy ==
Scott died in 1918. The Mary Augusta Scott Papers, ca. 1870 - 1917, are held at Vassar College Archives and Special Collections.

In 2016, a portrait of the first seven women to receive Ph.D.s from Yale, which those seven women all did in 1894, was placed in Sterling Memorial Library at Yale. The women include Scott, Elizabeth Deering Hanscom, Margaretta Palmer, Charlotte Fitch Roberts, Cornelia H.B. Rogers, Sara Bulkley Rogers, and Laura Johnson Wylie. The portrait is the first painting hanging in Sterling Memorial Library to have women as subjects. Brenda Zlamany was the artist.

== Works ==
- The Essays of Francis Bacon (editor) (New York, 1908)
- Elizabethan translations from the Italian (1916)
