= Performance Research =

- Discipline: Performing arts
- Language: English
- Edited by: Ric Allsopp; Richard Gough

Publication details
- History: 1996–present
- Publisher: Taylor and Francis
- Frequency: Bimonthly

Standard abbreviations
- ISO 4: Perform. Res.

Indexing
- ISSN: 1352-8165 (print); 1469-9990 (web)

Links
- Journal homepage; Online access; Online archive

Performance Research is a specialist performance art journal published bi-monthly (from 2012).

It is an independent, peer-reviewed journal published by Routledge Journals, Taylor & Francis Ltd for ARC, a division of the Centre for Performance Research Ltd, an educational charity limited by guarantee. It is based at the Academy of Music and Theatre Arts at Falmouth University.

Performance Research was founded in 1995 by Ric Allsopp, Richard Gough and Claire MacDonald.

== Performance Research Books ==
Performance Research Books is an independent venture of Performance Research journal and an imprint of ARC, a division of the Centre for Performance Research Ltd.

Performance Research Books follows and expands the policy of the journal, but opens into publishing monographs, bookworks, and singular works on distinctive practice.

Publications include:

- Good Luck Everybody: Lone Twin - Journeys, Performances, Conversations, 2011 (eds. Carl Lavery and David Williams) ISBN 978 1 906499 02 0
- We're People Who Do Shows: Back to Back Theatre - Performance, Politics, Visibility, 2013 (eds. Helena Grehan and Peter Eckersall) ISBN 978 1 906499 03 7
- Worlds, Bodies, Matters: Theatre of the Late Twentieth Century by Valentina Valentini, 2014 (trans. Thomas Haskell Simpson) ISBN 978 1 906499 04 4

Projects in process include: BADco (Croatia), Ong Keng Sen/TheatreWorks (Singapore), Alicia Rios (Spain).
