= Rainer Ganahl =

Austrian-American artist (born 1961)

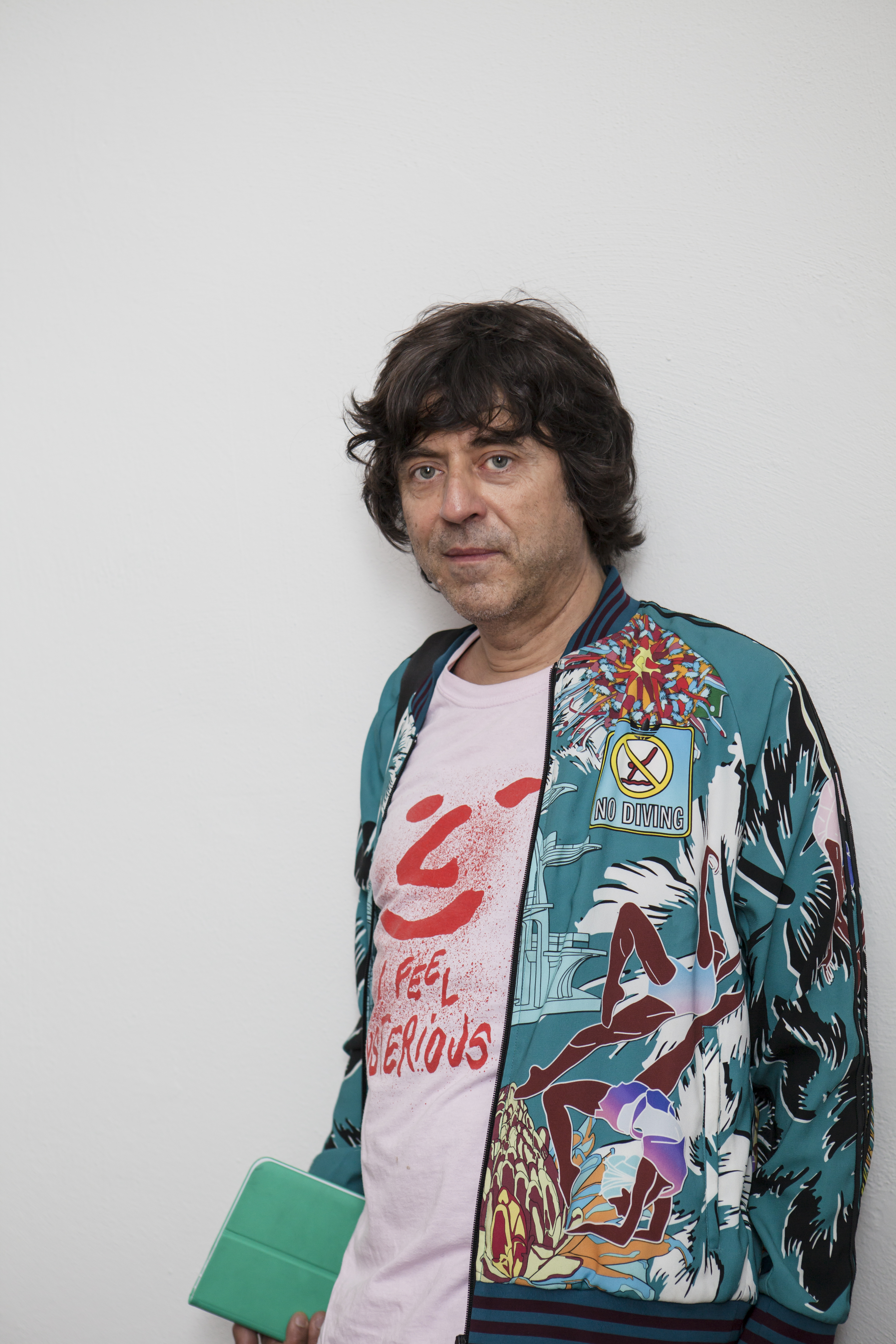
- Ganahl in 2015
- Born: Bludenz, Austria
- Known for: Manhattan Marxism
- Movement: Romanticism
- Website: www.ganahl.info

Rainer Ganahl (born 18 October 1961) is an Austrian-American conceptual artist who lives and works in New York. His work has been widely exhibited, including the Kunsthaus Bregenz, Austria; The Wallach Art Gallery, Columbia University, New York; the Gesellschaft für Aktuelle Kunst, Bremen, Germany; and the 48th Venice Biennale. He is the subject and author of several published catalogues, among them, Reading Karl Marx (London: Book Works, 2001), Ortsprache—Local Language (Kunsthaus Bregenz, 1998), and Rainer Ganahl: Educational Complex (Vienna: Generali Foundation, 1997).

== Education ==
Ganahl received a Master’s degree in Philosophy, History, and Social Sciences from the University of Innsbruck in 1985, with a focus on Ludwig Wittgenstein, linguistics, the history of economics, technology, and communication, as well as aesthetics shaped by the transformation of media across centuries.

Ganahl is an autodidact and has made learning a lifelong practice—an ethos that has itself become central to his artistic output. This dedication was on display at the Italian Pavilion of the Venice Biennale curated by Robert Storr, where his project "Basic Linguistics" was featured.

From 1986 to 1990, Ganahl pursued undergraduate studies at the University of Applied Arts Vienna (commonly known as die Angewandte), earning a Bachelor of Fine Arts (BFA) in 1990. There, he studied under Peter Weibel (associated with Viennese Actionism) and was influenced by cybernetics and network theory through Roy Ascott. He also engaged with visiting lecturers such as Valie Export, and prominent professors including Hans Hollein, a central figure in postmodern architecture, and Maria Lassnig. The university—renowned for its ties to Jugendstil and historic associations with Gustav Klimt, Oskar Kokoschka, and Egon Schiele—was, during Ganahl’s time, also linked to contemporary cultural figures such as Vivienne Westwood.

From 1990 to 1991, Ganahl continued his studies at the Kunstakademie Düsseldorf, where he studied under Nam June Paik and earned a Master of Fine Arts (MFA) in 1991. Concurrently, during the 1990/91 academic year, he was a participant in the Independent Study Program at the Whitney Museum of American Art in New York City.

He is fluent in German, Italian, French, Spanish, Russian, Japanese, and Chinese, with the ability to read and write in each language.

== Work ==
Ganahl started his career exploring computer based art, a pioneering field for its time. His first exhibition in this area was demonstrated at Philomene Magers in 1990.

His best known work, S/L (Seminars/Lectures), is an ongoing series of photographs, begun in 1995, of well-known cultural critics addressing audiences. The photographs, taken in university class rooms and lecture halls, not only show the lecturer but also the listeners and students in the audience. In a similar way, he documented his own process of learning an "exotic" language (e. g., Basic Japanese) into an art project.

In his Imported-Reading Seminars held from 1995 onward, the group study of theoretical works from specific countries were documented on video. His exhibition "El Mundo" at Kai Matsumiya was recently listed as one of the top exhibitions of 2014 by the New York Times, and the film was subsequently acquired in the permanent collections at the Whitney Museum of American Art and the Hirshhorn Collection at the Smithsonian.

Besides his photographic work and media art, Ganahl has been painting throughout his career, often integrating current news coverage into his pictures.

Ganahl represented Austria at the 48th Venice Biennale.

In 2013, Ganahl founded the fashion brand Comme des Marxists, which merges fashion, art, and Marxist theory. The brand critiques capitalism and explores class struggles, cultural commentary, and sustainability in the fashion industry. The brand has been exhibited in numerous international galleries and museums, contributing to dialogues on capitalism and sustainability in both fashion and art.

== Bibliography ==
- Rainer Ganahl, DISASTER CAPITALISM - Paintings and Fashion, Independently published, New York, 2024. ISBN 979-8334700307
- Rainer Ganahl, Manhattan Marxism, Published by Sternberg Press, Berlin, 2018. ISBN 978-3-95679-411-7
- Rainer Ganahl, Ubu Trump: A tragi-comic play, 2018. ISBN 978-1986003353
- Hartle, Johan F., and Rainer Ganahl. DadaLenin. Stuttgart: Edition Taube, 2013. ISBN 9783981451849
- Rainer Ganahl: Use a bicycle, Rainer Ganahl, Der Lehrling in der Sonne. The Apprentice in the Sun, L'apprenti dans le soleil, 2007. Revolver Verlag, Frankfurt, Kunstmuseum Stuttgart. ISBN 978-3-86588-386-5
- Rainer Ganahl: MONEY AND DREAMS: COUNTING THE LAST DAYS OF THE SIGMUND FREUD BANKNOTE. Putnam, CT: Spring Publications, 2005. ISBN 0-88214-565-7
- Rainer Ganahl, Road to War, Published by MUMOK (Museum of Modern Art Vienna), and Verlag der Buchhandlung Walther König, Cologne. 240 pages, 2005. ISBN 3-88375-959-7
- William Kaizen, "Please, teach me" - Rainer Ganahl and the Politics of Learning, 2005
- Rainer Ganahl, NEXT TARGET - Versteinerte Politik / Petrified Politics, 2004. Published by GAK (Gesellschaft für Aktuelle Kunst, Bremen), and Revolver, Frankfurt. ISBN 3-86588-039-8
- Rainer Ganahl, lueneburger-heide-sprechen, revolver, Frankfurt 2003. ISBN 3-934823-56-4
- Rainer Ganahl, Reading Karl Marx, Book Works, London, 2001. ISBN 1-870699-57-2
- Rainer Ganahl (ed), IMPORTED - A Reading Seminar, Semiotext(e), New York 1998. ISBN 1-57027-076-7
