= Agnieszka Kurant =

Polish interdisciplinary conceptual artist

- Born: 1978 (age 47–48); Łódź, Poland
- Education: University of Łódź, Goldsmiths College

Agnieszka Kurant (born 1978) is a Polish interdisciplinary conceptual artist. She examines how economic, social, and cultural systems work in ways that blur the lines between reality and fiction.

== Biography ==
Kurant was born in 1978 in Łódź, Poland. She is of Jewish heritage, although was raised Catholic. Kurant only found out that her mother was Jewish and that her grandparents were Holocaust survivors when she was a teenager. She studied at the University of Łódź and holds an MA in Curating from Goldsmiths College in London. Kurant is particularly interested in “the economy of the invisible,” which she explores in her work by creating imaginary locations, information systems, facts, and realities.

Her work has been exhibited widely, including the Venice Biennale 12th International Architecture Exhibition, and is in the permanent collection of the Solomon R. Guggenheim Museum. Her work has been reviewed in major publications such as The New York Times, Art in America, frieze and Artforum, where she also has been featured as a contributing writer. She is represented by Tanya Bonakdar Gallery in New York, where she lives and works.

In 2015, the Solomon R. Guggenheim Museum commissioned her work The End of Signature to be projected onto the outside facade of the building and accessioned it to be part of the museum's permanent collection. Her first solo exhibition in the United States, exformation, was featured at SculptureCenter in 2013 and she had a solo exhibition at the Center for Contemporary Art, Tel Aviv in 2017. In 2010, Kurant represented Poland (along with the architect Aleksandra Wasilkowska) with the presentation Emergency Exit at the Venice Biennale 12th International Architecture Exhibition. Kurant was the 2017 visiting artist at MIT.

In 2020, Kurant was a recipient of 2020 Art + Technology Lab grant from the Los Angeles County Museum of Art.

== Exhibitions ==
=== Solo exhibitions ===
- 2017: Assembly Line, The Center for Contemporary Art, Tel Aviv
- 2017–2018: Collective Intelligence, SCAD Museum of Art, Savannah
- 2025: Collective Intelligence, Marian Goodman Gallery, New York

=== Group exhibitions ===
- 2019:16th Istanbul Biennial
- 2019: XXII Milan Triennial, Broken Nature: Design Takes on Human Survival
- 2020–2021: Broken Nature, MoMA, New York
- 2020–2021: Uncanny Valley: Being Human in the Age of AI, De Young Museum, San Francisco
