= Breath (play) =

Short stage play by Samuel Beckett

- Written by: Samuel Beckett
- Characters: none
- Date premiered: 16 June 1969
- Place premiered: Eden Theatre, New York City

Breath is an unusually short dramaticule stage work by Samuel Beckett. An altered version was first included in Kenneth Tynan's revue Oh! Calcutta!, at the Eden Theatre in New York City on 16 June 1969. The UK premiere was at the Close Theatre Club in Glasgow in October 1969; this was the first performance of the text as written. The second performance, and the English premiere, was at a benefit held at the Oxford Playhouse on March 8, 1970. "The first accurate publication appeared in Gambit 4.16 (1969): 5–9, with a manuscript facsimile."

== Synopsis ==
Even for Beckett, whose later plays are often extremely short, Breath is an unusually brief work. Its length can be estimated from Beckett's detailed instructions in the script to be about 35 seconds. It consists of the sound of "an instant of recorded vagitus" (a birth-cry), followed by an amplified recording of somebody slowly inhaling and exhaling accompanied by an increase and decrease in the intensity of the light. There is then a second identical cry, and the piece ends. No people are seen on stage, but Beckett states that it should be "littered with miscellaneous rubbish." He did specify however that there were to be "no verticals", the rubbish was to be "all scattered and lying."

== History ==
Tynan, who was the Literary Manager at the National Theatre in London and was devising Oh! Calcutta!, had asked Beckett "... to write a brief skit for an erotic review, and Beckett agreed when he heard that Edna O'Brien, Jules Feiffer, Leonard Melfi, John Lennon and Tynan himself were planning to contribute. All the contributions were to be listed anonymously on the programme so that none of the contributors would be identified with his writing."

Beckett sent the text of the play on a postcard to Tynan. At the first production, his staging was altered to make the work fit in with the somewhat risque nature of the revue by adding naked bodies to the rubbish, suggesting that the work was about sexual intercourse. "In one of his few displays of public anger, Beckett called Tynan a 'liar' and a 'cheat', prompting Tynan to send a formal notice through his lawyers that he was not responsible for the travesty, which he claimed was due to others ... Beckett decided the incident wasn't worth the argument and dropped it."

"John Calder claims that Tynan commissioned it; but Ruby Cohn disputes this, saying that Samuel Beckett had recited it to her years before, and that Calder published a fair copy but not the original, which SB had written on the paper tablecloth of a café."

James Knowlson quotes Beckett describing this play in the context of Oh! Calcutta!:

"My contribution to the Tynan circus is a forty second piece entitled BREATH … It is simply light coming up and going down on a stage littered with miscellaneous unidentifiable muck, sychronised with sound of breath, once in and out, the whole (ha!) begun and ended by the same tiny vagitus-rattle. I realized when too late to repent that it is not unconnected with

On entre, on crie
Et c'est la vie.
On crie, on sort,
Et c'est la mort.

If this fails to titillate I hand in my aprob."

It is evident from that last remark that Beckett meant his play to stand as an ironic comment on Oh! Calcutta! But someone tampered with the text, and added a stage direction to include naked people to the miscellaneous rubbish. When the book of Oh! Calcutta! was published by Grove Press, not only was this unauthorised addition added, but Beckett's name was the only author listed and attached to one of the pieces, despite the agreement that the authors would be anonymous. On top of that, the photograph on the page that faced Beckett's script showed the naked bodies.

=== A filmed version ===
In the filmed version directed by artist Damien Hirst featuring actor Keith Allen (doing the sound effect described as "Vagitus Aspiration") as part of the Beckett on Film project "the debris features hospital and medical waste" as well as cigarette butts shaped to form swastikas. Hirst says: "When I was asked to direct this film, I read the text and thought it was incredibly precise and strict. While preparing to shoot, I kept reading the text over and over and what focused me was Beckett’s direction 'hold for about 5 seconds'. That was when I realised that Beckett had this massive sense of humour."
