= Ryan Wallace (artist) =

American multi-media artist (born 1977)

- Born: 1977 (age 48–49); New York, New York, U.S.
- Education: Rhode Island School of Design
- Known for: Painting, works on paper, installation art, and sculpture
- Awards: Elaine de Kooning House Artist in Residence, Joan Mitchell Foundation Grant Nominee, Pollock Krasner Foundation Grant Awardee, Robert Blackburn Printmaking Workshop, SIP Fellowship, Elizabeth Foundation for the Arts, New York, NY

Ryan Wallace (born 1977 in New York City) is an American multi-media artist based in Brooklyn and East Hampton, New York.

== Early life and education ==
Wallace was born in New York City. He received a Bachelor of Fine Arts degree from Rhode Island School of Design in 1999.

== Career and work ==
Wallace uses a variety of media and materials in his works, some of which include: oil paint, enamel, acrylic paint, pigment, cold wax, canvas, linen, rubber, aluminum, and fiberglass. In a feature on Wallace for The East Hampton Star, Jennifer Landes wrote, "His paintings are amalgamations. . . He has an indirect way of including painting in the work. He might place found material, such as dropcloths or old curtains from his house, on the floor of his studio to collect drops and splatters from work in progress on the wall, or find other ways of introducing it."

Wallace has participated in group exhibitions at institutions such as the Yerba Buena Center for the Arts, San Francisco; Institute of Contemporary Art at Maine College of Art, Portland; Artists Space, New York; and, V1 Gallery, Copenhagen. His work can be found in the public collections of the Rhode Island School of Design Museum, Providence; Museum of Modern Art, New York; San Francisco Museum of Modern Art; Museum of Contemporary Art, San Diego; Schwartz Collection, Harvard Business School, Cambridge; and, The Watermill Center, Watermill, among others.
