= Constance DeJong (visual artist) =

American visual artist (born 1950)

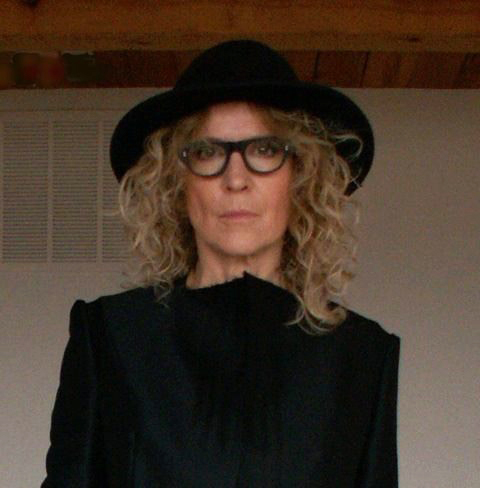
Constance DeJong

Constance DeJong (born 1950) is an American visual artist who works in the margin between sculpture and painting/drawing. Her predominate medium is metal with light as a dominant factor. She is currently working in New Mexico and is a professor of sculpture at the University of New Mexico. DeJong received a National Endowment for the Arts Visual Art Fellowship in 1982. In 2003, she had a retrospective at the Albuquerque Museum of Art and History. That same year, Constance DeJong: Metal was published and released by University of New Mexico Press. Her work has been described by American art critic Dave Hickey as "work worth seeing and thinking about under any circumstances".

== Collections ==
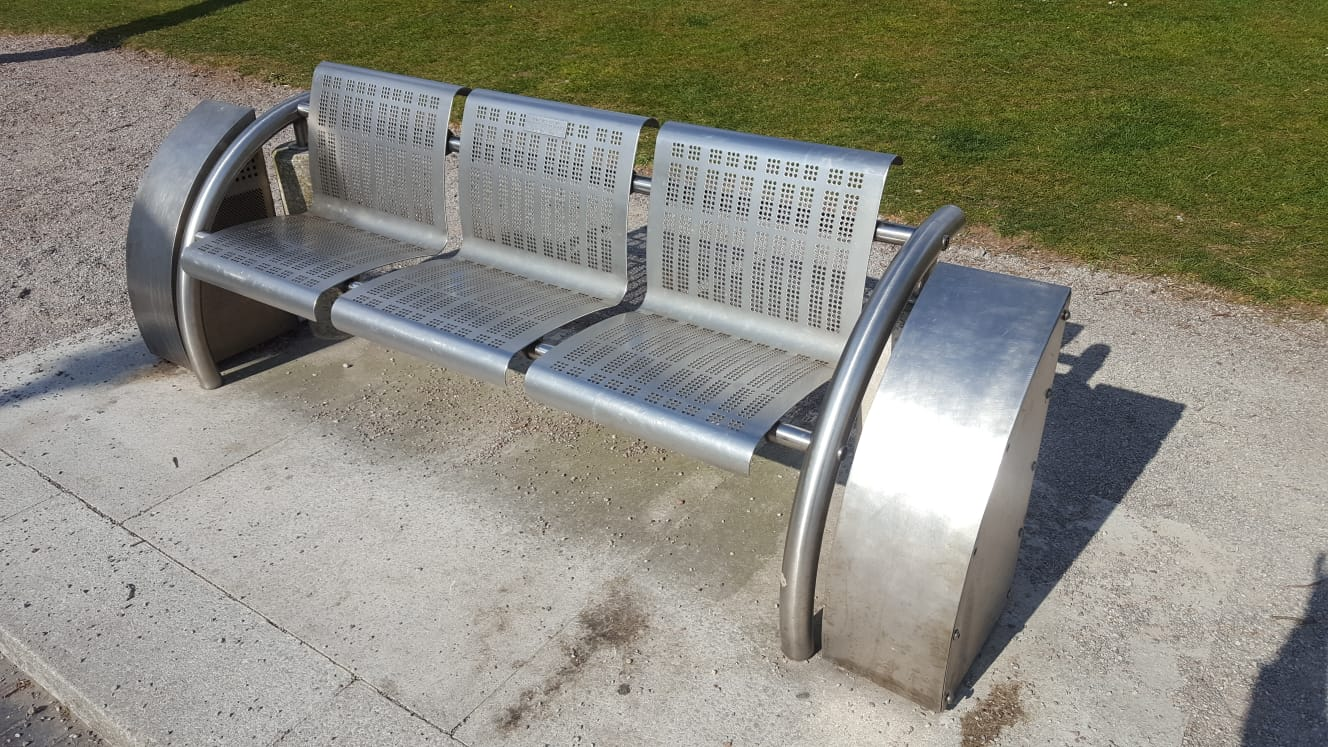
Constance De Jong: Speaking of the River (2000). Audio. Canary Wharf, London

Works by Constance DeJong can be found in the Albuquerque Museum of Art and History, New Mexico; the New Mexico Museum of Art, New Mexico; The Albright-Knox Art Gallery, Buffalo, New York; the Fisher Landau Center for Art, Long Island City, New York, the Scottsdale Museum of Contemporary Art, and the Clay Center for Arts and Sciences, Charleston, West Virginia.

== Museum exhibitions ==
- 1980: American Crafts Museum, NYC, Young Americans: Metal Catalog (group)
- 1982: Sweeney Center, Santa Fe, New Mexico, New Mexico In Three Dimensions catalog (group) Traveling to: Sheldon Memorial Art Gallery, University of Nebraska, Lincoln; Spiva Art Center, Joplin, Montana; Sioux City Arts Center, Iowa;Abilene Fine Arts Museum, Texas; Tyler Art Museum, Houston, Texas
- 1984: Roswell Museum and Art Center, New Mexico, 1984 Invitational Exhibition Catalog, (group)
- 1985: Fox Fine Arts Center, University of Texas, El Paso, Five From New Mexico (group)
- 1987: Museum of Fine Arts, Santa Fe, New Mexico, New Mexico '87 Catalog, (group)
- 1989: University of New Mexico Art Museum, Jonson Gallery, Albuquerque, Constance DeJong 1989, catalog (solo)
- 1991: Mulvane Art Museum, Washburn University, Topeka, Kansas, The Plane Truth Catalog (3 person) Museum of Fine Arts, Museum of New Mexico, Santa Fe, Singular Visions Catalog, (group)
- University of New Mexico Art Museum, Jonson Gallery, Albuquerque, Abstract Art Catalog, (group)
- 1993: University Art Museum, University of New Mexico, Albuquerque, Art Of This Century, Catalog, (group)
- 1995: Albuquerque Museum, New Mexico, Common Ground 95 (group)
- 1996: Museum of Fine Arts, Museum of New Mexico, Santa Fe, Curatorial Collections; Acquisitions To The Historic, Contemporary, And Photographic Collections (group)
- SITE Santa Fe, New Mexico, Contemporary New Mexico Artists: Sketches And Schemas Book (group) Traveling to Sheldon Memorial Art Gallery, University of Nebraska, Lincoln
- 1998: Cedar Rapids Museum of Art, Iowa, Albuquerque, Santa Fe, Taos, Catalog, (group)
- 1999: University Art Museum, University of New Mexico, Albuquerque, The Minimalist Tradition in New Mexico, Catalog, (group)
- 2001: Museum of Fine Arts, Museum of New Mexico, Santa Fe, Organizing The World: Sculptural Interventions (group)
- 2003: Albuquerque Museum, New Mexico, Constance DeJong: Sculpture and Drawings, a Retrospective 2003–2004 (retrospective)
- 2005: The Albright-Knox Art Gallery, Buffalo, New York, The Natalie and Irving Forman Collection, Catalog (group)
- Tucson Museum of Art, Arizona, Paint on Metal, catalog (group)
- 2006: Museum of Fine Arts, Museum of New Mexico, Santa Fe, Constellations (three person)
- 2008: The Albright-Knox Art Gallery, Buffalo, New York, Works on paper (group)
- 2010: Fisher Landau Center for Art, Long Island City, New York, Unforgettable (group)
- New Mexico Museum of Art, Santa Fe, New Mexico, Case Studies from the Bureau of Contemporary Art (group)
- 2011: The Albright-Knox Art Gallery, Buffalo, New York, The Long Curve Book,(group)
- 2012: Scottsdale Museum of Contemporary Art, Arizona, Economy of Means: Toward Humility in Contemporary Sculpture (group)
- The Albright-Knox Art Gallery, Buffalo, New York, DECADE:Contemporary Collecting 2002–2012 Book (group)
- New Mexico Museum of Art, Santa Fe, New Mexico, It’s About Time (group)
- 2013: New Mexico Museum of Art, Santa Fe, New Mexico, Collecting Is Curiosity/Inquiry (group)
- 2015: New Mexico Museum of Art, Hunting and Gathering, Santa Fe, (group)
- Albuquerque Museum, New Mexico, Visualizing Albuquerque (group)
- University Art Museum, University of New Mexico, Albuquerque, This Art is Not Mine (group)
- 2017 Scottsdale Museum of Contemporary Art, Arizona, The Kindness of Strangers: Recent Acquisitions and Conservation Projects (group)
