= Yann Toma =

French artist (born 1969)

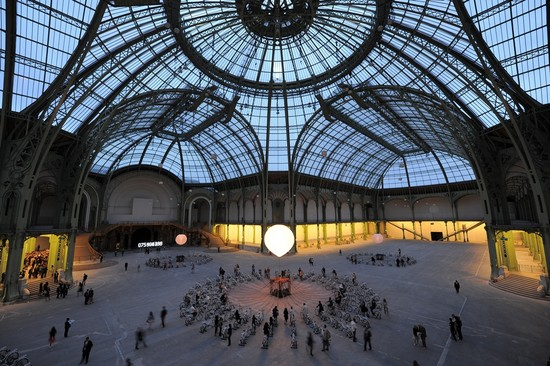
© Yann Toma, Dynamo Fukushima, Grand Palais, 2011

Yann Toma (born in 1969) in is an artist and a researcher, the lifelong president of the company Ouest-Lumière and an artist-observer within the UN, where he sits as an entrepreneurial artist. With projects always anchored in a societal context, Yann Toma's fundamental idea is to rebuild the link. Connecting with ourselves, our collective memory, and the transforming power generated by the mass, art is used here as a means of materializing energy flows but also as an energy in its own right.

Yann Toma is a French contemporary artist and a researcher. He positions his work and his reflection on the border of the artistic expression, always involved in political and social events. Toma places the artist as responsible for social debate. As a mediator he can invite people to get involved, to take part of a collaborative energy. Toma collaborates with entreprises, political scientists as well as philosophers. By salvaging material from former electric power company Ouest-Lumière in the early 1990s, he has appropriated a symbolic network, an industrial infrastructure which he turned into his research territory and the very matter of his activity. Toma, president for life of Ouest Lumière, is also an artist-observer within the U.N where he sits as an entrepreneurial artist.

== Artistic energy ==
Toma developed the concept of artistic energy. He appropriated a symbolic network, an infrastructure coming from factories of which he made his territory of research and the subject of his activity. "Ouest-Lumière" is above all about an immaterial network which the artist established patiently, a network of subterranean resistance resting on the notion of memory and report. His personal but collaborative exhibition Dynamo-Fukushima, exhibited at the Grand Palais for the Heritage Days of September 2011, attracted more than 17,000 people in two days. This focus on collective energy and solidarity, after the nuclear disaster of Fukushima in this case, is the tone of Toma's favorite topic.

== Career positions ==
The artist is also a PHD professor and a researcher in University of Paris 1 Pantheon-Sorbonne where he manages the team of research CNRS (French national center for scientific research), named " Art & Flux " which is as much a look-out post, an observatory of theoretical and critical research, as a laboratory of experiment and artistic production. Art & Flux (Art and Flows) reports in a critical way what connects the art, the economy and the society. He is the author of the collective work Les entreprises critiques (" The critical companies ") and of Artistes & Entreprises (Artists & Companies).

== Collections ==
The artistic work of Toma is part of numerous collections. His work is integrated in particular into the collection of Centre Georges Pompidou and was put in the inventory of the National Art Collection of Contemporary Art in 2007. He is represented by The Opening Gallery, in New York. A monography, entitled "Yann Toma" (texts, conversations, 700 photos and illustrations), went out to September 2011 which presents the extent of his work and artistic flux of the President for life of Ouest-Lumière. His personal participative exhibition in the Grand Palais Dynamo-Fukushima (in September 2011) gathered more than 17,000 visitors in two days. The French national memorial created for the centennial of the World War I is the last monumental artwork of the artist. At night, the monument called L'Anneau de la mémoire becomes La Grande Veilleuse ("The Great Wake Light") and the memory of 580,000 soldiers keeps shining when the visitors are gone.

== Artistic route ==
=== Personal exhibitions ===
1992, 1994

- Élaboration du Mémorial de l'Usine Ouest Lumière (Elaboration of the Memorial of the Factory Ouest Lumière), Espace EDF, Puteaux, France

1997

- L'Usine fantasmagorique, (The phantasmagorical Factory), Centers art and culture of the Farm of Buisson, Noisiel
- La vitrine de l'officine du docteur Bartok (The shop window of the pharmacy of doctor Bartok), Révillon d'Apreval Gallery, Paris, France
- Le cercle de la crypte (The circle of the crypt), Caves de l'AFAA, Ministry of Foreign and European Affairs (France), Paris, France
- Alchimie souterraine (Subterranean alchemy), Chez Eve Marie-Chauvin, Paris, France

1998

- Plovdiski noshti, Alliance Française (French alliance) of Bulgaria and Gallery Gamma, Plovdiv, Bulgaria

1999

- Ostension de Rose HEIM, 'La hune' Bookshop, Paris, France
- Les nuits de Plovdiv, Affaires culturelles de la Ville de Paris (Cultural affairs of the City of Paris), AFAA, Paris (Association Française d'Action Artistique – French association of Artistic Action)

2000

- Restes lumière, Galerie Valérie Cueto, Paris, France

2001

- Crimes sur commande (Crimes to order), Espace huit novembre, Paris, France

2002

- Contrôle qualité (Quality control), Patricia Dorfmann Galery, Paris, France
- Ouest-Lumière – Laboratoire de recherche (Research laboratory), Patricia Dorfmann Galery, Paris, France
- Début de transmission (At the beginning of transmission), Cité internationale universitaire de Paris, France

2003

- Procédure de Rappel (Procedure of Reminder), Bibliothèque Nationale de France, Paris, France
- BF15 AIRPORT, BF15, Lyon, France
- Ouverture de l'ABRI, Paris, France

2004

- "Ouest-Lumière", The Brewers, Liège, Belgium
- Traitement de faveur (Special treatment), La Blanchisserie, Boulogne, France

2005

- Ouest-Lumière 1905–2005, CCC, Tours
- Flux radiants et Transmission Annecy, (Radiant Flows and Transmission Annecy ), Castle museum, Annecy
- Ouest-Lumière, Center of art La Passerelle, Brest, France

2006

- Good vibrations, Alliance française of New Delhi, India
- Part de jouissance (Part of enjoyment), Patricia Dorfmann Galery, Paris, France

2007

- Part de jouissance 2 (Part of enjoyment 2), Centre d'art contemporain d'Épinal (Contemporary Arts Center of Épinal), Épinal, France

2008

- Ouest-Lumière la collection (31–05,31-08), Museum EDF Electropolis, Mulhouse, France

2009

- BANKROT, Bourouina Gallery, Berlin, 6th District, Germany
- Dynamo POST-BANKRUPT, Musée Zadkine, Paris, France
- BANKROT, Cultural French Ambassy, New York, United States
- CROSSING WAYS, UNO, New York, United States

2010

- Security Council, United Nations, New York City
- Geysir Ouest-Lumière, Royaumont Abbey, France

2011

- Dynamo-Fukushima, Grand Palais, Paris
- There was chemistry, Walls and bridges, French Embassy in the United States, New York City
- Security Council, Monumental work, La Villette, Paris – CO² Storage/Sculptures de CO², Hôtel Lutetia, FIAC, Paris, France
- General Assembly, UN, United Nations, New York – Incursiòn en la ONU, Bogotá, Colombia
- Wikileaks : Les câbles litigieux Ouest-Lumière (Wikileaks: The litigious cables Ouest-Lumière), Incognito Artclub, Paris, France
- Geysir Ouest-Lumière, Royaumont Abbey, France
- Transmission Karlsruhe, KAMUNA, Karlsruher Museumsnacht, Germany

2012

- L'Or Bleu (the blue gold), In association with Francis Kurkdjian, Le Bazacle, foundation EDF, Toulouse, France

2013

- TRANSvision, light work and video installation, main guest of Montrouge Biennale, Le Beffroi, Montrouge, France
- TRANScorp. light transmission, interactive and permanent artwork, La Briqueterie, Vitry-sur-Seine, France
- The Man in Gold, Alvin Alto Gallery, Helsinki, Finland

2014

- Observations on Secrecy, Surveillance and Censorship, drawings, "Logan Symposium", The Barbican Centre, London
- Climate March & General Assembly, engagement and civic investigation, New York, United States
- La Grande Veilleuse (The Great Wake Light), monumental work mixing light and architecture, in collaboration with the architecture agency AAPP. French national memorial of the World War I, Notre-Dame-de-Lorette, Ablain-Saint-Nazaire, France
- PLASMA, personal exhibition around the series "Les Restitutions". Bourouina Gallery, Berlin

2015

- Human Energy, monumental and participative installation, Eiffel Tower, Paris, France
- Climate Statements, portraits of States Chiefs drawn at the UN headquarters, Espace Krajcberg, Paris, France

2016

- Liberty Light, Eiffel Tower, Paris, New-York
- Flux Radiants : l'énergie que nous avons en nous, photographie, Peugeot Avenue, Beijing, China
- Drawings about Wikileaks, Variation Paris Media Artfair, during FIAC, Paris, France
- Sculptures, Société de Service, Plateforme, Paris, France
- Flux Radiants, Art of Change 21 à la COP22, Le Riad Yima, Marrakesh, Morocco
- Câbles Ouest-Lumière, in Sociétés de service, Plateforme, Paris, France
- Energetic Cover, photographie, Socialter, France
- YEW : Youth Energy Water, oeuvre monumenatale participative, La Manera de Marrakesh, Morocco
- Human Greenergy, oeuvre monumentale participative, Baitaisi White Dagoba Temple, Beijing Design Week, Beijing, China
- Human Lux, installation, Musée de l'Homme, IHEST Ministère de la Recherche, Paris, France
- Ouest-Lumière Papers Show, dessins/drawings, Incognito Art Club, Paris, France
- Signing Ceremony, drawings, General Assembly, United Nations, New York, United States
- Change Power, Portraits Logan Symposium, BCC, Berlin, Germany

2017

- The United Nations General Assembly, performances, New York, United States
- Flux radiants, photographies, Paris Photo, Banque Neuflize, Paris, France
- Tokyo Tour, série de performances, Tokyo, Japan
- The Artist in Residence for life at the UN, série d'interventions, New York, United States

2018

- Réactivation Ouest-Lumière, Espace Immanence, Paris, France

2019

- Transmission IV: Freedom for plants and the new pact for humanity, France-Romania Season, Institut Français, Timișoara, Romania
- Transmission III: listen to the secrets of the world, Saison France-Romania, Institut Français, Iași, Romania
- Brain Plants, Saison France-Roumanie, Institut Français, Victoria Gallery, Iași, Romania
- In situ work, Saison France-Roumanie, Institut Français, Central de Interes, Iași, Romania
- Transmission II : The one who speak to the plants, International Light Day, Saison France-Roumanie, Institut Français, Cluj-Napoca, Romania
- Transmission I : Words of love & wishes for the world, Institut Français, Bucharest, Romania

=== Collective exhibitions ===
1994

- Regard, Carottages en terre de l'Usine Ouest Lumière (Glance, Core drillings in earth of the Factory Ouest Lumière), Unesco, Paris, France

1995

- Chez l'un, Cercles d'ampoules (To the one, Encircle of bulbs), Anton Weller Gallery, Paris, France

1996

- La réserve des blancs manteaux (The reserve of the white coats), L'atelier parisien, Paris, France
- Chez l'un, Cabinet alchimique (To the one, Cabinet alchimique), Anton Weller Gallery, Paris – Biennale de Champigny, Mausolée de l'ouvrier inconnu (Mausoleum of the unknown worker), Champigny, France
- Monument et modernité (Monument and modernity), Espace Electra, Paris, France
- Chez l'un, Camera obscura (To the one, Camera obscura), Anton Weller Gallery, Paris, France

1997

- Réveillons-nous, Sous l'asphalte (Let us wake up, Under the asphalt), Anton Weller Gallery, Valentin, Météo, Paris, France
- Renvoi d'ascenseur – Opération Sztreminski (Cross-reference of elevator – Operation Sztreminski), Musée cinématographique de Łódź, Poland
- Le complot (The plot), institut Cochin de génétique moléculaire (Cochin institute of molecular genetics), Paris, France
- Empoussièrement du musée Napoléonien (Dustment of the Napoleonic museum), Ministry of Culture, Fontainebleau, France

1998

- Bruits secrets (Secret Rumours), Silicates de sodium (Silicates of sodium), CCC, Tours, France
- Ostension 1, EDF-ACT 91- City hall of La Norville, France

1999

- 9.0, Ostension du corps de Marianne Ripp (9.0, Ostension of Marianne Ripp's body), Web Bar, Paris, France
- Un lieu en travaux, Garage de soucoupes volantes (A place in works, Garage of spaceships), IUFM d'Étiolles, Étiolles – FIAC, Les Extases, Anton Weller Gallery, Paris, France
- Bateau Laboratoire, Paris vu du ciel (Boat Laboratory, Paris seen by the sky), Espace Bateau Lavoir, Paris, France
- Biennale des jeunes créateurs d'Europe et de la Méditerranée, Variation pour cinq housses (Biennial event of the young creators of Europe and the Mediterranean Sea, Variation for five covers), Rome, Italy
- Events, Crimes sur commande (Vents, Crimes to order), Yvon Lambert Gallery, Paris, France
- Work-shop, Variation pour quatre housses (Work-shop, Variation for four covers), Anton Weller Gallery, Paris, France
- Nécropolis, Ostension du corps de Laurent Claquin (Nécropolis, Ostension of Laurent Claquin's body), Georges-Philippe and Nathalie Vallois Gallery, Paris

2000

- aaa, archiving as art, Ouest-Lumière télémarketing, Isea, Paris, France
- Work shop, Images-flash, UFR 04, Paris, France
- Trafic de clones (Traffic of clones), Le cabinet M, Ivry
- L'art contemporain au risque du clonage (The contemporary art at the risk of the cloning), Le représentant, Vert le Petit
- Élémentaire, L'AFFAIRE de l'église St-Germain (Elementary, THE AFFAIR of the church St-Germain), Amiens
- L'incurable mémoire des corps, Le lieu de l'Incurable (Incurable memory of bodies, place of the Incurable), Ivry-sur-Seine
- Immanence, White houses, Infiltration, Paris – Argos project, Infiltration, Vevey, Switzerland
- Usine, ouvrier-ouvrière (Factory, male worker – female worker), Paris, France
- Lumière aux Cordeliers, Variation pour trente-six housses (Light to the Cordeliers, Variation for thirty six covers), Couvent des Cordeliers, Paris
- Sous l'asphalte (Under the asphalt Within the framework of the Parcours Saint Germain, Paris, France
- Promesses pour les années 2000 (Promises for 2000s), Ostension of the body of Stéphane Pianacci, CFDT, Paris, France
- Emplacement-déplacement IV, II ostension du corps de Marianne Ripp (Location – Travel IV, II ostension of Marianne Ripp's body), Anton Weller Gallery, Paris.
- Emplacement-Déplacement III, Ostension du corps de Nathalie F (Location – Travel IV, II ostension of Nathali F), Anton Weller Gallery, Paris, France

2001

- Quand l'art contemporain s'expose au débat public (When the contemporary art exposes itself to the public debate), Traversées, ARC Musée d'Art Moderne de la Ville de Paris (Museum of Modern Art of the City of Paris), Paris, France
- Facteur de troubles (Factor of disorders), Paris West University Nanterre La Défense, Nanterre (within the framework of the line of research for the CERAP "praxis et altérités", praxis and otherness)
- Effervescence, Contrôle qualité (Excitement, Quality control), Georges-Philippe and Nathalie Vallois Excitement, Quality control, Paris
- Personal light, Organismus, Kunsthauss, Hamburg, Germany – Dix poumons (Ten lungs), In association with Goran Vejvoda, MNAM Centre Georges Pompidou, Paris, France
- Jardin d'émotions (Garden of feelings), Specimen Ouest-Lumière, Musée Vera, Saint-Germain-en-Laye
- Immersion périscopique (Periscopic dumping), BATTERY SHOP, MACHINE SHOP, ELECTRICAL SHOP, Centre d'art de Soissons
- Situation, Dix séances au rayon violet (Situation, Ten sessions in the purple beam), Institut d'astrophysique, Paris, France
- Rouge, extase n°2 et l'AFFAIRE du boulevard de Reuilly (Red, ecstasy n°2 and the AFFAIR of the boulevard of Reuilly), Valérie Cueto Gallery, Paris, France

2002

- Sémaphore 1, Salon du patrimoine (Lounge of the holdings), Caroussel du Louvre, Paris, France
- Fête des lumières (Party of the lights), Transmission Pernon, Lyon
- Nuit blanche, Transmission Oberkampf, Paris – Flux radiants (Radiant Flows), La friche de la belle de mai (Astéride), Marseille
- Star 67, Ouest-Lumière production, Brooklyn, New York

2003

- Showroom #3 : Imposture légitime (Showroom 3: imposture legitimizes), Patricia Dorfmann Gallery, Paris
- Ma petite entreprise (My small firm), Centre d'art de Meymac (Center of art of Meymac), Meymac
- Crime de Nathalie F (Crime of Nathalie F), FIAC, Patricia Dorfmann Gallery, Paris, France
- Vies à vies (Lives to lives), Parcours Saint-Germain, Paris, France

2004

- Nu radiant (Radiant nude), FIAC, Patricia Dorfmann Galery, Paris, France
- Transmission Ivry, Exposition Polyptyque, Ivry sur Seine
- Nous assurons votre avenir énergétique, La rue aux artistes (We insure your energy future, The street to the artists), Viacom, 300 4/3 panels in all France
- Shelter Ouest-Lumière, Le Vent des forêts, forêt de Marcaulieu
- Affaire du museum Franz Gertsch (Affair of the museum Franz Gertsch), Kallmann Museum, Munich, Germany
- Chambre de contrôle (Chamber of control), Espace EDF Electra, Paris, France
- Douce France (Soft France), Culturgest, Lisbon, Portugal
- True Lies, Musée Franz Gertsch, Burgdorf, Switzerland

2005

- FIAC, Service des Armes de destruction massive – Destruction de 7000 magazines Technikart (FIAC, Department of Weapons of mass destruction – Destruction of 7000 magazines Technikart), Ouest-Lumière
- Neuf Crimes sur commandes (Nine Crimes on orders), Patricia Dorfmann Galery, Paris, France
- Chromoscaphe 1, Laboratoires du Musée du Louvre, Paris (within the framework of "Lumière-Couleur")
- Lancement du Radion (Launch of Radion), Art A3, Paris, France
- Pit of the company Ouest-Lumière, Centre des Jeunes Dirigeants, Paris, France
- Crimes sur commande, Face à Faces, AFAA, Artcurial, Paris, France

2006

- Walls of Neemrana, École des Beaux arts, Rouen, France
- Soucoupe volante (Spaceship), Les Peintres de la vie moderne (The Painters of the modern life), Georges Pompidou Center, Donation Collection photographique de la Caisse des Dépôts (Donation photographic Collection of the Deposit office)
- Face to Faces, AFAA, Stockholm, Sweden
- État du monde (State of the world), Espace III, Toulouse
- Face to Faces, AFAA, Edinburgh, Scotland
- Face to Faces, AFAA, Reykjavík, Iceland
- Dormir, rêver ... et autres nuits (Sleep, dream and the other nights), CAPC, Bordeaux
- Face à Faces, AFAA, Maison Rouge, Paris, France

2007

- Inondazione, Luce di Pietra, Palais Farnèse, Ambassade de France (Embassy of France), Rome, Italy

2008

- L'argent, Ouest-Lumière Stock Exchange (Money, Ouest-Lumière Stock Exchange', 18–06,17-08), Le plateau, Paris (curator: Elisabeth Lebovici)
- Biennale di Alessandria "Shapes of time" (29–05,31-08), Alessandria, Italy
- MONEY, (29–03,30-05), Sino Company, Düsseldorf, Germany (curator: Reinhard Spieler)
- Whats'up 2009 (14–06,2-08-08), Bourouina Gallery, Berlin
- Art Paris 2008, Patricia Dorfmann Galery, Grands Palais, Paris, France

2009

- The wealth of nations, Patricia Dorfmann Galery, Paris, France
- Flux, Paris Photo, Patricia Dorfmann Galery, Paris, France
- GENIPULATION, Centre Pasquart, Biel/Bienne, Switzerland
- Face to face, Musée de la photographie, Thessaloniki, Greece
- Geysir, Musée National d'art contemporain (National museum of contemporary art), Thessaloniki, Greece
- Weak signals / Wild cards, Tentoonstelling, Amsterdam, Netherlands
- Princess Frog, Jozsa Gallery, Brussels, Belgium
- Art Brussels International Art Fair, Bourouina Gallery, Belgium
- JOIN US, BVA & YT, the Armory Show, New York
- Wealth of nations, Patricia Dorfmann Galery, Paris, France

2010

- Hypothèses Vérification, Laboratoire art & science (Hypotheses Check, Laboratory art and science), Moscow, Russia
- Ouest-Lumière CO_{2} Storage, Le pire n'est jamais certain (The worst is never certain), Chapelle des Templiers, Metz, France

2011

- Art & Bicyclette (Art and Bicycle), Espace d'art concret (Space of concrete art), commissariat Paul Ardenne Fabienne Fulchéri, Mouans-Sartoux
- Genius Loci, Hôtel Fonfreyde, Centre photographique (Photographic center), commissariat Garance Chabert, Clermont-Ferrand
- Art et argent (Art and money), liaisons dangereuses (dangerous connections), Musée de la Monnaie de Paris (Museum of the Currency of Paris), Paris
- Lumière Noire (Black light), Staatliche Kunsthalle Karlsruhe, kurator Alexander Eiling, Germany
- Rupture mon amour (Break my love), Maison des Arts de Malakoff, commissariat de Aude Cartier, France – Lumière Noire (Black light), Staatliche Kunsthalle Karlsruhe, Germany
- Monumental, Musée de Belfort
- Rupture mon amour, La Maison des Arts, Malakoff

2013

- Somaflux, "D-light, 3ème édition", Happen Space Accenture, Paris, France
- World Energizing, art fair Show Off, Espace Cardin, Paris, France
- "Æsthetic Transactions" with Carsten Höller, Tatiana Trouvé, ORLAN. Michel Journiac Gallery, Paris (curator: Richard Shusterman)
- CO_{2} Storage, Art Paris Art Fair, Bourouina Gallery. Grand Palais, Paris, France
- Flux Radiants, "Brincar com a Luz", Rio, Brazil
- Occupy Laguardia, "Figures du sommeil", Jean Collet Gallery, Vitry-sur-Seine, France
- Cabine à flux 1,2 et 3 en collaboration avec Mathieu Lehanneur, JWT/Maison Cailler/ Nestlé, at Broc, Genève then Zurich, Suisse

2014

- Les Restitutions, art fair Show Off Variation, Espace des blancs manteaux, Paris, France
- Sculptures Wikileaks, "Absurde, vous avez dit absurde?", Les Filles du Calvaire Gallery, Paris, France
- Walls of Neemrana/ Dynamo-Fukushima, "Ensemble", De facto La Gallery, Paris (curator : Paul Ardenne)
- Video installation Dynamo-Fukushima, "Velodream, Art & Bike", Wroclaw, Poland
- Ouest-Lumière, "Business Model, Entreprises d'Artiste", La Vitrine AM, Paris, France
- Sidération du Général André Bach, "Fusillés pour l'exemple – Les fantômes de la République", Hôtel de ville, Paris, France

2015

- Statements, portraits of States Chiefs drawn at the UN headquarters, Drawing Now Paris, Carreau du Temple, Paris, France
- Human Dynamo/ CO_{2} storage/ Les Restitutions, "Post-Carbone", headquarter of La Poste Group, Paris, France

2016

- Drawings about Wikileaks, Variation, Artfair, during FIAC, France
- Sculptures, Société de Service, Plateforme, Paris, France

2018

- Ex Voto, Sourcil du Président à vie de Ouest-Lumière, in Rikiki 2, Galerie Satellite, Paris, France
- Ouest-Lumière, in 20 years of the EDF Foundation, Espace EDF Electra, Paris, France
- COLLECTION DAVID H. BROLLIET, GENEVA, Fondation Fernet-Branca, Art Basel, Saint-Louis, France
- White Card, Festival MAD (Multiple Art Days), Editions Baudouin Jannink, Hôtel de la monnaie, Paris, France
- Holistic Schemas, UFO Festival, Nice, France
- Lacry-Mots, in Christmas Project, Immanence/New Immanence, Paris, France

2019

- Morse transmission, Cluj Never Sleep Festival, Cluj-Napoca, Romania
- "Tropical/exotic gardens, Workshop "Art, gardens, scenography, and sustainable development", Panthéon Sorbonne, Palermo, Italy

2023

- Calendar Kopice | Restitutions | 2024 (cooperation with the KOPICE.PL group and the parish in Kopice)

== Prizes and awards ==
- 2022 : Knight of the Order of the French Legion of Honor.
- 2019 : Prize of the "Transitioner of the Year", Fondation des transitions, France.
- 2014 : Medal of honor from the city of Montrouge
- 2004 : FIACRE DAP, France
- 2002 : Prize of the social Artwork of the year, APC, city of Lyon
- 1997 : AFAA/Mairie de Paris, City hall of Paris
- 1995 : Fondation EDF

== Publications ==
=== Books by Yann Toma ===
- Yann Toma, Monograph (in several languages), under the direction of Yann Toma, Foreword Édouard Glissant, 10 authors, Éditions Jannink (publisher), Paris, ISBN 978-2-916067-28-5, 672 illustrations, 2011.
- Les entreprises critiques/Critical companies, bilingual, Cité du design Éditions/CERAP Éditions-Publishing, Saint-Étienne, France ISBN 978-2-912808-14-1, 2008
- Ouest-Lumière – La Collection, Éditions Jannink (publisher), Paris, ISBN 978-2-916067-31-5, 2008
- Part de jouissance (Part of enjoyment), Éditions Jannink, Paris, 2007
- Abri mode d'emploi (Shelter instructions for use), Michel Baverey Éditions (publisher), Paris, 2003
- Plovdiski Noschti, AFAA, Victoires Éditions (publisher), Paris, 1999
- Crimes sur commande (Crimes to order), Victoires Éditions (publisher), Paris, 1998
- In association with Richard Conte and M. Tabeaud, L’Usine dans l’espace francilien (The Factory in the space inhabitant of Ile-de-France), la Sorbonne publishing, 2001
- Supervised by Yann Toma, La Cheminée phosphorescente (The phosphorescent Fireplace), Victoires publishing, 2000

=== Books about Yann Toma ===
- Yann Toma, Monography (several languages), Supervised by Yann Toma, Foreword Édouard Glissant, 10 authors, Éditions Jannink, Paris, ISBN 978-2-916067-28-5, 672 pages, illustrations, 2011.
- Yann Toma, Journal-affiche numéro 1 (Yann Toma, Newspaper-poster number 1), François Noudelmann, Monography in English / French, Editions Jannink, Paris, ISBN 2-916067-42-6, 2009.
- Ouest-Lumière, Paul Ardenne, Isthme Éditions (publisher), FIACRE DAP, 128p, Paris, 2004.
- La cheminée phosphorescente (The phosphorescent Fireplace), S. Wright, V. Da Costa, C. Bayle, Victoires Éditions, 64p, Paris, 2000.
