= D. Graham Burnett =

American historian of science and writer

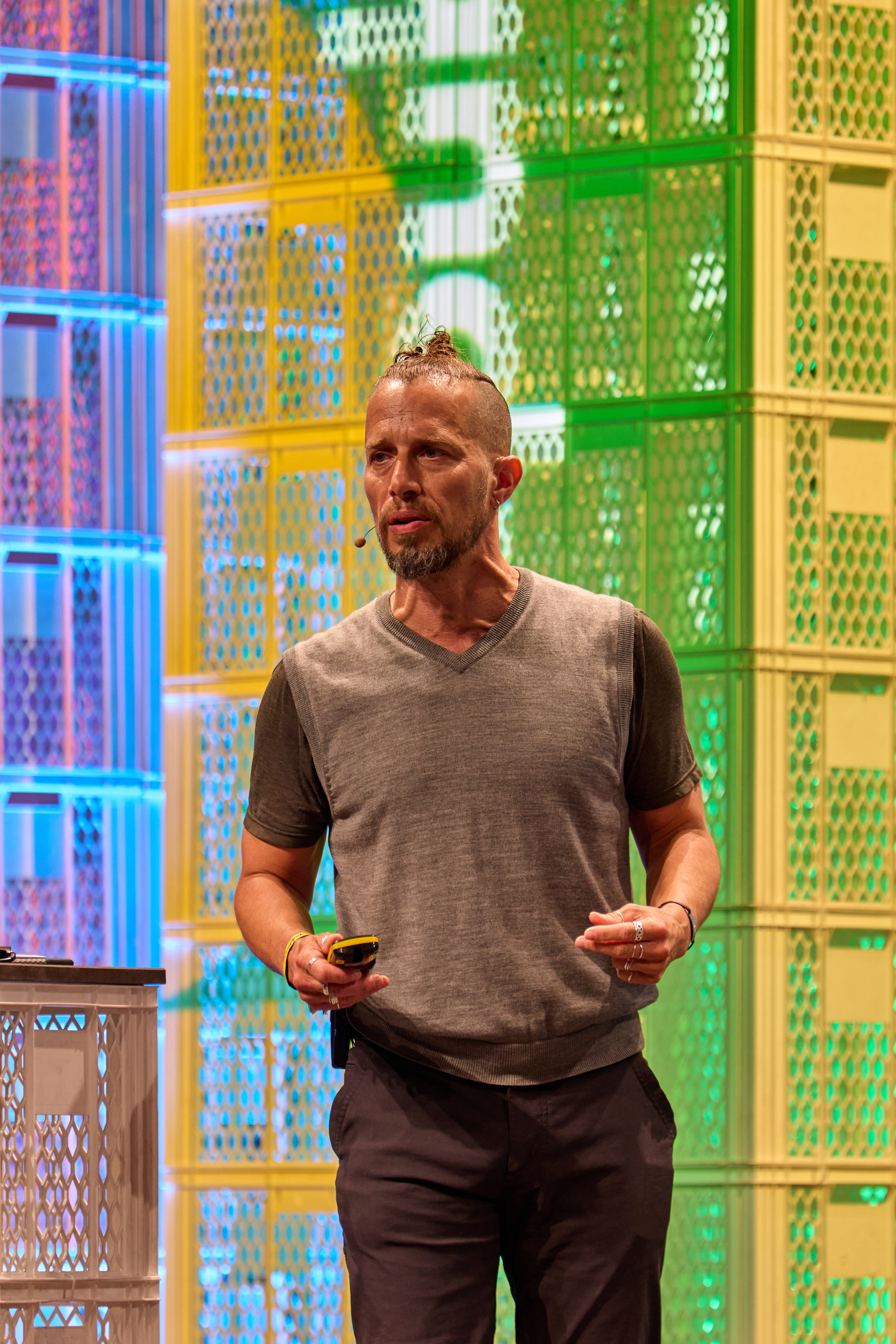
D. Graham Burnett, 2025

D. Graham Burnett is an American historian of science and a writer. He is a professor at Princeton University and an editor at Cabinet, based in Brooklyn, New York.

== Early life and education ==
Burnett received his A.B. in history (concentration in the history of science) at Princeton University and an MPhil and Ph.D. in the history and philosophy of science at Trinity College, Cambridge.

== Books ==
- Masters of All They Surveyed: Exploration, Geography, and a British El Dorado University of Chicago Press. September 2000. ISBN 9780226081212
- Descartes and the Hyperbolic Quest: Lens-Making in the Seventeenth Century American Philosophical Society, Transactions series. Vol. 95 (3): 2005.
- A Trial By Jury Knopf. September 2001; Japanese edition, 2006.
- Trying Leviathan: The Nineteenth-Century New York Court Case That Put the Whale on Trial and Challenged the Order of Nature Princeton University Press. November 2007; paperback edition, 2008.
- A Little Common Place Book, introduction by D. Graham Burnett (New York: Cabinet Books, and Proteotypes, 2010). ISBN 9781932698503, 1932698507
- The Sounding of the Whale: Science and Cetaceans in the Twentieth Century University of Chicago Press. January 2012, paperback edition 2013. ISBN 9780226100579
- Burnett, D. Graham; Hansen, Catherine L.; Smith, Justin E., eds. (2021). In Search of The Third Bird: Exemplary Essays from The Proceedings of ESTAR(SER) 2001-2021. London: Strange Attractor Press. ISBN 978-1913689360.

== Awards and recognition ==
- Salutatorian, Princeton University Class of 1993, gave Latin address at Commencement, 1993
- Moses Taylor Pyne Prize, highest undergraduate award at Princeton University, 1993
- U.S. Marshall Scholarship, 1993–1995
- Nebenzahl Prize in the History of Cartography, Newberry Library, Chicago, 1999
- Cullman Fellow, New York Public Library, Center for Scholars and Writers, 1999-2000
- National Endowment for the Humanities Fellowship, 2003–2004
- Christian Gauss Fund University Preceptorship, Princeton University, 2004–2007
- Howard Foundation Fellowship in the History of Science, 2005-2006
- New York City Book Award, New York Society Library, 2007
- Hermalyn Prize in Urban History, Bronx Historical Society, 2008
- Andrew W. Mellon Foundation “New Directions” Fellowship, 2009-2011
- 2013-2014 Guggenheim Fellow
