= Brenda Zlamany =

American painter and portraitist (born 1959)

- Born: New York City, New York, United States
- Education: Wesleyan University, Skowhegan School of Painting and Sculpture, S. W. Hayter Atelier 17
- Known for: Painting, Portraiture
- Awards: Fulbright Fellowship, Pollock-Krasner Foundation, New York Foundation for the Arts
- Website: brendazlamany.com

Brenda Zlamany, Portrait #138 (David Hockney), oil on panel, 39" x 26", 2014.

Brenda Zlamany is an American artist best known for portraiture that combines Old Master technique with a postmodern conceptual approach. She gained attention beginning in the 1990s, when critics such as Artforum's Barry Schwabsky, Donald Kuspit and John Yau identified her among a small group of figurative painters reviving the neglected legacies of portraiture and classical technique by introducing confrontational subject matter, psychological insight and social critique. Her early portraits of well-known male artists, such as Chuck Close and Leon Golub, reversed conventional artist/sitter gender and power dynamics; her later projects upend the traditionally "heroic" nature of portraiture by featuring underrepresented groups and everyday people.

Zlamany has exhibited at institutions including the Smithsonian National Portrait Gallery, Museum of Contemporary Art Taipei, National Museum, Gdańsk, and New-York Historical Society. Her work has been recognized with a Fulbright Fellowship, Pollock-Krasner Foundation Award, and commissions from Yale University, World Bank and The New York Times Magazine, among others; it belongs to public collections such as the Neuberger Museum of Art and Virginia Museum of Fine Arts. She is based in Brooklyn, New York.

== Early life and career ==
Brenda Zlamany was born in 1959 in New York City and raised in Queens, New York. After a family move to Connecticut, she applied to and was accepted into the Educational Center for the Arts, an arts high school in New Haven; she attended from 1974 to 1977, living on her own in various informal arrangements. During that time, she worked for a city program painting murals, illustrated a children's book, and was invited to attend the Yale College Before College Program, where she studied printmaking, painting and anthropology. Following high school, she studied at Wesleyan University (BA, 1981), the Tyler School of Art in Rome, S. W. Hayter's Atelier 17 in Paris, and the Skowhegan School of Painting and Sculpture.

In 1984, Zlamany took advantage of a Jerome Foundation Fellowship and moved to New York City, working as a master printer with artists such as Julian Schnabel, Vija Celmins and Sol LeWitt, and making etchings at the Bob Blackburn Printmaking Workshop. After moving to Williamsburg, Brooklyn, she began painting and attracting attention with animal still lifes. Between 1984 and 1994, she was featured in solo exhibitions at Hallwalls and E. M. Donahue Gallery (New York), Sabine Wachters Fine Arts (Brussels) and Galerie Quintessens (Utrecht), in group shows at White Columns, Art in General and Artists Space, and alongside artists including Bruce Nauman and Andy Warhol, in shows at Jack Tilton and Blum Helman. In subsequent years, Zlamany has had solo exhibitions at the Stux and Jessica Fredericks galleries (New York), the Fine Arts Center (UMass) (2001) and Museum of Contemporary Art Taipei (2012), and appeared in group shows at the Museum of Contemporary Art Denver, National Portrait Gallery, and several European museums. She continues to live in Williamsburg with her daughter, Oona.

== Work and reception ==
Critics note Zlamany's portraiture for its conceptual slant, postmodern interrogations of the male gaze, traditional subject matter, beauty and representation, and Old Master technique. John Yau and others connect her work, in sensibility if not style, back to figurative modernists such as Alice Neel, Otto Dix and Ivan Albright, contemporary painters like Vija Celmins, Chuck Close, Gregory Gillespie and Alex Katz that integrate elements of abstraction into representational work, and postmodern artists such as John Currin, Elizabeth Peyton and Lisa Yuskavage who have ushered in new, critical and democratic forms of portraiture in recent decades. Distinguishing her from artists that appropriate or parody classical technique, Donald Kuspit placed Zlamany amid a tendency he called "new Old Masterism" that sought "to restore the beauty lost to avant-garde innovation." Other reviewers, such as The New York Times' Holland Cotter, have invoked painters such as Rembrandt, Zurbarán and Chardin in describing Zlamany's handling of color, surface and paint application.

Brenda Zlamany, Shark Head #2, oil on panel, 18" x 14", 1992.

=== Early animal still lifes ===
Zlamany first attracted notice for meticulously rendered paintings of animal carcasses (birds, blowfish, snakes, sharks, iguanas), isolated and floating ambiguously in dark, painterly abstract fields (e.g., Shark Head #2, 1992). She began this work in the mid-1980s as a way to connect to visceral experience and elements of art practice—painting, craft, beauty—that she felt women were discouraged from pursuing. Reviewers noted her mastery of academic glazing techniques, delicate sense of color and texture, and paint application suggestive of both Old Master and Abstract Expressionist technique; in psychological terms, they described the paintings as "disquietingly seductive," vaguely allegorical, icon-like contemplations of life, death, desire and spirituality. Janine Cirincione wrote that they "teeter on the edge of abstraction and representation, old master bravura and postmodern theory, between the seductive and the gruesome," with freewheeling art historical borrowings that challenged both traditional pictorial values and contemporary negations of representational work. Barry Schwabsky likewise noted the work's conceptual preference for investigating materiality and illusionism and art's "half-feared, half-desired" fascination with representation and beauty over realism. In a later series, Zlamany painted posed, live snakes that emphasized linear decoration, pattern and male sexuality while subverting traditional cultural associations of snakes with the feminine.

Brenda Zlamany, Self-Portrait with Benedict and Oxfordshire, oil on panel, 26" x 17", 1998.

=== Portraiture ===
In 1992, Zlamany painted her first human portrait and exhibited it alongside animal still lifes, interested in how the out-of-fashion genre would be received. Positive response inspired her 1994 show, "Twelve Men and Twelve Birds," a deadpan pairing of dead bird and artist portraits (including Chuck Close, Glenn Ligon, Gary Stephan). Writers described them as terse, moody, glowing likenesses that emerged from velvety black, reflective backgrounds and emphasized composition, surface and volume rather than personality or photographic reproduction. Her 1995 show at Sabine Wachters featured portraits of the gallery's other artists—generally middle-aged, bald, male conceptual artists—that Guy Gilsoul called meticulously painted, inaccessible "mixtures of attraction, and repulsion, fascination and aversion." In conceptual terms, critics such as Robert C. Morgan deemed this work a provocative deconstruction that coaxed "exemplars of art world virility" into a passive role in order to glimpse male reality and sexual and power dynamics, reversing centuries of objectification of female subjects. John Yau described them as possessing a "disturbing eroticism" sealed off in dark anonymous space and embalming glazes that dissolved the subjects' power.

In the late 1990s and 2000s, Zlamany, continued painting portraits of male artists and other public figures, while expanding her practice to include a wider range of figurative subjects and a series of Southeast Asian landscapes. Her multi-paneled "Color Studies" works configured monochrome panels and portraits (of Chuck Close, Evander Holyfield, and John Yau) mixed figuration and abstraction, riffing on modernist color theory, rectangles (e.g., the boxing ring), negative space, and Close's use of repetition and the grid. They emphasized the minimal nature of Zlamany's work, which had long eschewed architecture and landscape elements and iconographic cues in favor of composition, proportion, ground color and manner of representation as means of conveying narrative or psychological content. During this time, Zlamany also produced portraits of artists Leonardo Drew, David Humphrey, David Hockney, and Alex Katz among others; the latter two were National Portrait Gallery competition selections.

Brenda Zlamany, Portrait #51 (Detail), oil on panel/linen, ten panels, each 24" x 24", 2000–01.

In 1998, Zlamany painted portraits of her pregnant sister and two sets of self-portraits, one nude and one in profiled poses recalling works by della Francesca; her 2007 show "Facing Family" featured portraits of her parents and daughter. Critics such as Donald Kuspit continued to note her confrontation with representational conventions and Old Master technique and devices in these works and the later Self-Portrait with Oona nursing (2003–4), a stark contemporary rendering of the Madonna and Child motif. They also noted her ability in these works to create narrative, context and inner presence.

=== "The Itinerant Portraitist" ===
Zlamany's international, multiyear project, "The Itinerant Portraitist" (2011– ), explores portraiture focused on nontraditional subjects: indigenous communities in Taipei, orphaned Emirati girls, taxicab drivers in Cuba, and nursing home residents in the Bronx. The series began with a Fulbright Grant-supported project in which she painted 888 watercolor portraits from direct observation of people in remote Taiwan, accompanied by her daughter, Oona, who is fluent in Mandarin; it was realized in the multimedia installation, "888: Portraits in Taiwan" (exhibited in Taipei and New York, 2012).

In later chapters of the project, Zlamany began signaling the social and political implications of specific habitats. In 2017 she painted 100 elderly residents of the Hebrew Home in the Bronx using a camera lucida; that work was exhibited at the Derfner Judaica Museum and documented in the collaborative video, 100/100 (2019, with composer Aaron Jay Kernis), which played several film festivals and won the Best Documentary Short prize at the Greenpoint Film Festival. She continued the project in 2018 with her "Climate in America" portraits of Key West and Sonoma wine country residents and diverse Alaskans during a residency in Denali National Park. In 2020–21, during the COVID-19 pandemic, she painted mask-wearers in upstate New York.

Brenda Zlamany, Yale's First Women Ph.Ds., 1894, oil on linen on panel, 72" x 59", 2016. Yale University commission, permanently installation, Sterling Memorial Library.

=== Public works ===
Zlamany has received portrait commissions from individuals, publications and institutions such as the World Bank and Yale University, among others. She produced portraits of Osama bin Laden (cover), Slobodan Milosevic and Mirjana Marković, Marian Anderson, and Jeffrey Dahmer for special issues of The New York Times Magazine.

She won a national competition for her first Yale commission, Yale's First Women Ph.Ds., 1894 (2015), which commemorates the first seven women to earn Ph.D. degrees at the university. The painting involved extensive research on the women and late-19th century costuming, hairstyles and objects; its composition was developed through the use of paper cutouts of the women in various poses and relationships. The Davenport Dining Room Scene (2018) is a two-canvas group portrait of a departing college dean among a mix of eight professors, students, and university employees of the university that he had formed friendships with during several decades at the school. Yale later commissioned Zlamany to paint the portrait of Elga Ruth Wasserman, who led the effort in 1969 to include the first cohort of women undergraduates and to facilitate coeducation; the colorful painting depicts her seated at a table, with assorted books by and about women spread in front of her.

In 2022, The Rockefeller University unveiled Zlamany's commissioned group portrait, Five Trailblazing Women Scientists at The Rockefeller University (2021), which she created after on-campus research into the scientists and their clothing, instruments and furniture. Zlamany was one of three artists selected in 2023 to paint portraits of prominent 19th-century Black abolitionists—in her case William and Martha Brown—for the Great Hall gallery of Mechanics Hall in Worcester, Massachusetts.

== Collections and recognition ==
Zlamany has been recognized with a Fulbright Fellowship (2011), awards from the Pollock-Krasner Foundation (2006), Peter S. Reed Foundation (2018) and New York Foundation for the Arts (1994), and artist residencies at Denali National Park, ADAH Abu Dhabi, Ucross Foundation, Yaddo, MacDowell Colony, Millay Colony for the Arts, and Triangle Arts Trust, among others.

Her work belongs to the public art collections of the Cincinnati Art Museum, Deutsche Bank, Neuberger Museum of Art, Museum Kaneko, The Rockefeller University, Virginia Museum of Fine Arts, World Bank and Yale University.
