= Anjelica Gonzalez =

American biomedical engineer and scientist

- Education: Utah State University, B.S.; Baylor College of Medicine, Ph.D
- Known for: PremieBreathe
- Scientific career
- Fields: Development of biomimetic materials for use in investigation of immunology, inflammation and fibrosis
- Workplaces: Yale University
- Doctoral advisor: Larry V. McIntire; C. Wayne Smith

Anjelica L. Gonzalez is an American biomedical engineer and scientist. She is an Associate Professor of Biomedical Engineering at Yale University, and is part of the Vascular Biology and Therapeutics Program. Her work focuses primarily on biomimetic materials, or the development of materials that mimic human organs, to study how drugs and other medical interventions can reverse tissue damage caused by environmental pollutants, inflammation, and diseases. She is also the principal investigator for the "PremieBreathe" device which has developed a low-cost device designed to save the lives of premature babies in settings that lack safe respiratory devices.

== Early life ==
Gonzalez's cultural background is Mexican-American and African-American. She grew up Las Vegas, Nevada, and in the Moapa Valley in Nevada. She was raised along with her brother by a single mother who is a blackjack dealer. Her grandfather was director of the Moapa Valley irrigation system and was an early inspiration for her scientific career.She has also discussed being scientifically influenced by her father, a diesel mechanic, who instilled the principles of engineering, and by her mother's mathematical skills.

== Education ==
Gonzalez attended high school in Las Vegas, and went on to attend Utah State University in Logan, Utah. In 1999, Anjelica received her Bachelor of Science in Biological Engineering. She initially planned to pursue a career in computational irrigation management, but later began taking biology courses that eventually influenced her change of career course. Also influencing this decision was a Baylor University summer program where she worked with pulmonary specialist Dr. Aladin Boriek. Gonzalez describes this experience as "the first realization that I had that the math, computational skills, the understanding of mechanics and physics, could translate to the physiological system, to human biology." During her time at Baylor, she worked under Larry McIntire, who she found to be very influential for his work in engineering.

Upon graduating, Gonzalez became the first person from her family to receive a bachelor's degree. In 2004, she obtained her Doctor of Philosophy in Computational Biology from Baylor College of Medicine in Houston, Texas.

During her time at Baylor College of Medicine, Gonzalez was only one of a few minority students in her program, and the only woman actively participating as a graduate student.

Her work includes training students to use a global, interdisciplinary perspective to approach scientific problems. Her research group, the Gonzalez Lab, combines mathematics, molecular biology, chemistry, computational modeling, image analysis, and engineered scaffolds to study the chemo-mechanics of immunological processes. Using these methods, the lab investigates the mechanisms behind various disorders and diseases, including stroke, fibrosis, vascular inflammation, and sepsis.

== Career ==
After graduating from Baylor, Gonzalez conducted post-doctoral work in the Leukocyte Biology and Pediatric Intensive Care Unit at Texas Children's Hospital. She joined the Yale faculty as an associate research scientist in 2007. After two years in this role, she joined the Yale biomedical engineering faculty and in 2014 was appointed the Donna L. Dubinsky Assistant Professor of Biomedical Engineering. As of 2022 she is an appointed associate professor in the Department of Biomedical Engineering at Yale University.

At Yale, Gonzalez developed PremieBreathe, a low-cost mobile neonatal respiratory device meant to treat the breathing problems of prematurely born babies. PremieBreathe was developed and studied in Ethiopia and is supported by the US Agency for International Development (USAID), the Bill and Melinda Gates Foundation, and NCIIA/Venturewell. She is also a founder of Aero Therapeutics, which produces the device.

In the Gonzalez lab she takes interest in teaching the next generation of scientists. She combines multiple different sciences, such as organic chemistry, molecular biology, computational modeling, etc. to analyze the chemo-mechanics of immunological processes.

In 2020, she was also appointed faculty director of the Tsai Center for Innovative Thinking at Yale University (Tsai CITY). In 2022, Gonzalez was appointed head of Davenport College, making her the first Black woman to serve as head of college in Yale's history.

Her areas of research include:

- Leukocyte biology
- Vascular biology
- Biomaterials
- Vascular engineering

== Personal life ==
Gonzalez has twin sons and resides in New Haven, Connecticut. She plays the violin and enjoys sewing her own clothing. Her favorite baseball player is Shohei Ohtani.

== Awards & honors ==
Anjelica has earned numerous awards and distinctions. Here are a selection:

- In 2021, Gonzalez was inducted into Yale University's Bouchet Honor Society, named for alumnus Edward Alexander Bouchet
- Yale University - Provost's Teaching Award
- Yale University's Video Series "Discussions on Science and Diversity" - Host
- Yale University's inaugural Faculty of Arts and Sciences Dean's Award for Inclusion and Belonging
- STEM and Social Inclusion Speaker Series - First Speaker
- Newsweek/Womensphere Emerging Leaders Global Summit Speaker
- NBC 10 Latino Innovators
- USAID/Gates Foundation DevelopmentxChange Investor Pitch Competition Award Winner
- Hartwell Individual Biomedical Research Award for "Artificial Amniotic Membrane Scaffolds for Scarless Wound Healing" (2011)
- Biomedical Engineering Society Diversity Award (2018)
- American Institute for Medical and Biological Engineering College of Fellows Induction (2020)

== Publications ==
=== Books ===
- Engineering Biomaterials for Regenerative Medicine: Novel Technologies for Clinical Applications, Chp. 6, p. 143-160 (co-author) Springer (2011)

=== Journals ===
Gonzalez has more than 60 publications. Her most cited work has been cited over 1814 times

Here is a selection of her works that have been cited over 70 times each:

- Nanowire substrate-based laser scanning cytometry for quantitation of circulating tumor cells (2012)

SK Lee, GS Kim, Y Wu, DJ Kim, Y Lu, M Kwak, L Han, JH Hyung, JK Seol, ... Nano Letters

- Extracellular mitochondrial DNA is generated by fibroblasts and predicts death in idiopathic pulmonary fibrosis (2017)

C Ryu, H Sun, M Gulati, JD Herazo-Maya, Y Chen, A Osafo-Addo, ... American Journal of Respiratory and Critical Care Medicine

- Daily egg consumption in hyperlipidemic adults-Effects on endothelial function and cardiovascular risk (2010)

V Njike, Z Faridi, S Dutta, AL Gonzalez-Simon, DL Katz Nutrition Journal

- Integrin interactions with immobilized peptides in polyethylene glycol diacrylate hydrogels (2004)

AL Gonzalez, AS Gobin, JL West, LV McIntire, CW Smith Tissue engineering

=== Articles ===
Gonzalez has contributed opinion articles to multiple publications, including:

- "A Life of Science Was In The Cards," The New York Times
- "Her Scientific Discovery: Support," The New York Times
- "Transitioning from Undergraduate to Graduate School," Science

== Quotes ==
Gonzalez speaks out for women and minorities:

- "Data shows that women and minorities are selectively sorted out of engineering, math and science careers."
- "Additionally, when they do speak up and exhibit their skills, young women are often overlooked or blatantly dismissed."
- "Studies have evaluated whether hard work is rewarded in a fair manner, and determined that cultural norms and implicit biases in many cases prevent equal reward for equal efforts."
