= Jeffrey Hubbell =

Molecular engineer

- Born: North Kansas City, Missouri, US

Academic background
- Education: B.S., chemical engineering, 1982, Kansas State University; Ph.D., chemical engineering, 1986, Rice University
- Thesis: Visualization and Analysis of Mural Thrombogenesis (Platelet Adhesion, Collagen, Polyurethane, Digital Image Processing) (1986)

Jeffrey Alan Hubbell is an American bioengineer working in immunoengineering. His research has focused on topics including physical biology, biomaterials, regenerative medicine, and translational immunology.

== Early life and education ==
He received his bachelor's degree from Kansas State University and his PhD from Rice University, both in chemical engineering. His doctoral mentor was Larry V. McIntire, in a project addressing the biophysics of thrombosis.

== Career ==
Upon completing his PhD, Hubbell joined the Chemical Engineering Department at the University of Texas. In 1995, he moved to the Division of Chemistry and Chemical Engineering at Caltech, and then in 1997 to the Institute of Biomedical Engineering at ETH Zurich and the University of Zurich.

In 2003 Hubbell joined the faculty at Switzerland's École Polytechnique Fédérale de Lausanne (EPFL) where he served as the founding director of the Institute of Bioengineering. Hubbell remained in Switzerland until 2014 when he accepted a position at the University of Chicago faculty of the Pritzker School of Molecular Engineering as their Barry L. MacLean Professor for Molecular Engineering Innovation and Enterprise. By 2017, Hubbell was the recipient of the Society for Biomaterials’ Founders Award for his "long-term, landmark contributions to the discipline of biomaterials." He was specifically recognized for designing materials to assemble and function so they could stimulate the immune system to fight infection or malignancy and coining the term "immuno-modulatory materials." In the same year, Hubbell was awarded the Acta Biomaterialia Gold Medal and appointed the inaugural Bell Professor in Tissue Engineering at the University of Chicago.

In 1995, Hubbell was elected a fellow of the American Institute for Medical and Biological Engineering for his "fundamental and clinically-applied contributions to biomaterials." In 2010, he was elected to the National Academy of Engineering “for contributions to the science, engineering, and technology of bioactive materials for the benefit of patients.” Upon joining the University of Chicago, Hubbell collaborated with Cathryn Nagler to establish the ClostraBio, a company to develop drugs. In 2018, Hubbell was also elected a Member of the National Academy of Medicine for his work "pioneering the development of cell responsive (bioactive) materials and inventing biomaterials that are now widely utilized in regenerative medicine." Following this, he helped develop a vaccine platform for infectious disease. In 2021, Hubbell was one of eight University of Chicago faculty members elected to the American Academy of Arts and Sciences. In 2023, he was elected to the third national academy, the National Academy of Sciences. He was also elected a fellow of the National Academy of Inventors.

As to recent research, in 2019 and 2023, Hubbell and colleagues, including D. Scott Wilson, published an approach to inverse vaccination, with implications for treatment of autoimmunity. In April 2020, Hubbell, Melody Swartz, and Jun Ishihara co-published their research on an immunotherapy delivery system that finds tumors by seeking out and binding to the tumors’ collagen. Following this development, he helped design a new therapy to eventually assist those with autoimmune diseases by fusing a tolerogenic cytokine to a blood protein that accumulates in the lymph nodes.

Effective November 15th, 2024, Hubbell was appointed as professor of chemical and biomolecular engineering in the Tandon School of Engineering with appointments in the Grossman School of Medicine and the Faculty of Arts and Sciences at NYU, leading a cross-institutional initiative with NYU Langone while also serving as Vice President for bioengineering strategy. The aim of this cross-institutional initiative expects to develop a "strong immune-engineering focus, including: autoimmunity, inflammatory disease, allergy, transplantation, neurodegeneration, cardiometabolic disease, tissue repair, cancer immunotherapy, vaccination, and infectious disease."
