= Cancer immunology =

Study of the role of the immune system in cancer

Tumor-associated immune cells in the tumor microenvironment (TME) of breast cancer models

Cancer immunology (immuno-oncology) is an interdisciplinary branch of biology and a sub-discipline of immunology that is concerned with understanding the role of the immune system in the progression and development of cancer; the most well known application is cancer immunotherapy, which utilizes the immune system as a treatment for cancer. Cancer Immunosurveillance and immunoediting are based on protection against development of tumors in animal systems and (ii) identification of targets for immune recognition of human cancer.

== Definition ==
Cancer immunology is an interdisciplinary branch of biology concerned with the role of the immune system in the progression and development of cancer; the most well known application is cancer immunotherapy, where the immune system is used to treat cancer. Cancer Immunosurveillance is a theory formulated in 1957 by Burnet and Thomas, who proposed that lymphocytes act as sentinels in recognizing and eliminating continuously arising, nascent transformed cells. Cancer immunosurveillance appears to be an important host protection process that decreases cancer rates through inhibition of carcinogenesis and maintaining of regular cellular homeostasis. It has also been suggested that immunosurveillance primarily functions as a component of a more general process of cancer immunoediting.

== Tumor antigens ==
Tumors may express tumor antigens that are recognized by the immune system and may induce an immune response. These tumor antigens are either TSA (Tumor-specific antigen) or TAA (Tumor-associated antigen).

=== Tumor-specific ===
Tumor-specific antigens (TSA) are antigens that only occur in tumor cells. TSAs can be products of Oncoviruses like E6 and E7 proteins of human papillomavirus, occurring in cervical carcinoma, or EBNA-1 protein of EBV, occurring in Burkitt's lymphoma cells. Another example of TSAs are abnormal products of mutated oncogenes (e.g. Ras protein) and anti-oncogenes (e.g. p53).

=== Tumor-associated antigens ===
Tumor-associated antigens (TAA) are present in healthy cells, but for some reason they also occur in tumor cells. However, they differ in quantity, place or time period of expression. Oncofetal antigens are tumor-associated antigens expressed by embryonic cells and by tumors. Examples of oncofetal antigens are AFP (α-fetoprotein), produced by hepatocellular carcinoma, or CEA (carcinoembryonic antigen), occurring in ovarian and colon cancer. More tumor-associated antigens are HER2/neu, EGFR or MAGE-1.

== Immunoediting ==
Cancer immunoediting is a process in which immune system interacts with tumor cells. It consists of three phases: elimination, equilibrium and escape. These phases are often referred to as "the three Es" of cancer immunoediting. Both adaptive and innate immune system participate in immunoediting.

In the elimination phase, the immune response leads to destruction of tumor cells and therefore to tumor suppression. However, some tumor cells may gain more mutations, change their characteristics and evade the immune system. These cells might enter the equilibrium phase, in which the immune system does not recognize all tumor cells, but at the same time the tumor does not grow. This condition may lead to the phase of escape, in which the tumor gains dominance over immune system, starts growing and establishes immunosuppressive environment.

As a consequence of immunoediting, tumor cell clones less responsive to the immune system gain dominance in the tumor through time, as the recognized cells are eliminated. This process may be considered akin to Darwinian evolution, where cells containing pro-oncogenic or immunosuppressive mutations survive to pass on their mutations to daughter cells, which may themselves mutate and undergo further selective pressure. This results in the tumor consisting of cells with decreased immunogenicity and can hardly be eliminated. This phenomenon was proven to happen as a result of immunotherapies of cancer patients.

== Tumor evasion mechanisms ==
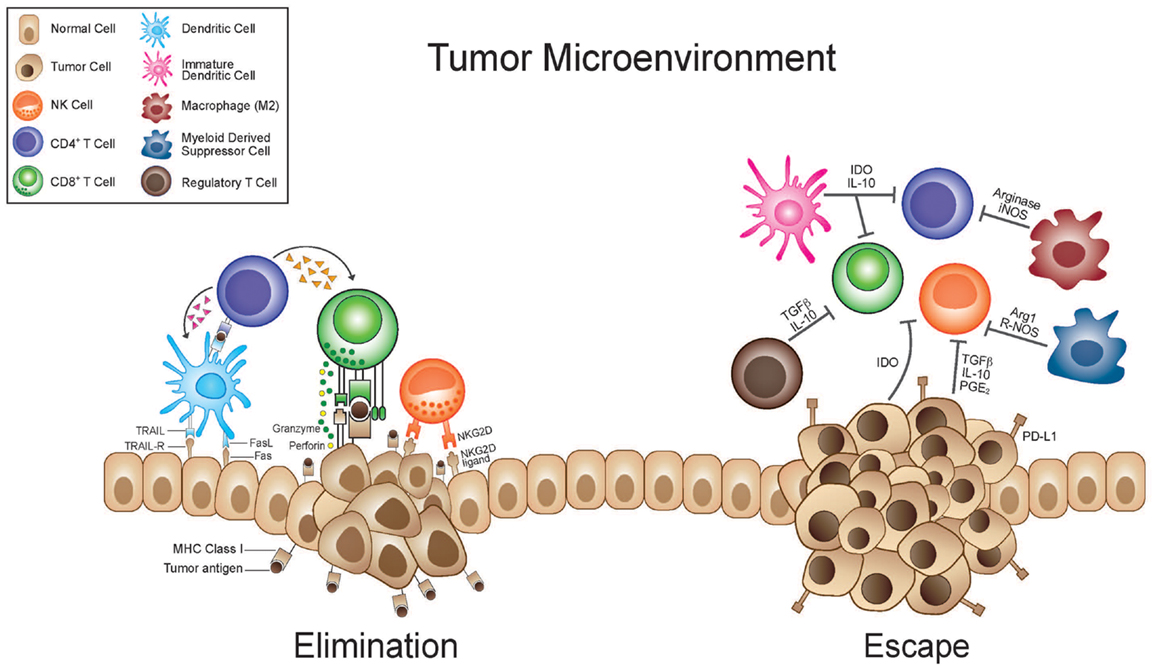
Multiple factors determine whether tumor cells will be eliminated by the immune system or will escape detection. During the elimination phase immune effector cells such as CTL's and NK cells with the help of dendritic and CD4+ T-cells are able to recognize and eliminate tumor cells.

- CD8+ cytotoxic T cells are a fundamental element of anti-tumor immunity. Their TCR receptors recognise antigens presented by MHC class I and when bound, the Tc cell triggers its cytotoxic activity. MHC I are present on the surface of all nucleated cells. However, some cancer cells lower their MHC I expression and avoid being detected by the cytotoxic T cells. This can be done by mutation of MHC I gene or by lowering the sensitivity to IFN-γ (which influences the surface expression of MHC I). Tumor cells also have defects in antigen presentation pathway, what leads into down-regulation of tumor antigen presentations. Defects are for example in transporter associated with antigen processing (TAP) or tapasin. On the other hand, a complete loss of MHC I is a trigger for NK cells. Tumor cells therefore maintain a low expression of MHC I.
- Another way to escape cytotoxic T cells is to stop expressing molecules essential for co-stimulation of cytotoxic T cells, such as CD80 or CD86.
- Tumor cells express molecules to induce apoptosis or to inhibit T lymphocytes:
  - Expression of FasL on its surface, tumor cells may induce apoptosis of T lymphocytes by FasL-Fas interaction.
  - Expression of PD-L1 on the surface of tumor cells leads to suppression of T lymphocytes by PD1-PD-L1 interaction.
- Tumor cells have gained resistance to effector mechanisms of NK and cytotoxic CD8+ T cell:
  - by loss of gene expression or inhibition of apoptotic signal pathway molecules: APAF1, Caspase 8, Bcl-2-associated X protein (bax) and Bcl-2 homologous antagonist killer (bak).
  - by induction of expression or overexpression of antiapoptotic molecules: Bcl-2, IAP or XIAP.

=== Tumor microenvironment ===
Immune checkpoints of immunosuppressive actions associated with breast cancer

- Production of TGF-β by tumor cells and other cells (such as myeloid-derived suppressor cell) leads to conversion of CD4+ T cell into suppressive regulatory T cell (Treg) by a contact dependent or independent stimulation. In a healthy tissue, functioning Tregs are essential to maintain self-tolerance. In a tumor, however, Tregs form an immunosuppressive microenvironment.
- Tumor cells produce special cytokines (such as colony-stimulating factor) to produce myeloid-derived suppressor cell. These cells are heterogenous collection of cell types including precursors of dendritic cell, monocyte and neutrophil. MDSC have suppressive effects on T-lymphocytes, dendritic cells and macrophages. They produce immunosuppressive TGF-β and IL-10.
- Another producer of suppressive TGF-β and IL-10 are tumor-associated macrophages, these macrophages have mostly phenotype of alternatively activated M2 macrophages. Their activation is promoted by TH type 2 cytokines (such as IL-4 and IL-13). Their main effects are immunosuppression, promotion of tumor growth and angiogenesis.
- Tumor cells have non-classical MHC class I on their surface, for example HLA-G. HLA-G is inducer of Treg, MDSC, polarise macrophages into alternatively activated M2 and has other immunosuppressive effects on immune cells.

== Immunomodulation methods ==
Immune system is the key player in fighting cancer. As described above in mechanisms of tumor evasion, the tumor cells are modulating the immune response in their profit. It is possible to improve the immune response in order to boost the immunity against tumor cells.

- monoclonal anti-CTLA4 and anti-PD-1 antibodies are called immune checkpoint inhibitors:
  - CTLA-4 is a receptor upregulated on the membrane of activated T lymphocytes, CTLA-4 CD80/86 interaction leads to switch off of T lymphocytes. By blocking this interaction with monoclonal anti CTLA-4 antibody we can increase the immune response. An example of approved drug is Ipilimumab.
  - PD-1 is also an upregulated receptor on the surface of T lymphocytes after activation. Interaction PD-1 with PD-L1 leads to switching off or apoptosis. PD-L1 are molecules which can be produced by tumor cells. The monoclonal anti-PD-1 antibody is blocking this interaction thus leading to improvement of immune response in CD8+ T lymphocytes. An example of approved cancer drug is Nivolumab.
  - Chimeric Antigen Receptor T cell
    - This CAR receptors are genetically engineered receptors with extracellular tumor specific binding sites and intracellular signaling domain that enables the T lymphocyte activation.
  - Cancer vaccine
    - Vaccine can be composed of killed tumor cells, recombinant tumor antigens, or dendritic cells incubated with tumor antigens (dendritic cell-based cancer vaccine)

== Relationship to chemotherapy ==
Obeid et al. investigated how inducing immunogenic cancer cell death ought to become a priority of cancer chemotherapy. He reasoned, the immune system would be able to play a factor via a 'bystander effect' in eradicating chemotherapy-resistant cancer cells. However, extensive research is still needed on how the immune response is triggered against dying tumour cells.

Professionals in the field have hypothesized that 'apoptotic cell death is poorly immunogenic whereas necrotic cell death is truly immunogenic'. This is perhaps because cancer cells being eradicated via a necrotic cell death pathway induce an immune response by triggering dendritic cells to mature, due to inflammatory response stimulation. On the other hand, apoptosis is connected to slight alterations within the plasma membrane causing the dying cells to be attractive to phagocytic cells. However, numerous animal studies have shown the superiority of vaccination with apoptotic cells, compared to necrotic cells, in eliciting anti-tumor immune responses.

Thus Obeid et al. propose that the way in which cancer cells die during chemotherapy is vital. Anthracyclins produce a beneficial immunogenic environment. The researchers report that when killing cancer cells with this agent uptake and presentation by antigen presenting dendritic cells is encouraged, thus allowing a T-cell response which can shrink tumours. Therefore, activating tumour-killing T-cells is crucial for immunotherapy success.

However, advanced cancer patients with immunosuppression have left researchers in a dilemma as to how to activate their T-cells. The way the host dendritic cells react and uptake tumour antigens to present to CD4^{+} and CD8^{+} T-cells is the key to success of the treatment.

== See also ==
- Oncogenomics
