= Lütolf =

Lütolf is a surname. Notable people with the surname include:

- Aloys Lütolf (1824–1879), Swiss Catholic ecclesiastical historian
- Marc Lütolf (born 1987), Swiss association footballer
- Matthias Lütolf, Swiss biomedical engineer
- Remo Lütolf (born 1980), Swiss breaststroke swimmer
