= Matthias Lütolf =

Swiss biomedical engineer

Professor Matthias Lütolf
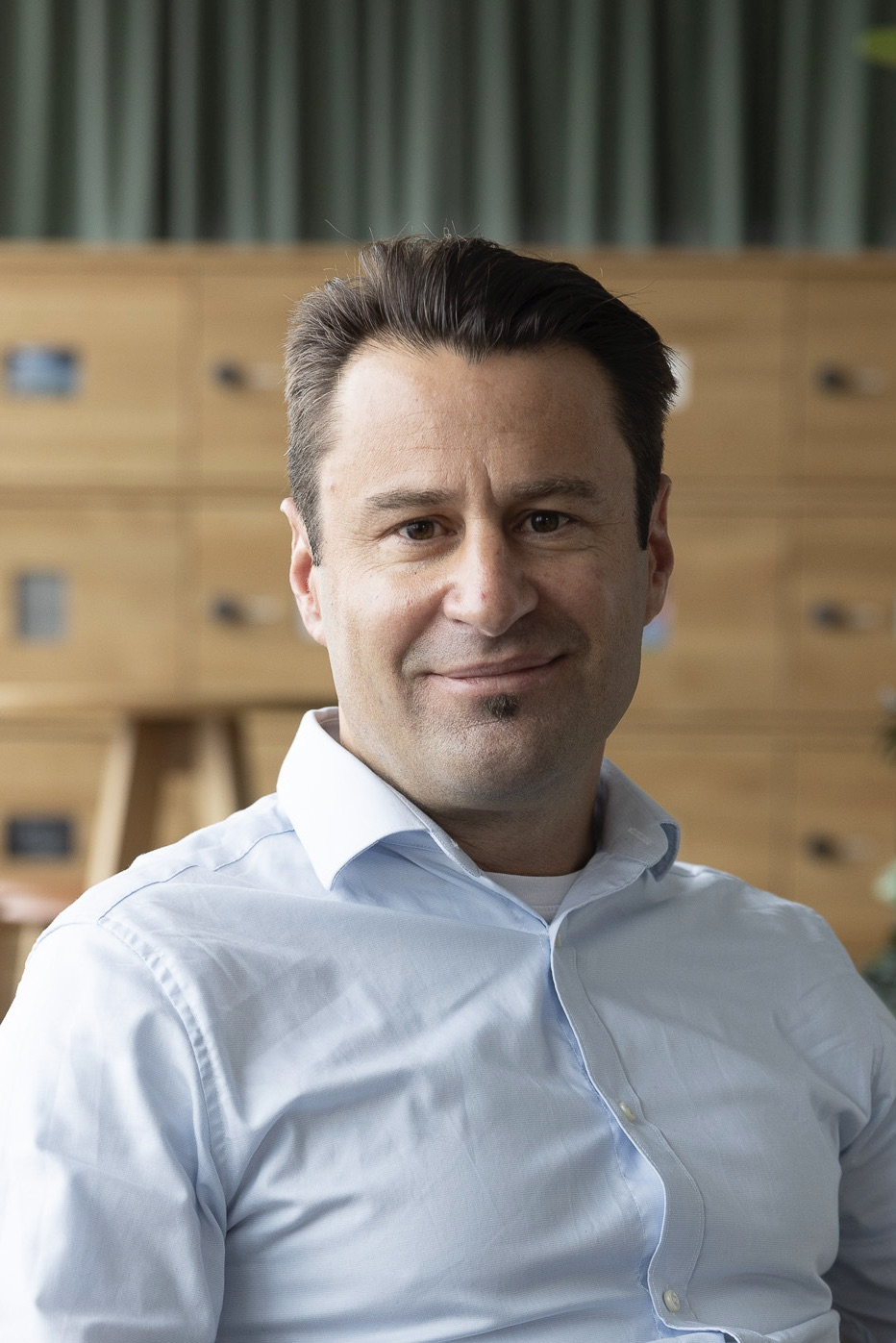
- Lutolf Portrait
- Born: 1973 (age 52–53)
- Citizenship: Swiss
- Education: Materials engineering Biomedical engineering
- Alma mater: ETH Zurich; Stanford University
- Known for: Biomaterials stem cell biology Organoid models
- Scientific career
- Fields: Stem Cells; Biomaterials; Tissue Engineering; Microfluidics; Single-Cell Analysis; High-Throughput Screening
- Institutions: EPFL (École Polytechnique Fédérale de Lausanne)
- Thesis: Cell-responsive synthetic hydrogels (2002)
- Doctoral advisor: Jeffrey Hubbell
- Website: www.epfl.ch/labs/lutolf-lab/

Matthias Lutolf (born in 1973, also known as Matthias Lütolf) is a Swiss bio-engineer and a professor at EPFL (École Polytechnique Fédérale de Lausanne). In 2021, he became the Scientific Director for Roche's Institute for Translation Bioengineering in Basel.

== Education ==
Lutolf studied materials engineering at ETH Zurich where he graduated in 1998. In 2002, he received his PhD in biomedical engineering from ETH Zurich for his studies on cell-responsive hydrogels for tissue engineering and cell culture, in the group of Jeffrey Hubbell.

== Career ==
He completed postdoctoral studies in the laboratory of Helen Blau at Stanford University, where he worked on novel cell culture approaches for blood and muscle stem cells, so called synthetic niches. In 2007, he founded his own laboratory at EPFL, where he was promoted to associate professor in 2014 and full professor in 2018. From 2014 to 2018, he was director of EPFL's Institute of Bioengineering. In June 2021, Lutolf became scientific director of the newly established Roche Institute for Translational Bioengineering in Basel, Switzerland.

Following the launch of Roche's Institute of Human Biology (IHB) in May 2023, he became its Founding Director, where he also heads the Translational Bioengineering core and leads the Multi-Tissue Systems Engineering laboratory.

== Research ==
Lütolf has made contributions at the interface of biomaterials, stem cell biology, and organoid technology. Early in his career, he was a key contributor to the invention and commercialization of novel synthetic extracellular matrices and hydrogels that enable in situ tissue engineering, promoting regeneration directly in vivo, with publications in PNAS (2003), Advanced Materials (2003), and Nature Biotechnology (2003, 2005). Lutolf's laboratory develops in vitro organoids mimicking healthy and diseased tissues and organs.

Lütolf's laboratory has also pioneered designer matrices for organoid culture, including the first chemically defined systems that support robust and reproducible growth of intestinal and other stem cell–derived organoids.

Expanding this work, his team has invented strategies for engineering organoids, integrating bioengineering principles to guide stem cell differentiation and tissue organization, yielding models with enhanced reproducibility and physiological fidelity. More recently, Lütolf has led efforts to create next-generation cancer organoid models, including “mini-colon” systems that reproduce tumour initiation, progression, and microenvironmental interactions, described in Nature Biotechnology (2024), Nature (2024), and Nature Materials (2022).

== Awards and honors ==
In 2007, Lutolf received the European Young Investigator (EURYI) Award by the European Science Foundation. Since 2018, he is elected as member of the European Molecular Biology Organization (EMBO). He serves as associate editor of The Company of Biologists' journal Development.

== Publications ==
- Hofer M, Lutolf MP (May 2021). "Engineering organoids". Nature Reviews. Materials. 6 (5): 402–420. Bibcode:2021NatRM...6..402H. doi:10.1038/s41578-021-00279-y. PMC 7893133. PMID 33623712.
- Lutolf, M P; Hubbell, J A (January 2005). "Synthetic biomaterials as instructive extracellular microenvironments for morphogenesis in tissue engineering". Nature Biotechnology. 23 (1): 47–55. doi:10.1038/nbt1055. ISSN 1087-0156. PMID 15637621. S2CID 6706970.
- Kwan, Jennifer A.; Schulze, Costas J.; Wang, Wenjie; Leon, Hernando; Sariahmetoglu, Meltem; Sung, Miranda; Sawicka, Jolanta; Sims, David E.; Sawicki, Grzegorz; Schulz, Richard (2004). "Matrix metalloproteinase-2 (MMP-2) is present in the nucleus of cardiac myocytes and is capable of cleaving poly (ADP-ribose) polymerase (PARP) in vitro". The FASEB Journal. 18 (6): 690–692. doi:10.1096/fj.02-1202fje. ISSN 0892-6638. PMID 14766804.
- Nikolaev, Mikhail; Mitrofanova, Olga; Broguiere, Nicolas; Geraldo, Sara; Dutta, Devanjali; Tabata, Yoji; Elci, Bilge; Brandenberg, Nathalie; Kolotuev, Irina; Gjorevski, Nikolce; Clevers, Hans; Lutolf, Matthias P. (2020-09-24). "Homeostatic mini-intestines through scaffold-guided organoid morphogenesis". Nature. 585 (7826): 574–578. Bibcode:2020Natur.585..574N. doi:10.1038/s41586-020-2724-8. ISSN 0028-0836.
- Lutolf, M.P.; Raeber, G.P.; Zisch, A.H.; Tirelli, N.; Hubbell, J.A. (2003-06-05). "Cell-Responsive Synthetic Hydrogels". Advanced Materials. 15 (11): 888–892. Bibcode:2003AdM....15..888L. doi:10.1002/adma.200304621. ISSN 0935-9648.
- Knobloch, Marlen; Braun, Simon M. G.; Zurkirchen, Luis; von Schoultz, Carolin; Zamboni, Nicola; Araúzo-Bravo, Marcos J.; Kovacs, Werner J.; Karalay, Özlem; Suter, Ueli; Machado, Raquel A. C.; Roccio, Marta; Lutolf, Matthias P.; Semenkovich, Clay F.; Jessberger, Sebastian (January 2013). "Metabolic control of adult neural stem cell activity by Fasn-dependent lipogenesis". Nature. 493 (7431): 226–230. Bibcode:2013Natur.493..226K. doi:10.1038/nature11689. ISSN 0028-0836. PMC 3587167. PMID 23201681.
- Martino, Mikaël M.; Briquez, Priscilla S.; Ranga, Adrian; Lutolf, Matthias P.; Hubbell, Jeffrey A. (2013-03-19). "Heparin-binding domain of fibrin(ogen) binds growth factors and promotes tissue repair when incorporated within a synthetic matrix". Proceedings of the National Academy of Sciences. 110 (12): 4563–4568. Bibcode:2013PNAS..110.4563M. doi:10.1073/pnas.1221602110. ISSN 0027-8424. PMC 3607046. PMID 23487783.
- Beccari, Leonardo; Moris, Naomi; Girgin, Mehmet; Turner, David A.; Baillie-Johnson, Peter; Cossy, Anne-Catherine; Lutolf, Matthias P.; Duboule, Denis; Arias, Alfonso Martinez (October 2018). "Multi-axial self-organization properties of mouse embryonic stem cells into gastruloids". Nature. 562 (7726): 272–276. Bibcode:2018Natur.562..272B. doi:10.1038/s41586-018-0578-0. ISSN 0028-0836. PMID 30283134.
- Huch, Meritxell; Knoblich, Juergen A.; Lutolf, Matthias P.; Martinez-Arias, Alfonso (2017-03-15). "The hope and the hype of organoid research". Development. 144 (6): 938–941. doi:10.1242/dev.150201. ISSN 0950-1991.
