= Cathryn Nagler =

American immunologist

Academic background
- Education: BSc, biology, 1979, Barnard College; PhD, immunology, 1986, New York University Grossman School of Medicine
- Thesis: Immunoregulation of an experimental model of autoimmunity: collagen-induced arthritis (1986)

Cathryn R. Nagler is an American immunologist. She is the Bunning Family Professor in the Pritzker School of Molecular Engineering, the Department of Pathology, and the college at the University of Chicago. Nagler is also the co-founder and president of the startup company ClostraBio, Inc.

In 2004, Nagler and her colleagues discovered that peanuts provoked anaphylaxis only in mice with a mutated TLR4 receptor, not in genetically related strains with a normal TLR4. Later, Nagler and her colleagues identified significant differences between the gut bacteria of infants who had an allergy to cow's milk and healthy infants.

== Early life and education ==
Growing up, Nagler broke out in hives whenever she ate eggs and reacted to penicillin. She graduated from Barnard College in 1979 with her Bachelor of Science degree in biology and her PhD in immunology from the New York University Grossman School of Medicine. Following her PhD, Nagler completed a postdoctoral fellowship at the Massachusetts Institute of Technology.

== Career ==
Four years after finishing her graduate work, Nagler started running a lab at Harvard Medical School. During her tenure at Harvard, she was first to show, in an animal model, that feeding potential autoantigens to a subject prior to immunizing them could protect the animal from developing an autoimmune response. In 2004, Nagler and her colleagues published a report showing that peanuts provoked anaphylaxis only in mice with a mutated TLR4 receptor, not in genetically related strains with a normal TLR4. She eventually left Harvard in 2009 to accept a similar faculty position at the University of Chicago. By 2011, she was appointed the inaugural Bunning Food Allergy Professor.

In 2015, Nagler and her team identified differences between the gut bacteria of infants who had cow's milk allergies and those of healthy infants of the same age. Following this discovery, Nagler received a technology pilot award from the Institute for Translational Medicine and teamed up with Jeffrey Hubbell to launch ClostraBio. The aim of ClostraBio was to create microbiome-based treatments for people with life-threatening food allergies. In 2019, as president and co-founder of ClostraBio, her research team studied the effects of gut bacteria and food allergies. She transplanted gut bacteria from the babies in her study into germ-free mice—mice born by C-section and showed that allergic and nonallergic infants had different communities of gut bacteria.

During the COVID-19 pandemic, Nagler was recognized as a distinguished fellow of the American Association of Immunologists for her outstanding contributions to immunology. Following this, she led a study with scientists from Stanford University which identified fecal microbiome differences in food allergies between pairs of twins. Nagler also served as the co-chair of the education committee for the Federation of Clinical Immunology Societies and taught in the FOCIS Advanced Course in Basic and Clinical Immunology.
