= Pierson College =

Residential college at Yale University

- Yale University
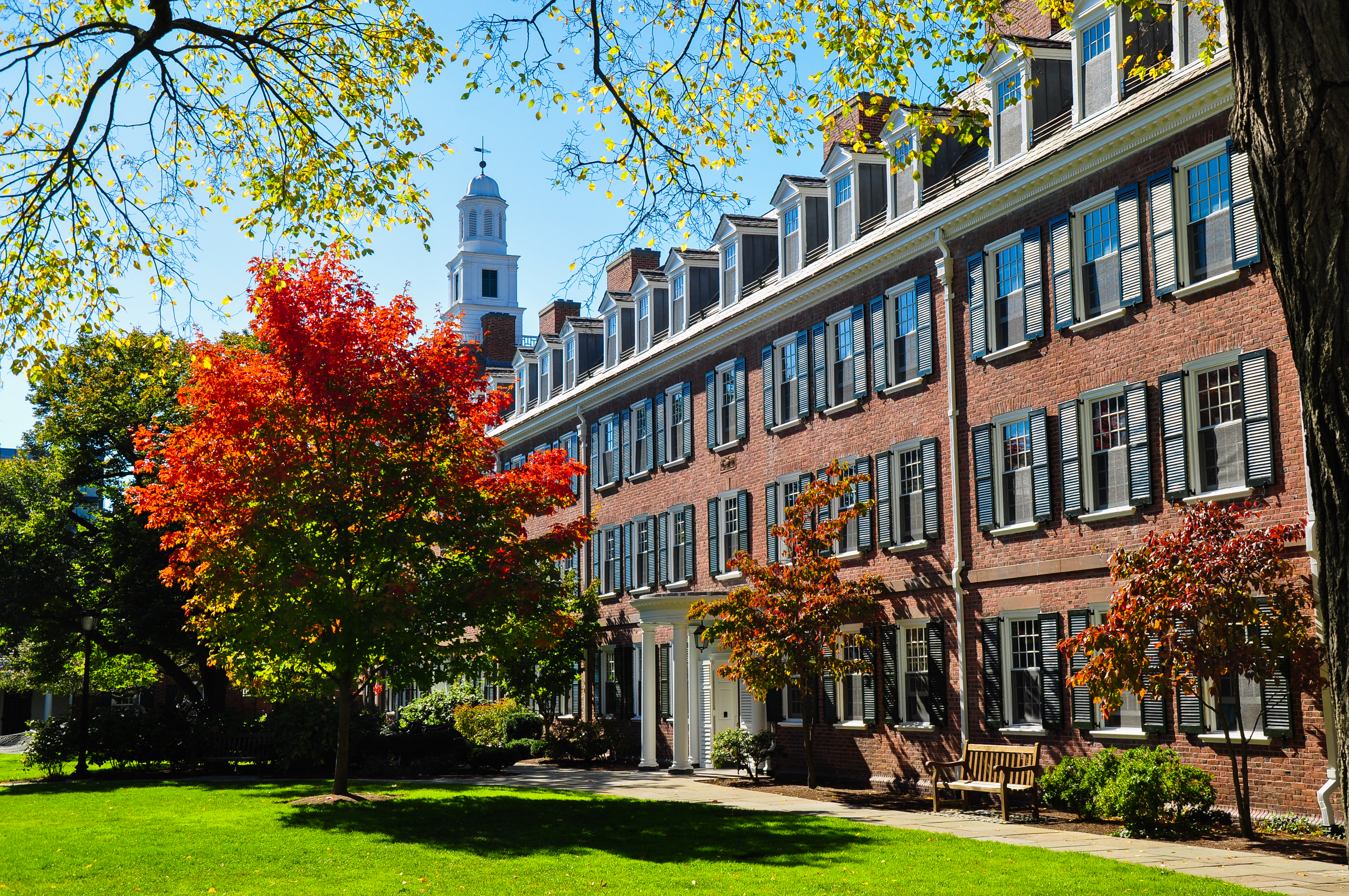

- Coat of arms of Pierson College
- Location: 261 Park Street
- Coordinates: 41°18′36″N 72°55′57″W
- Motto: Ad augusta per angusta (Latin)
- Motto in English: Through trial to triumph
- Established: 1933
- Named for: Abraham Pierson
- Colors: Black, gold
- Sister college: Lowell House, Harvard
- Head: Crystal Feimster
- Dean: Tasha Hawthorne
- Undergraduates: 496 (2013-2014)
- Mascot: Knights
- Called: Piersonites, Pierson-Knights
- Website: www.yale.edu/pierson/

Pierson College is a residential college at Yale University in New Haven, Connecticut. Opened in 1933, it is named for Abraham Pierson, a founder and the first rector of the Collegiate School, the college later known as Yale. With just under 500 undergraduate members, Pierson is the largest of Yale's residential colleges by number of students.

== History ==
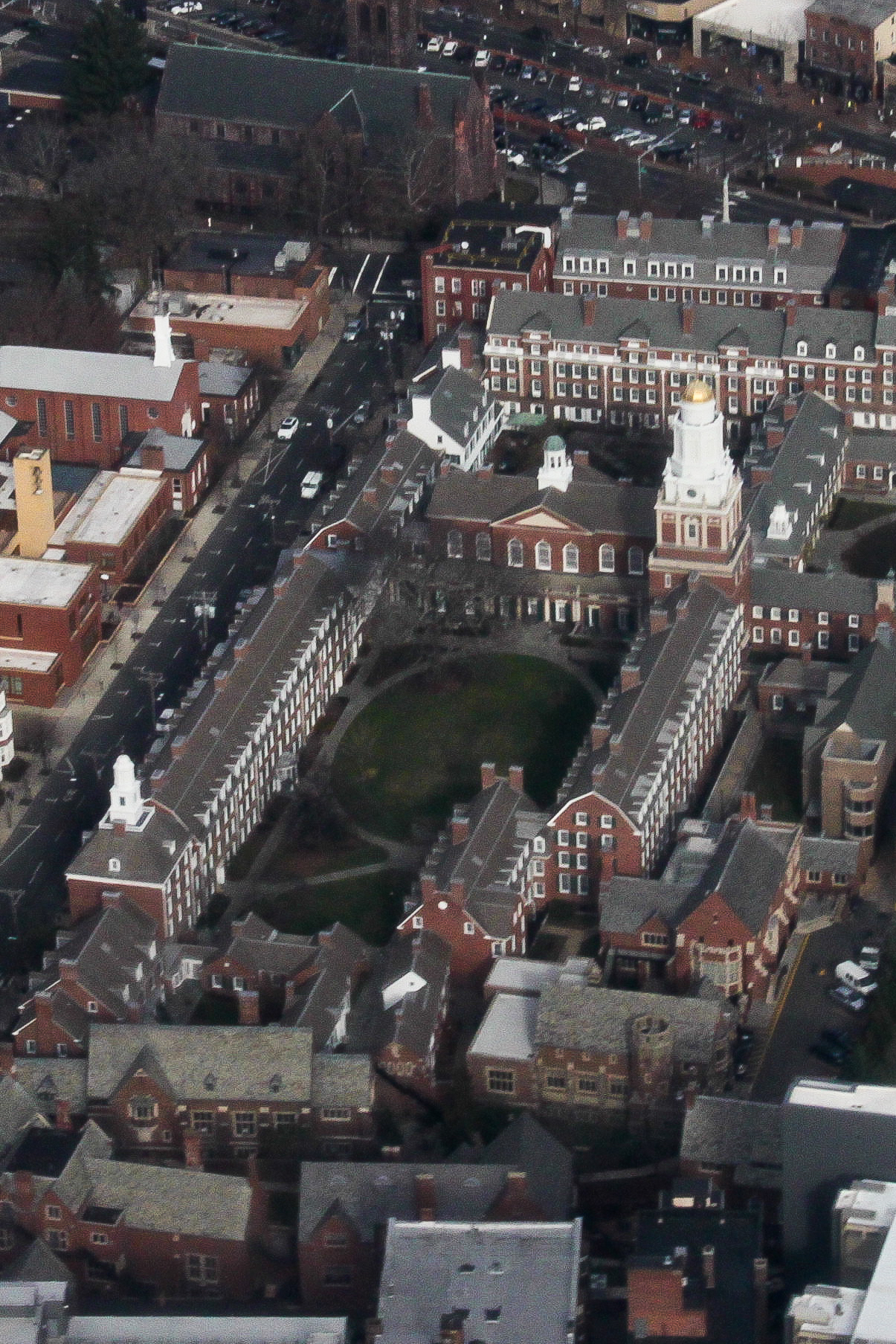
The college's building and grounds from above, with Davenport College (at top)

Yale built the Pierson College buildings in the Georgian or "Georgian Revival" architectural style. These include a prominent tower, inspired by that of Philadelphia's Independence Hall. It is one of the eight original residential colleges bequeathed by Edward Harkness and designed by James Gamble Rogers.

Pierson College's first master was Alan Valentine, then in 1935 international relations scholar Arnold Wolfers took over the role, one he held until 1949. Wolfers and his wife Doris made the Master's House at Pierson a center for entertaining on the campus second only to the house of the president of the university. Among those they hosted where diplomats who visited the campus.

During World War II, Wolfers played a significant role in recruiting students into the intelligence services such as the OSS, and overall a disproportionate number of intelligence workers came from Pierson College. In addition to Wolfers, other Pierson fellows who did recruiting included Wallace Notestein and C. Bradford Welles. Pierson College residents who later became intelligence figures included future CIA counterintelligence chief James Jesus Angleton, who often spent time in Wolfers' living room listening to poets such as Robert Frost that Wolfers brought in to read. Other attendees to these sessions included a future U.S. Poet Laureate, Reed Whittemore.

In 2004, Yale completed a year long renovation of Pierson as part of a campaign to rehabilitate all twelve colleges. Major changes included the reconfiguration of existing suites and rooms, the move of the "Dean's" office, the addition of a new residential building, Upper Court. Most significantly, the renovation joined the basements of Pierson its adjacent and rival residential college, Davenport, giving the colleges common facilities.

The courtyard was home to George Rickey's kinetic sculpture, "Two Planes Vertical—Horizontal II" for many years, but the sculpture has now been moved to the courtyard of the Yale University Art Gallery.

== Namesake ==
Abraham Pierson was born in Southampton, Long Island in 1646 and was an early student at Harvard College. After many years as a Congregational minister in Newark, New Jersey, he assumed the pulpit in Killingworth, Connecticut in 1694. While presiding there, he and five other ministers established the third college in the American colonies, the Collegiate School, in 1701. Pierson was elected its first rector, but unable to leave his position in Killingworth, he taught courses from his parsonage in present-day Clinton. Pierson died in his sixth year as Yale's rector, in 1707.

A statue of Pierson stands on Yale's Old Campus. Since there are no known portraits of Pierson, the statue is an "imaginative recreation."

== Student life ==
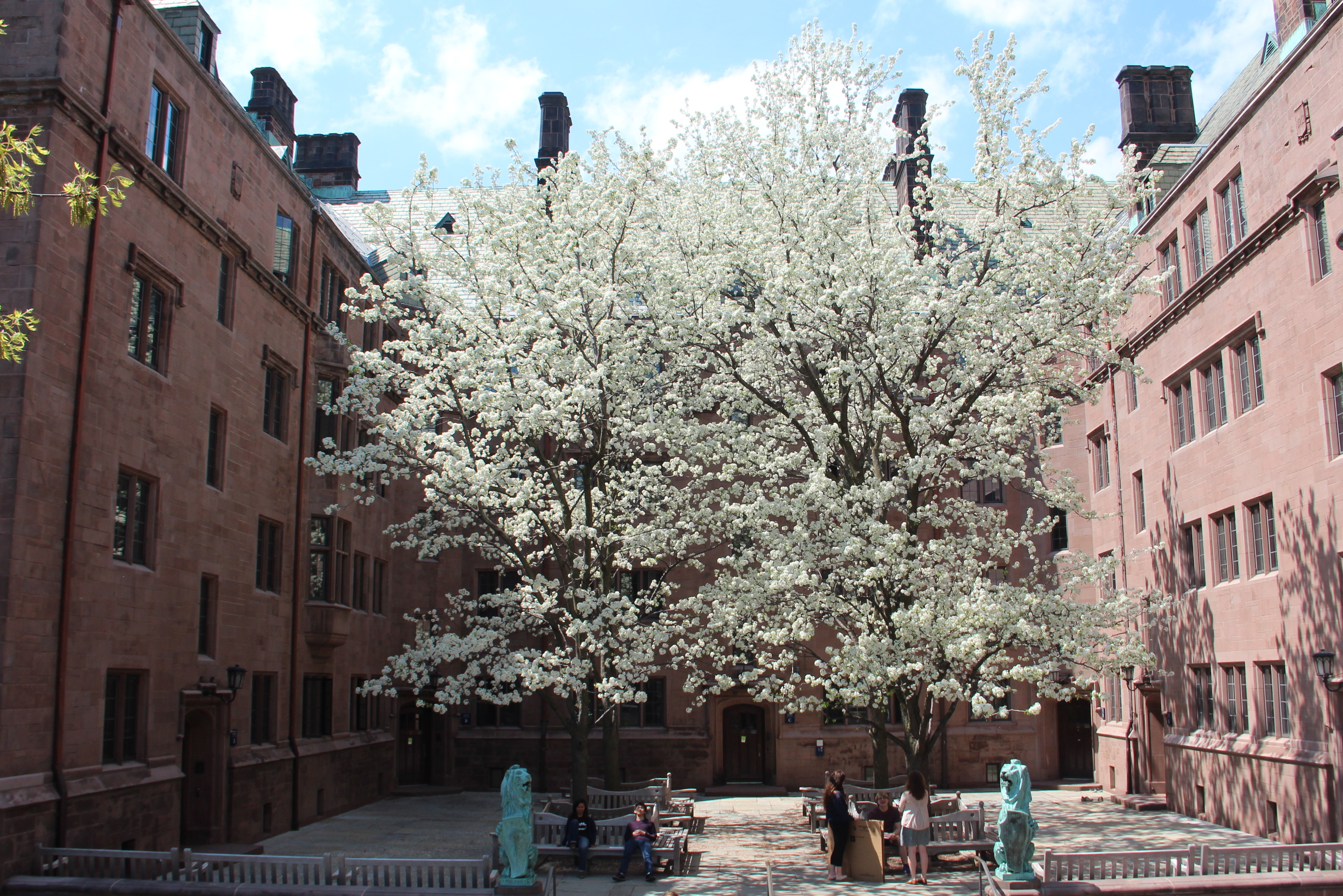
Lanman-Wright Hall

Pierson freshmen are currently housed in Vanderbilt Hall on Old Campus.

Pierson has been traditionally renowned for its thriving social life and once had the reputation of consistently trailing other Yale residential colleges in academic rankings. In fact, Pierson's rallying cry at one time was, "Tyng, Tang, and GPA," reflecting Pierson's reputation for winning Yale intramural sports (Tyng), an annual drinking competition among the residential colleges (Tang), and having the lowest average GPA of all the residential colleges. In 2004, 2018, and 2021, however, Pierson has been awarded the Gimbel Cup for highest average GPA at Yale. In light of new Connecticut alcohol laws, Dean Amerigo Fabbri has cracked down on events such as Tuesday Night Club (TNC), founded in 1981, restricting the event to Pierson seniors. However, in 2006, Pierson students were able to organize a successful Inferno, the traditional Pierson Halloween party. TNC was traditionally held in the "Lower Courtyard" of Pierson. Lower Courtyard housing is generally occupied by seniors.

Another Pierson tradition is Pierson Day, which typically falls on the last day of classes of the academic year. On Pierson Day, the Head of Pierson College wrestles another College Head, student, or other willing opponent in a ring filled with yellow jello.

Pierson achieved world renown in 1977 as a result of a television broadcast of its Bladderball 'victory'. One of Pierson's storied traditions is the theft of Davenport College's gnome mascot. Pierson's "fight song," heard annually at "the Game" between the Yale and Harvard football teams, starts off with: "'P' is for the 'P' in Pierson College; 'I' is for the 'I' in Pierson College," and continues in predictable fashion.

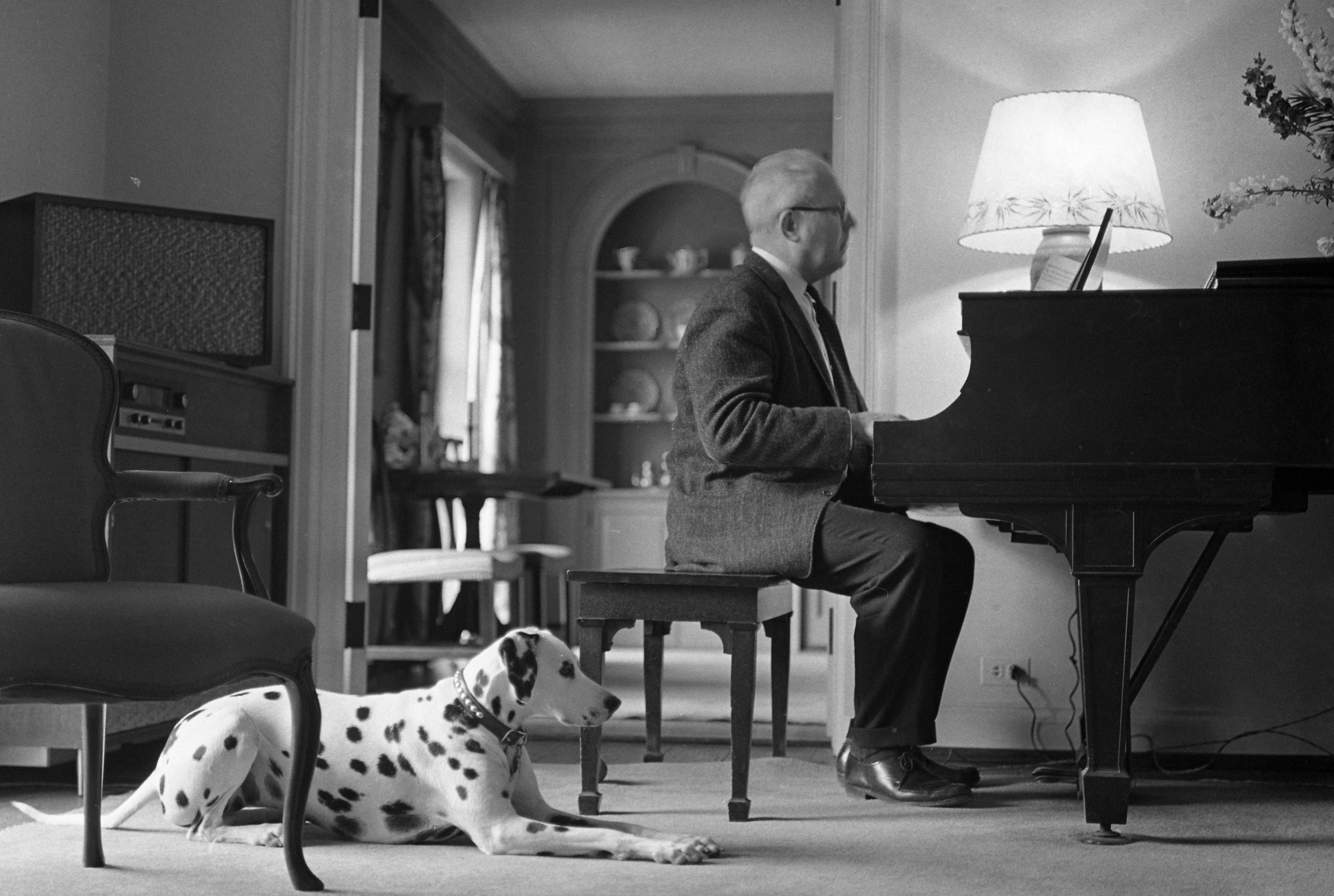
Quincy Porter at Pierson in 1961

Among the activities for which Pierson is known is the Pierson Press, one of the most active of Yale's many traditional letterpress print shops. It was founded over half a century ago and nurtured by a succession of Pierson Heads including John Hersey, Quincy Porter, Gaddis Smith, and Harvey Goldblatt. For many years the Press was located in a converted squash court in Pierson Tower, designed by Charles Willard Moore of the Yale School of Architecture. During the renovation of the college in 2004, it was relocated to enhanced facilities in the basement, where it now shares space with the Davenport Press in a greatly expanded Book Arts Center that includes half a dozen presses, over 1000 cases of hand type, a book bindery, paper mill and more. Over 75 Pierson and Davenport students attended the college's rigorous Apprentice Course during the Fall of 2005.

The basement of Pierson is also home to the Pierson Buttery. The Buttery is run by students and offers a variety of late night food options that can be ordered online. In the Spring of 2007, Pierson won the annual Freshmen Olympics, held on Old Campus. The Class of 2010 beat the eleven other residential colleges in Pierson's first ever Freshman Olympics victory. Since then, Pierson has won the Freshman Olympics several times, most recently in 2014.

Pierson's Fellowship, consisting of both faculty members and distinguished outside Associate Fellows, is one of the most active at Yale. The Fellows meet twice monthly during the academic year and support undergraduate activities in the college, including social events such as the annual Pierson Inferno at Halloween. Throughout its history, the group has consisted of a diverse range of members, including poet Robert Frost, actor George Takei, the mathematician G. D. Mostow, and NFL player Calvin Hill.

Pierson was home to one of the longest serving Yale residential college deans, Dean Christa Dove '76 MPhil. Within the Residential College system at Yale, deanships normally last only a few years. Dove, however, was Dean of Pierson College for 22 years, from 1983 to 2005.

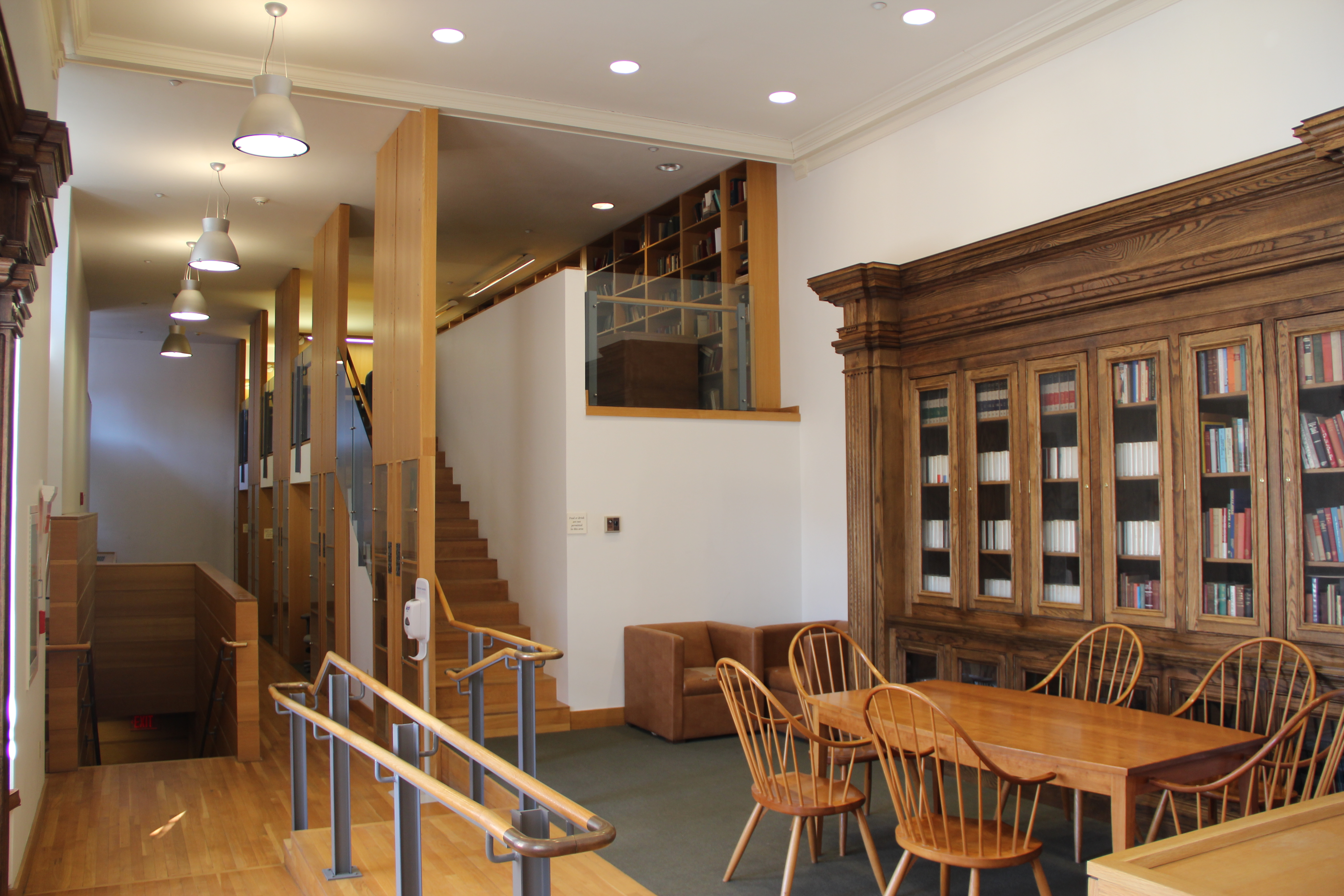
Pierson library after 2004 renovation

The renovation of 2003-04 was extensive, and included the reconfiguration of student suites, student activities areas, and dining facilities; new bathrooms, new interior finishes and lighting; additional student rooms in a new Upper Court building; complete replacement of all mechanical and electrical systems; new security, fire protection, and information technology systems; new elevators, ramps, and other enhancements to accessibility; and repairs to windows, masonry, roofs, and gutters. The renovation also included enlarging the library and adding a mezzanine level computer cluster. The completion of the additional building, called "Upper Court", increased Pierson College's dorm space capacity from 264 to 310. During the renovation, students who would otherwise live in Pierson College, lived in what is called "Swing Space," dormitories located near Payne Whitney Gymnasium that resemble a cheap hotel and do not include a dining hall.

A number of the songs from Dirty Projectors' Don Henley and Hernán Cortés infused glitch-opera, The Getty Address, were recorded in Pierson College, as Dave Longstreth was a student at Yale.

Pierson's sister college is Lowell House at Harvard University.

The inaugural Pierson College all-alumni reunion was held in New Haven from February 15–17, 2013, coinciding with the 80th year of the college's existence. Notable Pierson alumni in attendance included Howard Dean, PC '71, and George Pataki, PC '67. Also honored during the celebration were Head of College Harvey Goldblatt, who completed his 19th and final year as Head of Pierson College in May 2013, and Yale's then President-elect (now President) Peter Salovey.

== Notable alumni ==
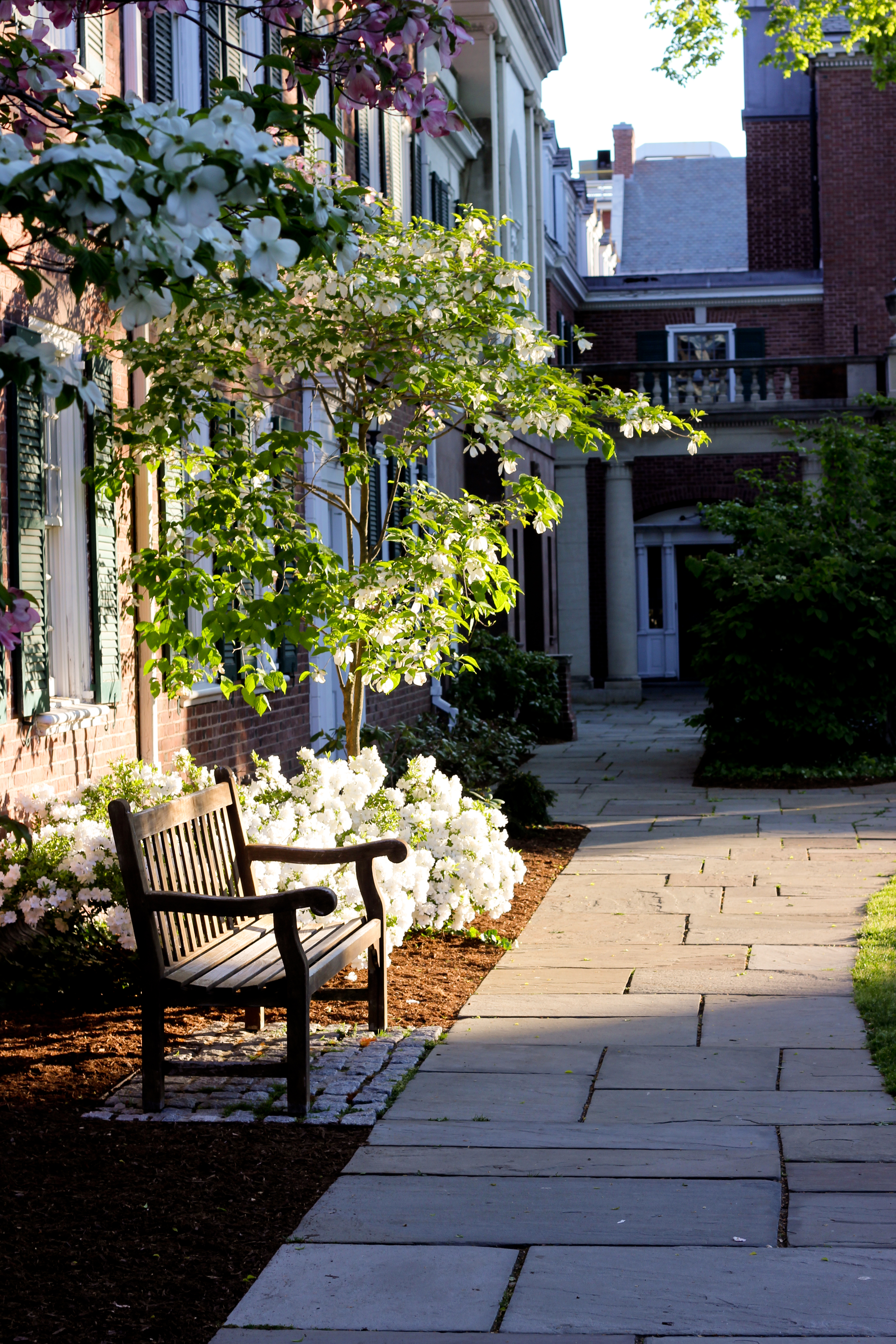
Pierson courtyard in spring

- Whitelaw Reid '34, American journalist who later served as editor, president and chairman of New York Herald Tribune
- Ogden Reid '49, publisher of the New York Herald Tribune, U.S. ambassador to Israel and a six-term United States representative
- John J. Maresca '59, Italian-American diplomat, business leader, and educator
- Jeffrey Loria '62, former managing partner of the Montreal Expos and current owner of the Florida Marlins
- George Pataki '67, former governor of New York
- Gene Siskel '67, film critic
- Richard Brodhead '68, former Dean of Yale College and former president of Duke University
- Tony Knowles '68, former governor of Alaska
- Calvin Hill '69, Yale running back and Dallas Cowboys running back
- Howard Dean '71, former governor of Vermont, former presidential candidate and former chairman of the Democratic National Committee
- Dick Jauron '73, Yale running back and former head coach of the Chicago Bears and Buffalo Bills, most recently defensive coordinator for the Cleveland Browns, although he is not currently coaching
- Jeffrey Bewkes '74, president and CEO of Time Warner
- David Leffell '77, internationally recognized dermatologist and Deputy Dean for Clinical Affairs at Yale School of Medicine
- Doug Wright, '85, playwright, author of the Pulitzer Prize–winning I am my Own Wife, as well as plays Quills and Gray Gardens
- Anne Applebaum '86, author and pundit, Pulitzer Prize–winning author of "Gulag: A History"
- Chris Dudley '87, NBA basketball player
- Tamar Gendler '87, Dean of the Faculty of Arts and Sciences, Yale University
- Paul Giamatti '89, Oscar-nominated actor, son of A. Bartlett Giamatti
- Joel Spolsky '91, software engineer, co-founder of Stack Overflow
- Jim Sciutto '92, senior foreign correspondent for ABC News
- Katherine Tai '96, 19th U.S Trade Representative
- Jaime Harrison '98, associate chair of the Democratic National Committee and 2020 candidate for U.S. Senate from South Carolina
- Sarah Stillman '06, award-winning investigative journalist and staff writer for The New Yorker
