= Bladderball =

Variant of pushball played at Yale University

Bladderball was a game traditionally played by students of Yale University, between 1954 and 1982, until being banned by the administration. The game is a variant of pushball, and has its roots in mob football. It was originally a competition between The Yale Banner, the Yale Daily News, campus humor magazine The Yale Record and campus radio station WYBC. Revival games were played in 2009 and 2011 and, very briefly, in 2014.

== History ==
According to Yale bladderball historian Sarah Hammond, bladderball was conceived by Yale student Philip Zeidman, owner of a six-foot leather exercise ball, as a preliminary event before Yale's 1954 college football game against Dartmouth. Hammond traces the name "bladderball" back to a rugby-like game played by Yale students on the New Haven Green in the first half of the 19th century, featuring an inflated animal bladder.

Once each year, at 11 a.m. the Saturday before the Yale–Dartmouth game, the inflatable six-foot ball was rolled through Yale's Phelps Gate onto Old Campus, where a throng of Yale students waited. At the sound of a whistle, teams from each residential college and various extracurricular organizations would fight for possession of the ball. Teams were allowed to use any means at their disposal to seize control. In 1975, the Jonathan Edwards College team attempted to capture the ball using a fishing gaff which predictably popped the ball, inciting enraged chants of "J.E. sucks!" from the other participants. The phrase "J.E. Sux" remains the unofficial motto of Jonathan Edwards College to this day.

In the absence of any scoring system, victory consisted of fervent declarations of victory by each team. Listeners to the Yale radio station, WYBC, would invariably learn that the station team had won a mighty victory, while readers of the Yale print media were invariably informed that each particular publication had bested all other teams handily, by scores often ranging into the thousands of points. In 1977, the Pierson College team literally took this to new heights, by chartering a helicopter (carrying not only the student team captain but also the Master of the College) to fly over the campus and drop leaflets saying "Surrender, Pierson has won!"; leaving nothing to chance, the Pierson team backed this claim up by chaining shut the doors of Branford College and Saybrook College, trapping the opposing teams inside. The crew in the helicopter filmed the entire event, created a news package "verifying" Pierson's victory, and brought the film to New Haven's WTNH-TV, which that evening broadcast the aerial footage, read the script as written by the stringers, and confirmed Pierson's "win" in the mainstream media.

In the 1960s, a new dimension was added to the game, as teams began to move the ball out of Old Campus and roll it through the New Haven streets to the Yale president's house on Hillhouse Avenue, while simultaneously protecting it from city police. As might be expected, the path taken by the ball under the influence of the myriad squads trying to seize possession was not direct; in 1971, the ball rolled a six-mile swath through downtown streets leaving massive traffic tangles in its wake, only to be trapped and deflated by police at Beinecke Plaza, a few blocks from its starting point.

Preparing for bladderball competition involved alcoholic beverage consumption; unfortunately, this resulted in an escalating series of bladderball-related antisocial activities. In 1976, a car and its driver were badly trampled by the mob of students chasing the ball over the top of the vehicle. The Branford College dining hall was vandalized by overzealous students from Saybrook College, who poured foul-smelling butyric acid mixed with food from the catwalk above the dining hall. Finally, in 1982, several participants were injured, and Yale University President A. Bartlett Giamatti declared bladderball's toll of minor injuries, property damage, and increasingly strange pranks too much to bear, and put an end to the tradition. The bladderball was rumored to be in the possession of the Yale Symphony Orchestra for some reason; it reappeared briefly in 1999 in the symphony's Halloween Show film Jane Bond, during a short Raiders of the Lost Ark sequence, playing the large boulder. It was subsequently under the control of the Yale Precision Marching Band which used it in the 2006 Princeton halftime show.

"The bladderball clearly incarnates the archetypal female form: the egg," wrote Yale student Jonathan Tucker in the 1977 Yale Banner. "Magically released from the fallopian tube-like tunnel of Phelps Gateway, it bounces rhythmically above the swarming hands of the crowd like a huge ripe ovum being battered by thousands of frantic spermatozoa. The accumulated libidinal energy aroused by the pre-game skirmishes (but largely repressed, because of homophobic anxiety) is immediately transferred onto the permitted female form of the bladderball."

== Revivals ==
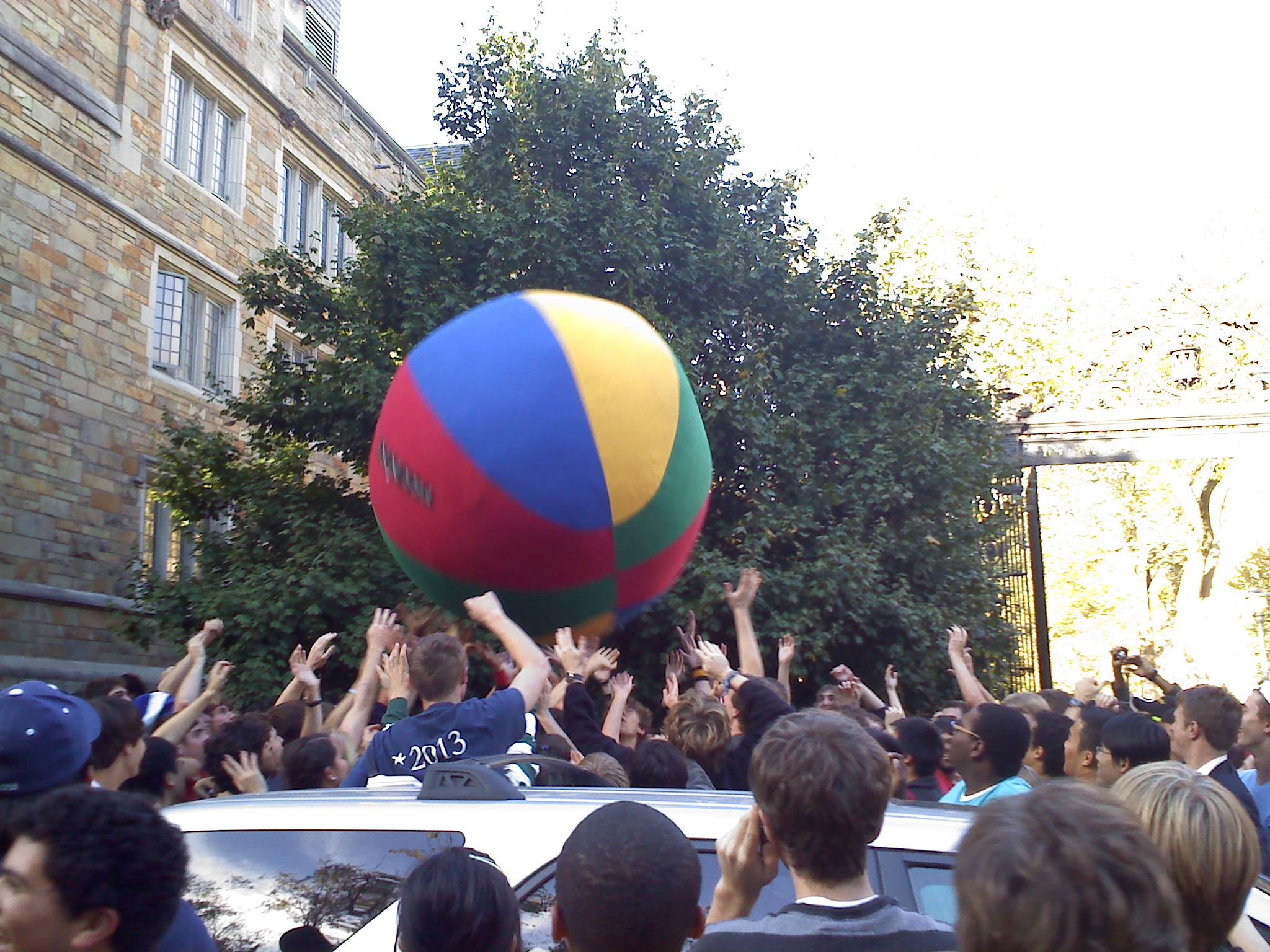
The 2009 Bladderball game approaches Berkeley College.

=== 2009 ===
Bladderball returned to Yale University on October 10, 2009 (the day of the Dartmouth game), despite the remaining ban. The ball appeared at Phelps Gate at approximately 4 p.m. and ended with the ball being popped on Cross Campus, at which point students descended on the ball to bring pieces back to their residential colleges. Police arrived during the game when it blocked traffic on Elm Street, though their involvement was limited to keeping the street clear.

=== 2011 ===
Bladderball returned again to Yale University on October 8, 2011, despite the remaining ban. The ball appeared at Dwight Hall at approximately 4:30 p.m. The ball was popped on High Street, but the game continued with students fighting over the deflated ball. Police arrived on the scene as the ball was travelling on Elm Street, and the game ended 11 minutes after it had begun, when police interfered because of traffic that it had caused on Elm Street. The ball was confiscated by the police, who threatened to arrest students who continued to hold on to it. At least one piece of the ball was retained by a student.

=== 2014 ===
Yale students attempted a return of Bladderball in 2014. The police learned of the planned proceedings, and patrolled the area in the minutes before the planned start. The Bladderball entered from a Farnam Hall entryway and rolled in front of Durfee Hall. Within a minute, Yale Police had deflated the Bladderball, ending the game.
