= Davenport College =

Residential college of Yale University

- Residential college at Yale University
- Yale University
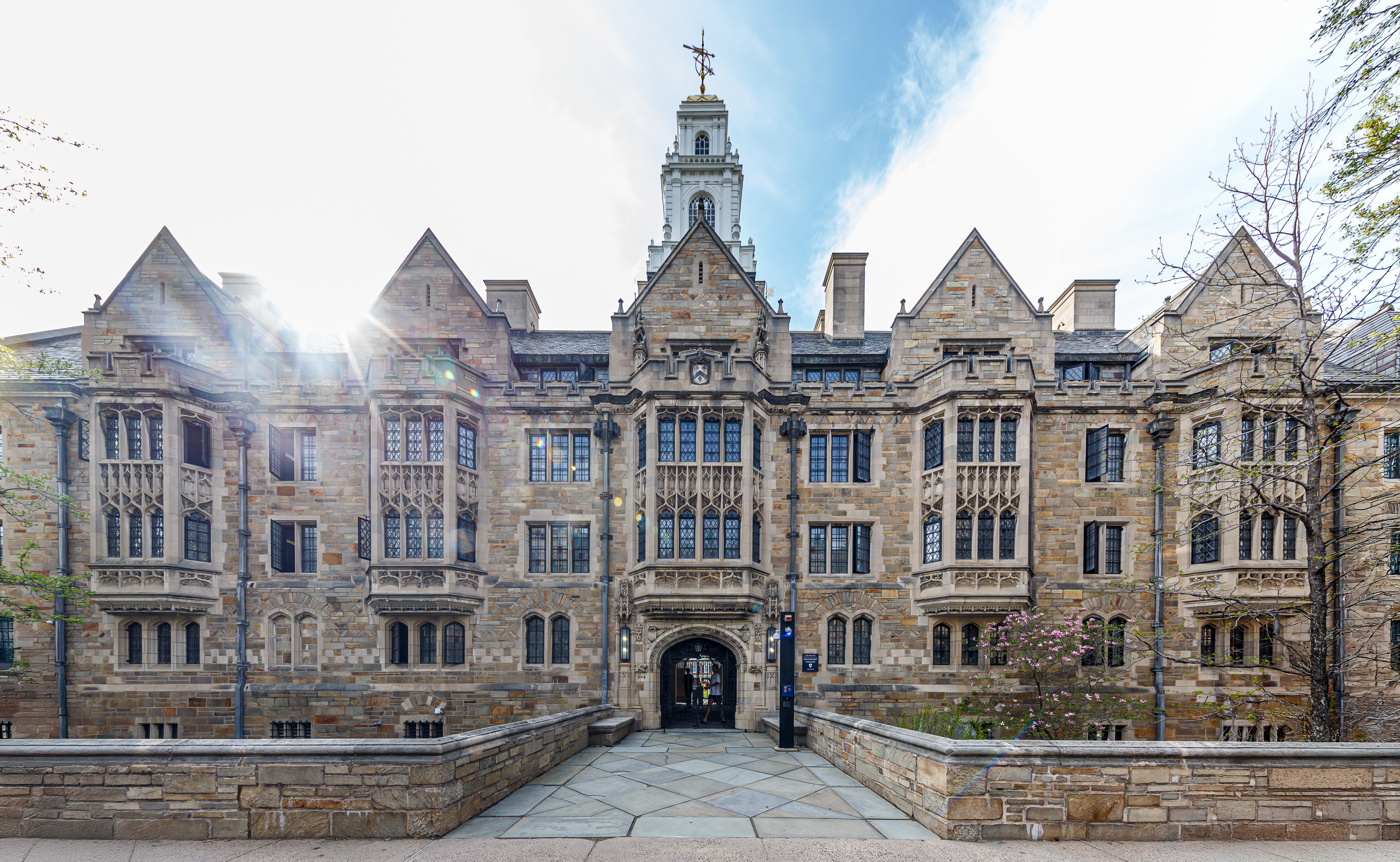
- York Street's gothic façade

- Location: 248 York Street
- Coordinates: 41.31037°N 72.93094°W
- Nickname: D'port
- Motto: Camera principis, mare liberum. (Latin)
- Motto in English: House of a leader, a free sea.
- Established: 1933
- Named for: John Davenport
- Colors: black, white, maroon
- Sister college: Winthrop House, Harvard
- Head: Anjelica Gonzalez
- Dean: Adam Ployd
- Undergraduates: 477 (2013–2014)
- Mascot: Gnome
- Website: davenport.yalecollege.yale.edu

Davenport College (colloquially referred to as D'port) is one of the fourteen residential colleges of Yale University. Its buildings were completed in 1933 mainly in the Georgian style but with a gothic façade along York Street. The college was named for John Davenport, who founded Yale's home city of New Haven, Connecticut. An extensive renovation of the college's buildings occurred during the 2004–2005 academic year as part of Yale's comprehensive building renovation project. Davenport College has an unofficial rivalry with adjoining Pierson College.

== Namesake ==
John Davenport was born in 1597 to draper and Mayor of Coventry Henry Davenport and Winifred Barnaby. He attended Oxford University for three years starting in 1613 before leaving without a degree. He returned to Oxford to finish his MA and Bachelor of Divinity after serving as the chaplain of Hilton Castle and vicar of St. Stephen's Church in London. In 1633 he resigned from the Church of England after several disputes with the senior clergy.

In 1638 he sailed to North America with his congregation and a patent for a colony in Massachusetts. One year later he co-founded the city of New Haven with Theophilus Eaton and served as its burgess until his departure to Boston 30 years later. Beginning in the 1640s, Davenport advocated for the creation of a college near the New Haven Green, a vision realized by Yale College some fifty years after his death. He is also credited with co-founding the nearby Hopkins School.

In 1668, Davenport left New Haven to serve as the pastor of the First Church in Boston. His invitation to that position was not without opposition due to his strict Puritan values, especially regarding infant baptism. Davenport died of apoplexy less than two years later.

== Buildings and architecture ==
=== The College ===
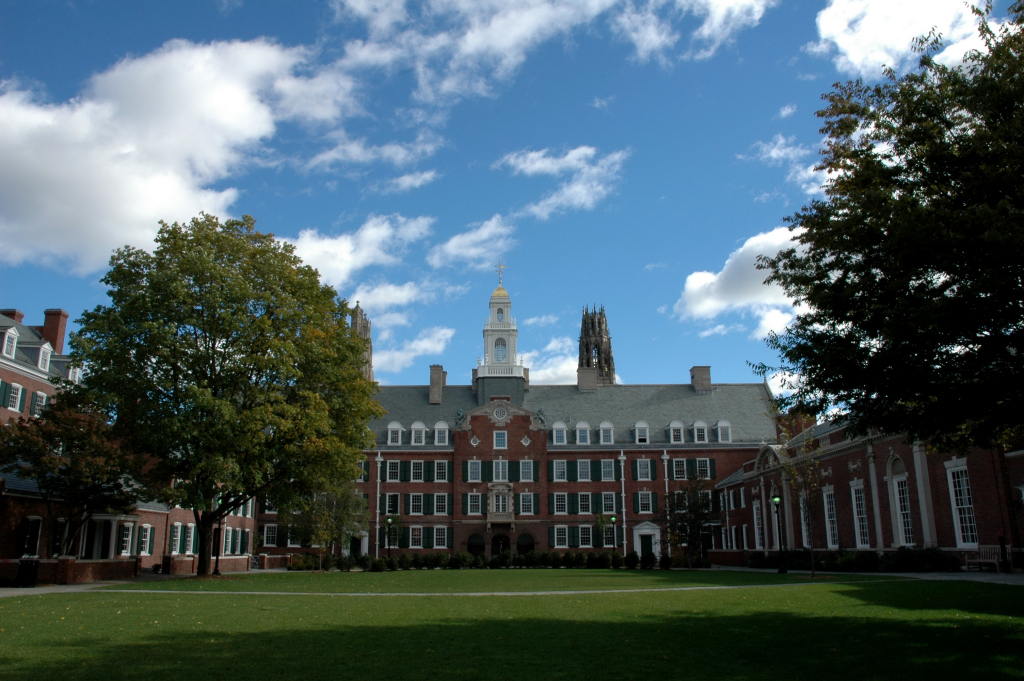
Upper Courtyard viewed from the Crosspiece. Harkness Tower can be seen in the background

Davenport College was, like many of Yale's residential colleges, designed by James Gamble Rogers. It has two distinct styles of architecture: the York Street facade is constructed from gothically-detailed sandstone while the remainder of the college has been built in the red-brick Georgian style of the colonial era. This "hybridization" is meant to complement the monumental gothic streetscape of York Street, on which the western façades of the Branford and Saybrook College complex along with Jonathan Edwards College stand opposite the gothic-inspired Yale Daily News building and University Theater. On the inner, Georgian face, the college entrance has an adaptation of the eastern façade of the original Massachusetts Statehouse, in which the British imperial lion and unicorn have been replaced by a pair of yales. The inner face was featured in the 2008 movie The Sisterhood of the Traveling Pants 2.

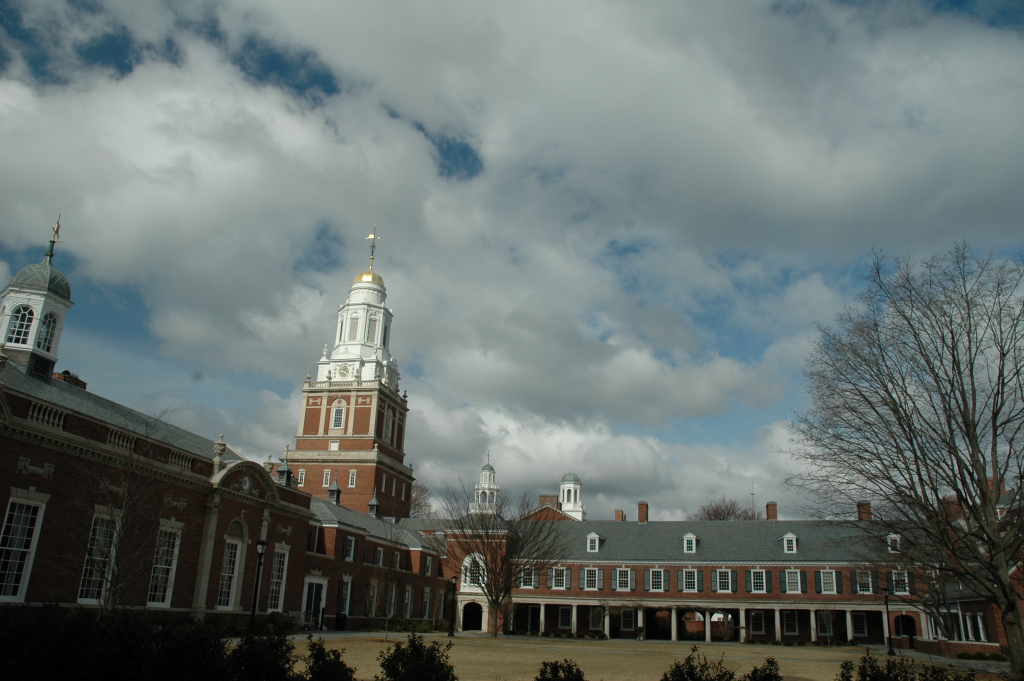
Davenport College, Upper Courtyard viewed from York St. Gate.

The enclosed space of Davenport College features three courtyards: Kumble Court (usually referred to as the "upper courtyard"), the lower courtyard and a recently created stone courtyard in front of the dean's suite, the result of the annexation of the former Yale Record building during the 2004–2005 renovations. A half-story terrace and two house-like residential units (one dubbed "The Cottage") flank the upper courtyard to the north. Traditionally, the college's sophomores live in the suites bordering the lower courtyard, while most of the juniors and seniors of the College live around the upper courtyard.

Separating the two main courtyards is the Crosspiece, housing both the Dean's and Head's Offices and a classroom space as well as carrels and reading rooms extending from the college's Spitzer Library. The Crosspiece formerly held a second library in the top floor which has since been converted to student housing, with the book holdings moved into the expanded Library. Indoor spaces of architectural note include the Davenport Common Room, the aforementioned Spitzer Library and the Dining Hall. The Dining Hall's walls are adorned with a two-panel portrait showcasing the diversity of the college's staff and students. A Waterford crystal chandelier hangs from the dining hall's ceiling.

The student buttery, or "The Dive", is the snack shop. An entertainment center—and game room is nearby. The Davenport basement also includes a letterpress print-shop, a pottery studio, a digital media arts center, a dance studio, and a small theater with stadium seating. These are all shared with students in Pierson. Davenport students also have access to shared facilities on the Pierson side of the basement, including music practice rooms and an exercise room containing treadmills, ellipticals, and free weights.

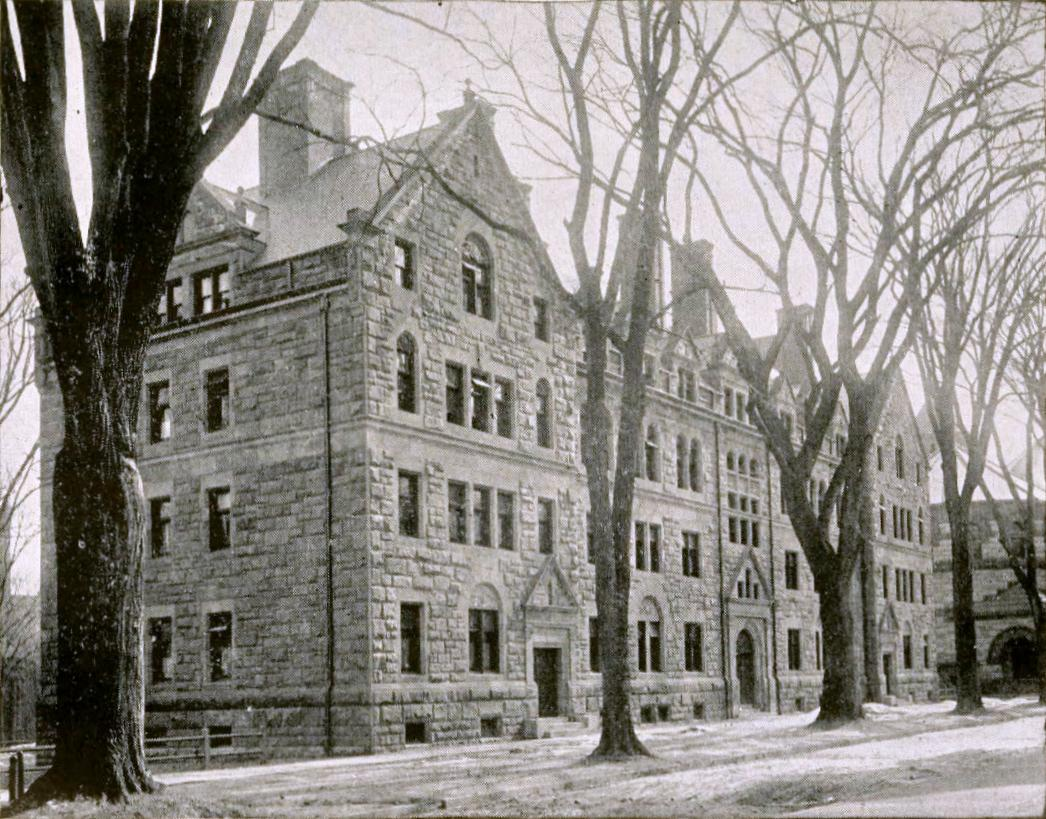
Welch Hall circa 1895. Until 2024, Davenport freshmen lived in Welch. From Yale Yarns: Sketches of Life at Yale University by John Seymour Wood. (New York: The Knickerbocker Press, 1895.)

=== Freshman housing ===
Davenport College freshmen live on the Old Campus with the rest of their Yale College class, with the exception of students from Silliman, Timothy Dwight, Pauli Murray, and Benjamin Franklin. Currently, Davenport College, along with Grace Hopper College freshmen live in Lanman Wright Hall, also known as "LDub", which is located next to Daniels Gate on Elm Street. Lanman Wright is known for being the "worst accommodation at Yale", with cramped bunk beds and tight living quarters being the norm.

== History ==
Under the Yale College policy that let incoming students express a residential college preference, Davenport developed a reputation for attracting athletic, upper-class elites until the policy ended with the class of 1958.

In 2022, Gonzalez succeeded John Fabian Witt as head of Davenport College, making her the first Black woman to serve as head of college in Yale's history.

== Mascot ==
For a while after Davenport College's inception into the Yale residential college system, students were known as "Hybrids," a reference to the hybrid style of the college's architecture. While the nickname appeared in a few official publications in the 1970s, it was no longer used by either Davenporters or their rivals. Davenport students were without a title or figure to rally behind.

In 1998, then junior Thomas Shaw, upon returning from a semester of mountaineering, brought back from the California Redwood country a five-and-a-half foot tall, 400 pound carved wooden gnome as a gift to the college. The gnome, with its green painted shirt and yellow pants, quickly developed a following in the Davenport community, and was soon proudly adopted as the college's official mascot.

The gnome was first placed in the college's courtyard, but after repeated theft by neighbor and unofficial Davenport rival Pierson, the gnome was relocated inside. It was in the entrance of the administrative offices in Crosspiece for the first semester of the 2005–2006 school year, but was moved to the Davenport Dining Hall. In April 2011, Davenport students stopped a group of Piersonites from the most recent attempt at stealing the gnome. The gnome was successfully rescued and taken to its home in the Davenport Dining Hall.

== Intramurals ==
Davenport College has competed for the Tyng Cup, winning the championship six times, most recently in 2014. The college's ice hockey team has won 16 championships, most recently in 1997. Davenport has won championships in table tennis, golf, bowling, men's volleyball, swimming, softball, and track and field.

== Notable alumni ==
- Sherrod Brown, 1974, United States Senator (D-Ohio)
- Barbara Bush, daughter of President George W. Bush
- George H. W. Bush, 1948, 41st President of the United States
- George W. Bush, 1968, 43rd President of the United States
- William F. Buckley, Jr., prominent conservative columnist, founder of the National Review
- Ben Carson, 1973, neurosurgeon, 2016 Republican presidential candidate, former Secretary of U.S. Department of Housing and Urban Development
- Michael Gerber, humorist and author
- Jonathan Haidt, social psychologist and author
- Rashid Khalidi, Palestinian-American academic and diplomat
- Michael J. Knowles, 2012, conservative political commentator, author, and media host
- Sarah Lyall, London correspondent for The New York Times
- Robert K. Massie, historian, winner of 1981 Pulitzer Prize in biography
- Jefferson Mays, Tony Award-winning actor
- David McCullough, American historian and best-selling author
- Edwin Meese, 75th Attorney General of the United States
- Karen Narasaki, a civil rights leader and a Commissioner on the United States Commission on Civil Rights
- John D. Negroponte, 1960, former ambassador to Honduras and Iraq, and former permanent representative to the United Nations
- Samantha Power, United States Ambassador to the United Nations
- Clark T. Randt, Jr., the longest-serving United States Ambassador to China
- Kurt Schmoke, Dean of Howard University Law School, former mayor of Baltimore, and former Senior Fellow of Yale University
- Stephen Schwarzman, 1969, investor and founder of The Blackstone Group
- Ari Shapiro, 2000, an American radio journalist
- Garry Trudeau, artist/writer of Doonesbury comic strip
- Thornton Wilder, American playwright and novelist
