= Pushball =

Ball game

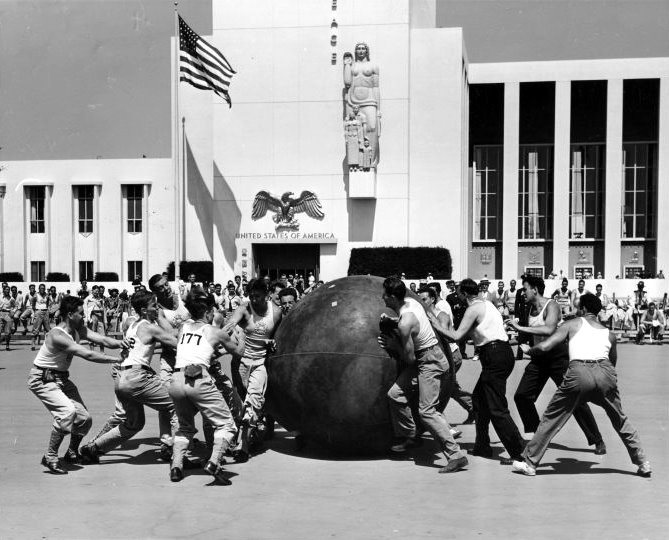
Pushball game between New York Police and Fire Departments, 1939

Pushball is a game played by two sides on a field usually 140 yards (130 m) long and 50 yards (46 m) wide, with a ball 6 feet (1.8 m) in diameter and 50 pounds (23 kg) in weight. Occasionally, much heavier balls were used. The sides usually number eleven each, there being five forwards, two left-wings, two right-wings and two goal-keepers. The goals consist of two upright posts 18 feet (5.5 m) high and 20 feet (6.1 m) apart with a crossbar 7 feet (2.1 m) from the ground. The game lasts for two periods with an intermission. Pushing the ball under the bar counts 5 points; lifting or throwing it over the bar counts 8. A touchdown behind goal for safety counts 2 to the attacking side.

A pushball game in Volendam, Netherlands in 1927

The game was invented by M. G. Crane of Newton, Massachusetts, in 1891, and was taken up at Harvard University the next year, but never attained any considerable vogue. Macalester College has played pushball since 1914, traditionally involving both students and faculty. Emory University students played pushball from 1923 to 1955 before the game was retired due to its increasingly rough nature.

In the United Kingdom the first regular game was played at The Crystal Palace in 1902 by teams of eight. The English rules are somewhat different from those obtaining in the United States. Pushball on horseback was introduced in 1902 at Durlands Riding Academy in New York, and has been played in England at the Royal Tournament.

"Pushball on horseback" variations continued in Europe, and recently resurfaced as a growing equine activity in the United States, with variations including "horse soccer", "equine soccer", and "hoofball". The various games provide great fun for both horse and rider, while serving as a valuable training tool that can be enjoyed by one or more horsemanship team players. The most important safety factor (aside from basic horsemanship foundation and equine communication skills) requires that the ball be at least as tall as the mount's breastbone. Some play with a durable 48-inch-diameter (1,200 mm) cageball – a tough bladder caged inside a separate nylon cover, available from sporting goods suppliers.

A description of the rules can be found in the Spalding book Push Ball: History and Description of the Game, with the Official Playing Rules published in 1903 by Spalding's Athletic Library.

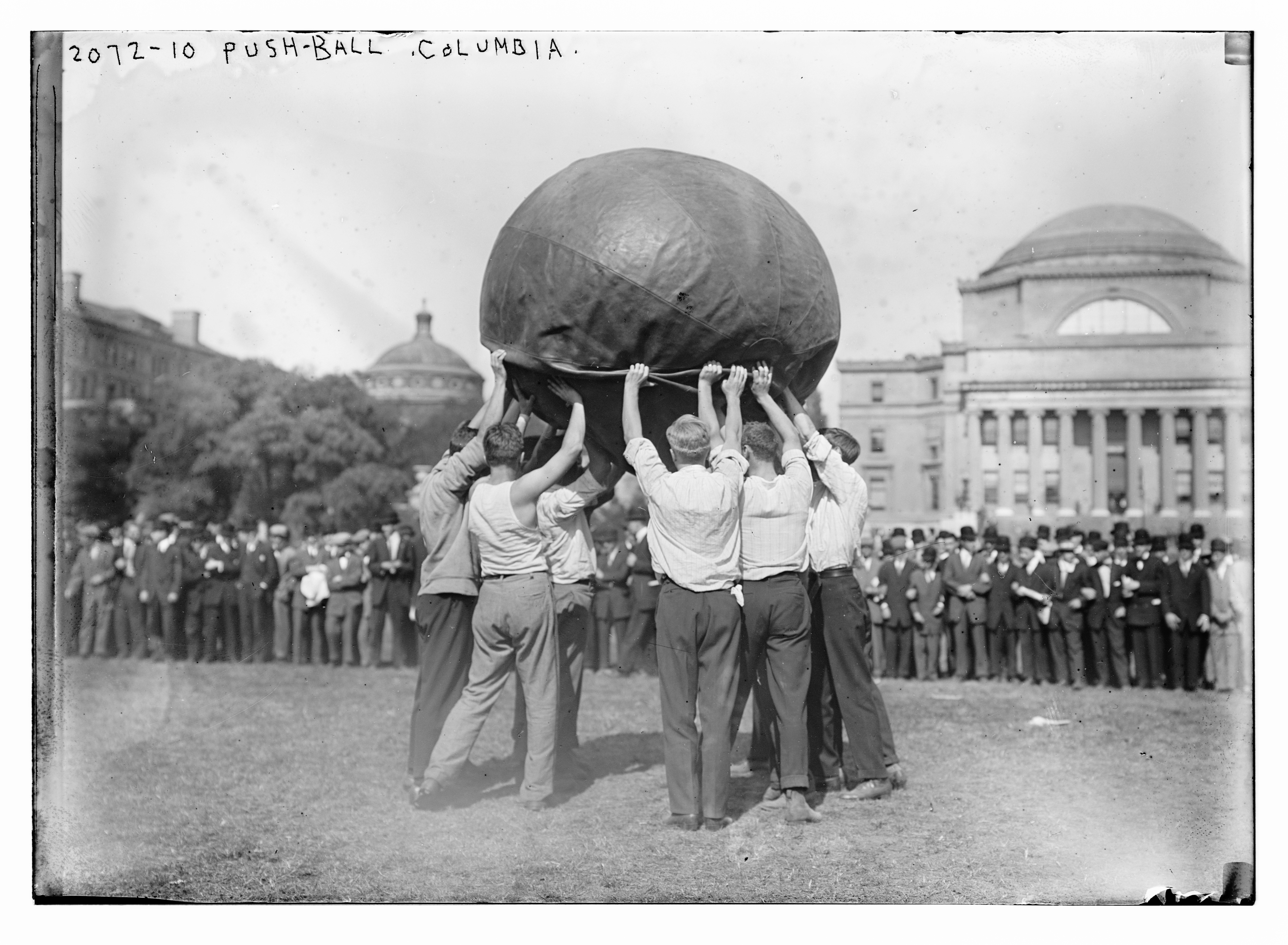
Columbia University, 1910

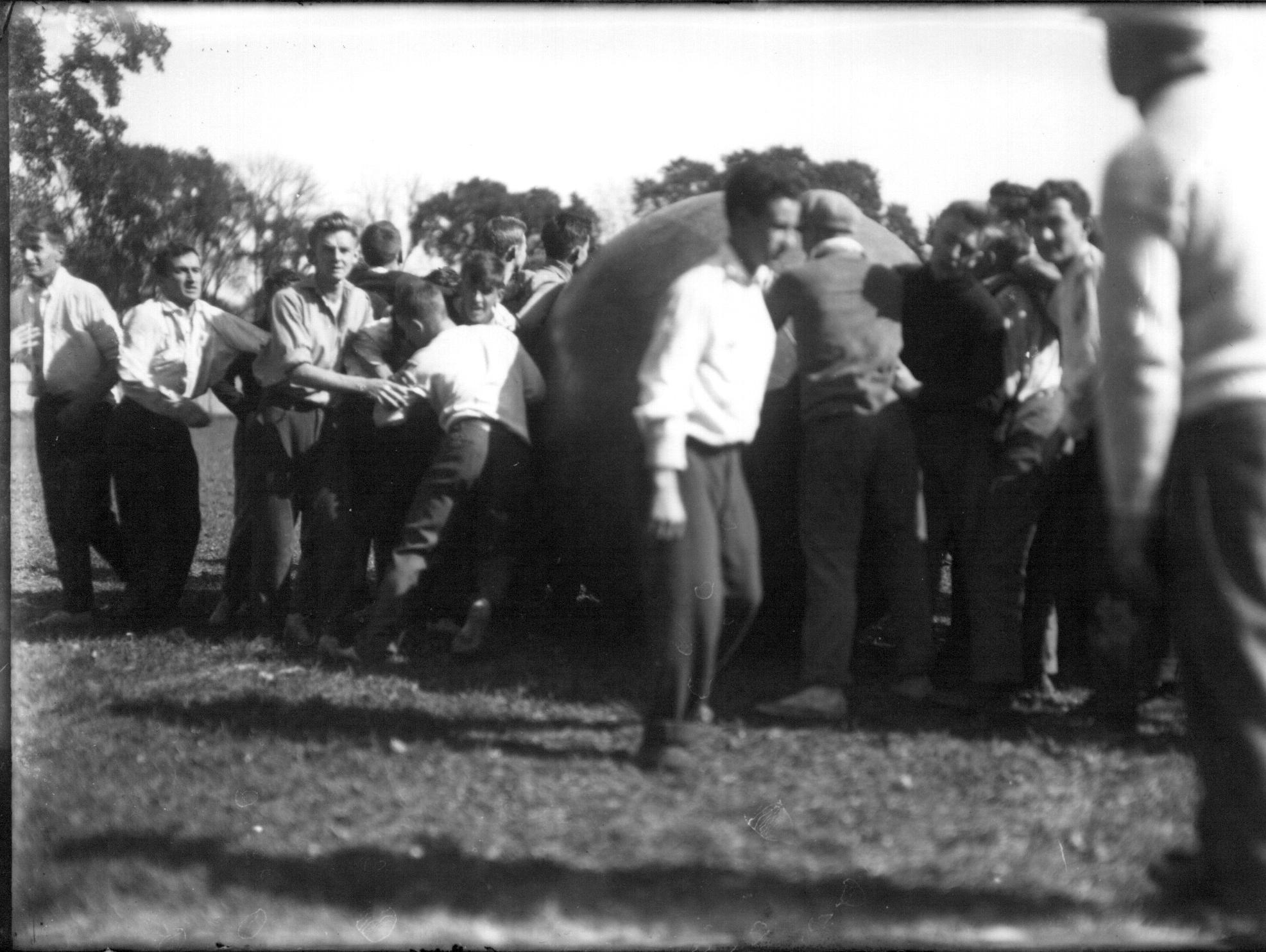
Miami University, 1911

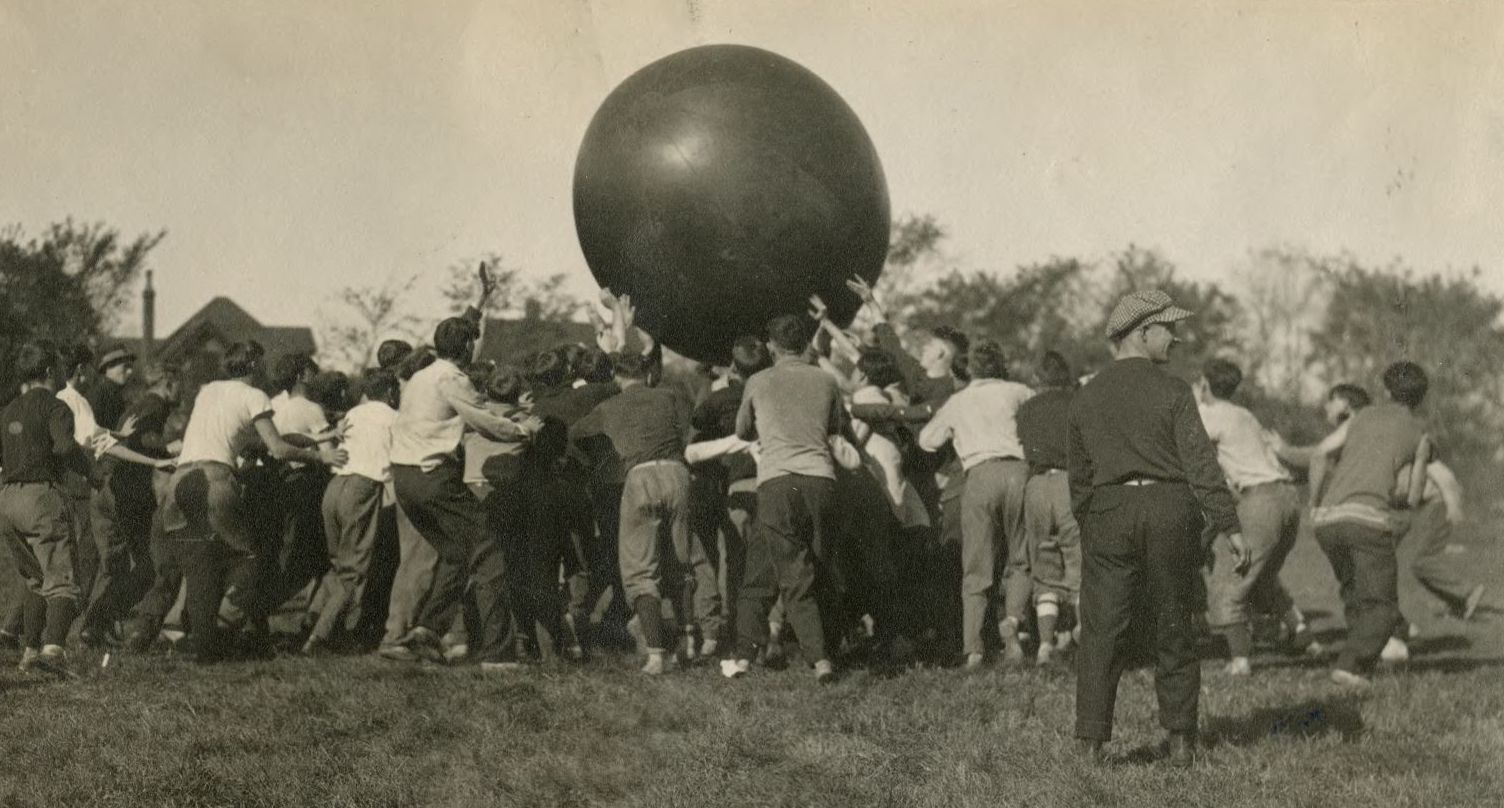
Macalester College, 1914

== See also ==
- Bladderball
