= Immunoengineering =

Immunoengineering is a broad field that encompasses immunotherapy, immunoediting, and immunomodulation. The common thread between sub-fields of immunoengineering is that the immune system is the key to the target treatment. There are two main ways immunoengineering is approached: taking advantage of how the immune system already works, or tweaking its processes to suit a certain situation.

Within immunoengineering, immunotherapy refers to any cancer treatment meant to help the immune system recognize or attack cancer cells. Immunoediting refers to the human body's tumor suppression mechanism. While it is often used in the context of cancer treatment, it can be applied to other diseases as well.

Immunoengineering leverages neurostimulation techniques to interface with the nervous system and modulate immune cell activity. The central and autonomic nervous systems are critical mediators of physiological homeostasis; consequently, maladaptive disruptions within these regulatory circuits frequently underlie the pathobiology of chronic inflammatory, autoimmune, and metabolic disorders. Accumulating evidence demonstrates that neurostimulation modalities targeting distinct central nervous system (CNS) structures and peripheral neural pathways can effectively mitigate these homeostatic disruptions by suppressing pro-inflammatory cytokine cascades and correcting systemic dysregulation. This approach is designed for stand-alone therapeutic interventions and adjunctive therapies without the worry of drug interactions.

Immunomodulation is a broad term referring to any substance used to heighten or suppress immune system function.

== Immunoediting ==
Immunoediting, specifically in the context for cancer treatment, is the process which involves immune cells manipulating the immune response that developing tumors may invoke. The ability to edit the immune response invoked by developing tumors has been experimented and concluded to be an ability capable of innate immunity to some extent, and further enhanced by the presence of adaptive immunity. Immunoediting, primarily discussed within the context of cancer, occurs through three phases that may be known as elimination, equilibrium, and escape. Within HIV, a selection for mutations experienced by HIV-infected cells allows for escape from an immune response made to eliminate the infected cell, similar to how some tumors escape the immune response within cancer immunoediting. The selection experienced within HIV is one in which infected cells demonstrating viral latency may have been selected for the resistance to elimination from corresponding T cells. COVID-19 is additionally stated to have developed immune evasion mechanisms that allow for COVID-19 symptoms to persist within individuals. Such mechanisms are stated to be potentially attributed to the pressures that are selected for by the immunoediting response that may occur between the immune system and the Covid-19 virus. It is these mechanisms that involve making the virus invisible to the immune system or locating the virus in an anatomical area inaccessible to the immune cells meant to eliminate the virus, similar to how cancer cells persist within cancer immunoediting.

=== Autoimmune disorders ===
Autoimmune disorders are defined as conditions where the adaptive immune system mistakenly attacks healthy tissue, mounting an immune response. There are over 100 types of autoimmune disorders that affect 3-5% of the global population. Treatments for autoimmune disorders, if present, rely on the use of immunosuppressive drugs, broadly reducing immune system activity which are not curative measures and increase susceptibility to infection. Immunoengineering is an approach that is being investigated as a form of targeted treatment for autoimmune disorders.

==== Engineered CAR-T cell therapies ====
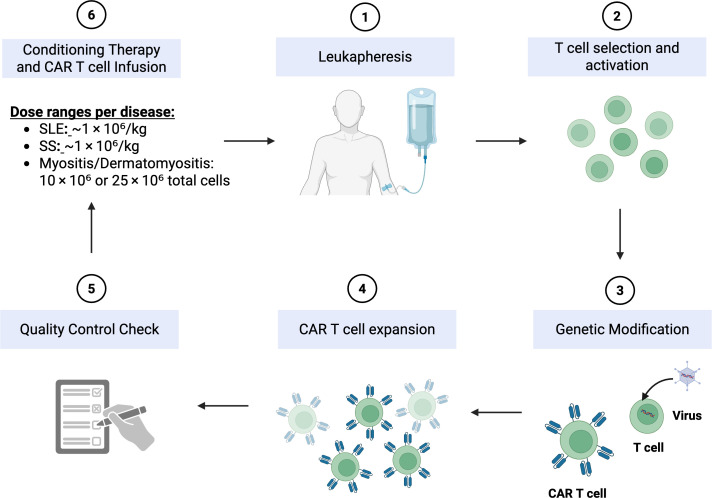
Schematic of the CAR T cell production model.

Chimeric antigen receptor T (CAR T) cell therapies, originally developed for the treatment of blood cancers, have been studied as pre-clinical models for the treatment of autoimmune disorders. CAR T cells are autologous T lymphocytes harvested from the patient and are genetically engineered to target specific disease-causing cells.

B lymphocytes are a common target for CAR T cell therapy because they produce antibodies that cause tissue damage. Early clinical trials have shown that CAR T cell mediated B lymphocyte depletion has resulted in remission of life-long autoimmune diseases. In systemic Lupus Erythematosus (SLE), inflammatory tissue damage is driven by autoreactive B cells that target the body's own cells. Clinical studies have demonstrated the depletion of B lymphocytes using CD19-directed CAR T cell therapies to produce meaningful remission of SLE.

Type 1 diabetes (T1D) is one of the most prevalent autoimmune disorders, affecting 9.5 million people globally as of 2025. T1D occurs when the immune system attacks and destroys the insulin-producing beta cells within the pancreas. While the current standard treatment for T1D is insulin replacement therapy, CAR T cell therapies as preclinical models are being designed to recognize pancreatic beta cells and release anti-inflammatory cytokines to suppress unwanted autoimmune response.

==== Immunoediting approaches for type 1 diabetes ====
A developing method is the transplantation of pancreatic islet cells, which requires the subsequent use of immunosuppressive drugs to prevent transplantation rejection. Immunoengineering therapies for T1D focus on protection of the transplanted islet cells using encapsulation, shielding the transplanted cell from the body's immune system while allowing for the passage of insulin and nutrients. Biomaterials are also designed to locally deliver immunomodulatory agents to specifically target immune response at the site of beta islet transplantation. While successful in small animal models, limitations such as fibrotic overgrowth and minimal graft stability remain barriers to the large animal clinical implementation of this method.

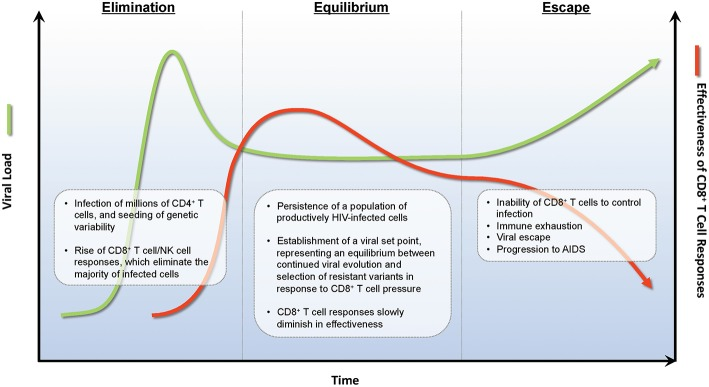
The immunoediting phases of an infection. The elimination phase describes a rise in infected CD4+T cells that cause a rise in CD8+T cell responses which eliminate many CD4+T cells until an equilibrium point, leading into infected cells to escape.

=== Reverse immunoediting ===
The idea of a tumor morphing the immune response of an individual is known as reverse immunoediting. A tumor treatment approach that considers said idea is that of a tumor-activated and optically reinforced immunoscaffold, known as TURN. It is constructed to manipulate the phases of cancer immunoediting and allow for more effective treatment against the tumor. This effective treatment firstly involves the release of proteins that work to weaken the cells and cytokines of the tumor that are responsible for the immunosuppression of the tumor that works against the body's natural immune system response. Agents of TURN are then activated with a laser which triggers the tumor to expose its antigens, allowing for the T-cells to invade the tumor. CD137 agonists from the scaffold work to promote the work done from the T-cells attacking the tumor through improved efficiency of T-cells through survival, function, and proliferation. Another approach relevant to reverse immunoediting is that of using low-dose decitabine in mice. Tumors influence the immune response of the body by DNA methylation, repressing immune genes. This repression is reversed in mice by inhibiting DNA methylation through low-dose decitabine. Both approaches consider how tumors influence the immune response of the host and work to reverse such influences.

== Tissue engineering ==
The role of immunoengineering in the realm of tissue engineering stems from the need to combat undesirable effects, such as rejection and inflammation, that result from introducing non-native biomaterials ranging from biological macromolecules to fully synthetic coatings, transplantation of non-native materials in procedures such as solid organ transplantation and vascularized composite allotransplantation, or the use of internal medical devices. Additionally, as of the early 2010s, there was an uptick in research involving the possibility of altering the immune system for the purpose of inducing tissue regeneration and repair when solid organ transplantation or vascularized composite allotransplantation is not feasible. Procedures of this sort involve the introduction of material that is known as exogenous, or non-autologous, material. Due to the nature of the material, an immune response can be induced, which alerts the body to break down or dispel the foreign material, leading to pain, redness, and swelling, based on markers on the body of the exogenous cells, known as antigens, the shape and size of the molecules comprising the material, or foreign proteins from the material that interact with the host's immune system.

The main method of preventing these side effects is known as immunosuppression therapy, which involves providing the patient with a mixture of multiple drugs for the purpose of preventing the immune system from inducing inflammatory responses at the transplantation site. Each drug is specialized to target specific immunologic pathways depending on the procedure conducted and the biomaterial introduced. Most therapies are required to continue on for the person's lifetime, usually leading to adverse side effects or the risk of rejection if the drugs are not consistently administered. In most cases, systemic side effects of immunosuppressive therapies include metabolic disorders, infections, cancer, pancreatic toxicity, post-transplant diabetes, cytomegalovirus, and fungal infections due to the patient's immune system being shut down as a whole. Because of this, more precise immunoregulatory practices or alternatives to immunosuppression altogether, are highly sought after. Currently, a few alternatives that exist include the use of cell therapy, amniotic epithelial stem cells, neutrophil activation, macrophage polarization, Th1 to Th2 lymphocyte switching, pro- and anti-inflammatory cytokine regulation, and regulatory T cell induction.

=== Alternatives to immunosuppression ===
==== Cellular therapy ====
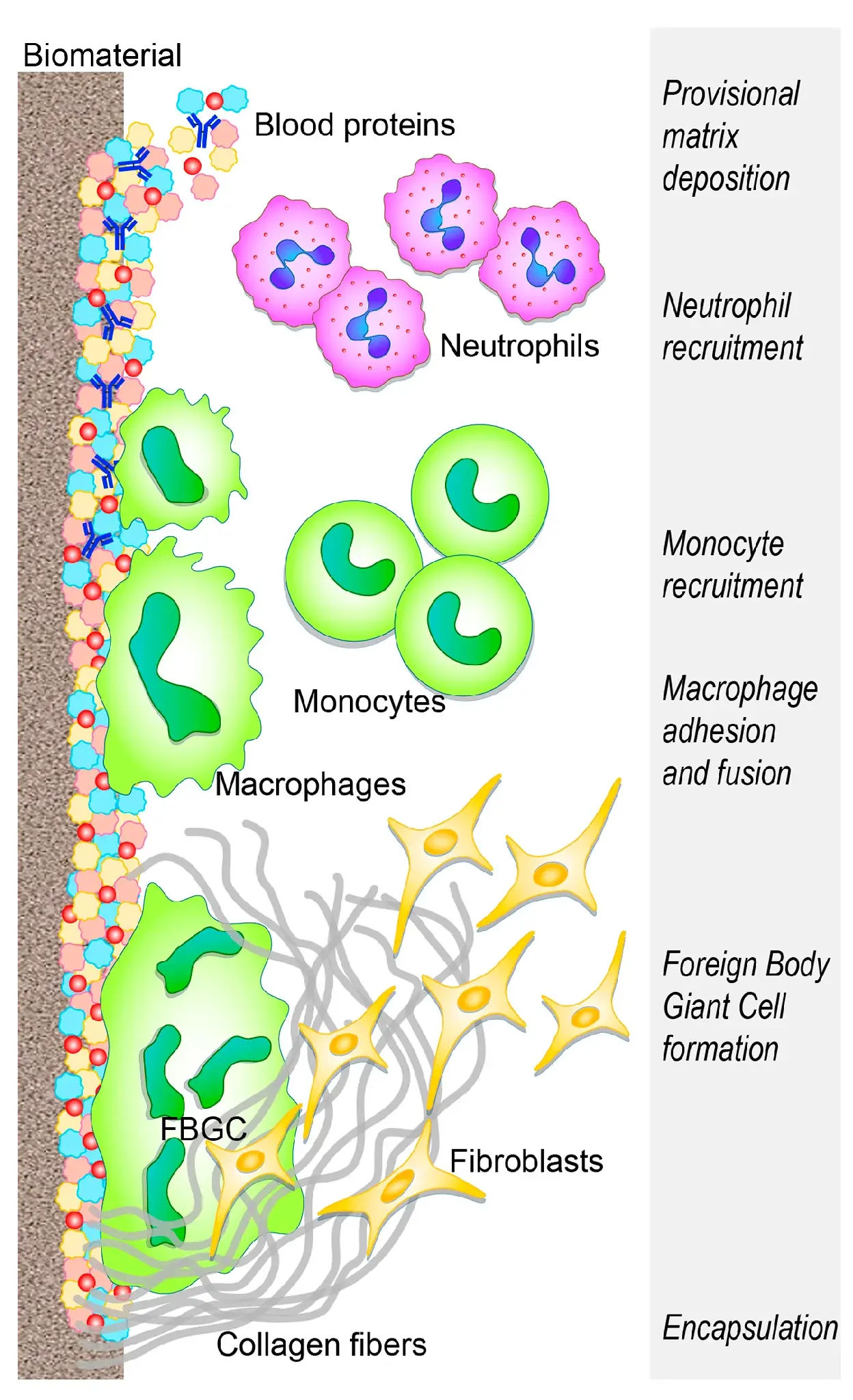
Proteins and immune cells involved in the process of foreign material identification and the subsequently-induced immune response of fibrous encapsulation in chronological order from top to bottom.

The use of cellular therapy as an alternative to immunosuppression involves the use of cells and cellular components to regulate the immune system to a state of homeostasis to combat the need of long-term immunosuppressant drugs. Regulatory T cells, neutrophils, macrophages, lymphocytes, chimeric antigen receptor T cells, mesenchymal stromal cells, pro- and anti-inflammatory cytokines, and regulatory myeloid cells are employed to promote anti-inflammatory outcomes in immune responses after the transplantation of foreign materials. The goal is to block certain signaling pathways that induce inflammatory responses at the transplantation site at the onset of foreign material identification. The purpose of manipulating these cells and the immune response is to reduce, if not prevent, malignancies and metabolic disorders from developing in the patient.

=== Tissue regeneration and repair ===
The immune system can also be used to induce regeneration or repair of native tissue through influencing specific signaling pathways during an immune response during the manipulation of the damaged tissue, the introduced biomaterial, and the immune cells involved. One of the more common tissues to be the center of this type of therapy for regeneration happens to be tendon tissue due to its low cell count and low vascularization, making it one of the most difficult tissues to heal. This type of therapy explores the benefits of using and manipulating biomaterials such as bioactive molecules, immune cells, and stem cells for the purpose of preventing the excess formation of scar tissue that eventually leads to mobility issues, fibrotic encapsulation, tissue destruction, isolation and rejection of medical devices, and chronic pain at the injury or operation site.

There are two levels of the immune system and how they interact with the introduced biomaterial to induce regeneration of the tissue. To begin, there has to be the initial recognition of the foreign material and a non-specific inflammatory response induced by the innate immune system. Next, the adaptive immune system induces multiple highly-specific antigen responses depending on the materials identified, and develops a long-term memory for materials to recognize in the future.

== mRNA vaccines ==
mRNA vaccines work similar to recombinant protein vaccines. Recombinant protein vaccines contain tiny proteins from the surface of the virus or bacteria they are trying to fight. Immune cells recognize foreign cells because their surface proteins are not the same shape as native cell surface proteins. The foreign surface proteins are also called antigens. When immune cells find the antigens delivered by the vaccine, they set off an immune response.

Unlike recombinant protein vaccines, mRNA vaccines directly contain mRNA strands that hold instructions for making surface proteins. When native cells receive the mRNA strands, they begin producing the antigens which triggers an immune response.

To fight the detected antigens, the lymph node starts producing B cells. B cells produce antibodies specific to the detected antigen. These antibodies are distributed through the body by plasma cells for around two weeks. Plasma cells tend to have short life spans, but those who live longer live in bone marrow and continue producing antibodies for years.

Memory B cells are also produced and deployed around the body. If a memory B cells later encounters the pathogen they were programmed to remember, they call for production of plasma cells that can deploy antibodies against the invading pathogen.
