= Nutrition Journal =

- Discipline: Nutrition science
- Language: English
- Edited by: Nehme Gabriel

Publication details
- History: 2002–present
- Publisher: BioMed Central
- Impact factor: 2.60 (2014)

Standard abbreviations
- ISO 4: Nutr. J.

Indexing
- ISSN: 1475-2891 (print); 1475-2891 (web)
- OCLC no.: 51238481

Links
- Journal homepage; Online access

The Nutrition Journal is a peer-reviewed medical journal covering nutrition science. It was established in 2002 and is published by BioMed Central, an imprint of Springer Science+Business Media. Its founding editor is Nehme Gabriel (Central Florida Health Alliance), the editors-in-chief are Xiang Gao and Qi Sun, and the editorial board members are Jean Abed, Elie Aoun, Catherine Chan, Zach Conrad, Sandra Crispim, Axel Fischer, Esther Granot, David Groneberg, Erin Hobin, Cyril Kendall, Deborah Kerr, Hamed Kioumarsi, Ingrid Kohlstadt, Joshua Lewis, Kate Northstone, Sudeep Shrestha, Wenbo Tang, Allen Taylor, Søren Toubro, Rick Weissinger, Sandeep Prabhu, Matam Vijay-Kumar, and Katarzyna Wojciechowska-Durczynska.

According to the Journal Citation Reports, the journal has a 2014 impact factor of 2.60.
