= Dendritic cell-based cancer vaccine =

The dendritic cell-based cancer vaccine is an innovation in therapeutic strategy for cancer patients.

Dendritic cells (DCs) are antigen presenting cells for the induction of antigen specific T cell response. DC-based immunotherapy is safe and can promote antitumor immune responses and prolonged survival of cancer patients.

== Human DC subsets ==
=== Immature dendritic cells ===
Non-activated (immature) DCs are usually located in the peripheral non-lymphoid tissues and they can present self-antigens to T cells, that leads to immune tolerance either through T cell deletion or through the differentiation of regulatory T cells.

=== Mature dendritic cells ===
Mature DCs have ability to present antigens in the lymphoid tissues, and to prime, activate, and expand immune effector cells with unique functions and cytokine profiles.

=== Myeloid dendritic cells (cDCs) ===
Myeloid or conventional DCs (cDCs) are derived from myeloid progenitor cells in the bone marrow and are characterized by expression of CD11c. cDCs can be subdivided into 3 groups: monocyte-derived DCs, CD1a- interstitial DCs, and CD1a+ Langerhans cells.

=== Plasmacytoid dendritic cells (pDCs) ===
Plasmacytoid dendritic cells (pDCs) differentiate from lymphoid progenitor cells in the lymphoid tissues. They express CD123 and product high levels of type I interferon. pDCs also contribute to inflammatory responses in the steady state and in pathology. During inflammatory response, inflammatory DCs (iDCs) are generated from monocytes.

== Function of cancer therapeutic vaccines ==
The main goal of the therapeutic vaccines is to elicit cellular immunity. They should prime naïve T cell, and induce transition from chronically activated non-protective CD8^{+} T cells to healthy CD8^{+} T cells that can produce cytotoxic T lymphocytes (CTLs), which recognize and eliminate cancer cells by recognizing specific antigens. This process also creates long-lived memory CD8^{+} T cells that will act to prevent relapse. The most critical step in vaccination is the effective presentation of cancer antigens to T cells, and because of DCs are the most efficient antigen presenting cells, they are the promising option for improvement of therapeutic vaccines.

== Methods for exploiting dendritic cells in cancer therapeutic vaccines ==
DC-based immunotherapy approach can be employed in two ways:

=== Direct targeting/stimulating of the DCs in vivo to accentuate their anticancer phenotype ===
Many trials evaluating in vivo DC stimulation with synthetic peptides failed because of inability of effective stimulation of CD4^{+} cellular responses and stimulation of Th2 type cytokines. The solution showing clinical responses was pre-treatment with single-dose cyclophosphamide as well as vaccination with tumor associated antigens (TAAs) and granulocyte macrophage colony stimulating factor (GM-CSF).

=== Stimulation of the DCs ex vivo and infusing them back into the host for carrying out anticancer effector function ===
In this way, DCs’ precursors are isolated from the patient through leukapheresis and after maturation/stimulation of these precursors ex vivo, fully mature DCs are injected back into the patient. There are different ways applied to generate cancer cells-specific DCs. We can used specific TAAs, tumor lysates, created DC-cancer cell fusions, electroporation/transfection of DCs with total cancer cell-mRNA or tumor derived exosomes (TDEs) by the stimulation. There is also the possibility of additional co-stimulating with cytokine “cocktails” to assure strong maturation.

== Dendritic cell vaccine against brain tumor ==
The most well-known source of antigens used for vaccines in Glioblastoma (Aggressive type of brain tumor) investigations were whole tumor lysate, CMV antigen RNA and tumor associated peptides for instance EGFRvIII. The initial studies showed that patients developed immune responses as measured by Interferon-gamma expression in the peripheral blood, systemic cytokine responses, or CD8+ antigen specific T cell expansion. Clinical response rates were not as vigorous as the immune response rates. Overall survival (OS) and progression free survival (PFS) varied in different studies but were enhanced compared to historical controls. This low success of DC vaccines against glioblastoma could be explained by immuno-resistance mechanisms, even those that could be directly induced by the DC vaccines themselves e.g., lymph node-to-tumor circuit of PD-L1+ macrophages that can cause cross-organ deletion of CD8+ T cells thereby undermining anti-glioblastoma immunity.

== Dendritic cell vaccine against COVID-19 ==
Autologous dendritic cells previously loaded ex-vivo with SARS-CoV-2 spike protein. Subjects eligible for treatment will be those who at baseline, are not actively infected with SARS-CoV-2, have no evidence of prior infection with SARS-CoV-2 based on serologic testing, and give informed consent for a vaccination with AV-COVID-19. The patient population will include the elderly and others at higher risk for poor outcomes after COVID-19 infection. For this reason, individuals will not be excluded solely on the basis of age, body mass index, history of hypertension, diabetes, cancer, or autoimmune disease.

== Sipuleucel-T ==
Sipuleucel-T is the first DCs- based cancer vaccine for men with asymptomatic or minimally symptomatic metastatic castration-resistant prostate cancer (CRPC), approved by the US Food and Drug Administration (FDA) . It is an active cellular immunotherapy, which involves obtaining antigen-presenting autologous dendritic cells from the patient following a leukapheresis procedure. The cells are incubated ex vivo in the presence of a recombinant fusion protein PA2024 containing a prostate antigen, prostate acid phosphatase and GM-CSF, an immune-cell activator. The cells are then returned to the patient to generate an immune response.
