= Larry McIntire =

Larry V. McIntire was an American engineering educator.

McIntire earned a bachelor degree in chemical engineering and a concurrent master's of science from Cornell University in 1966. He earned the master of arts in 1968 and doctorate in 1970 at Princeton University. He died on January 23, 2026 at the age of 85 years old.

McIntire began his teaching career at Rice University in 1970, where he was later named E.D. Butcher Professor of Bioengineering and Chemical Engineering and chaired Rice's Department of Bioengineering, as well as the Institute of Biosciences and Bioengineering. While on the faculty at Rice, he was elected a 1992 fellow of the American Institute for Medical and Biological Engineering, served as president of the AIMBE between 1997 and 1998, was elected a 1998 fellow of the American Association for the Advancement of Science, and a 2001 member of the United States National Academy of Engineering. He moved to the Georgia Institute of Technology and Emory University in 2003 as Wallace Coulter Chair of the Department of Biomedical Engineering, jointly run by the two schools. McIntire later served as chair of AAAS Section M (Engineering).
