= National Register of Historic Places listings in New Haven, Connecticut =

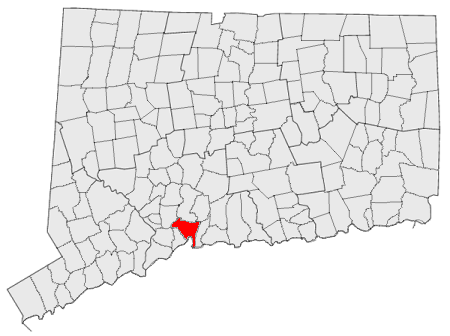
Location of New Haven in Connecticut

This is a list of National Register of Historic Places listings in New Haven, Connecticut. This is intended to be a complete list of the properties and districts on the National Register of Historic Places in the city of New Haven, Connecticut, United States. The locations of National Register properties and districts for which the latitude and longitude coordinates are included below, may be seen in an online map.

There are 277 properties and districts listed on the National Register in New Haven County. The city of New Haven is the location of 71 of these properties and districts, including 9 National Historic Landmarks; they are listed here, while the other properties and districts in the remaining parts of the county, including 1 National Historic Landmark, are covered in National Register of Historic Places listings in New Haven County, Connecticut. Three sites appear in both New Haven County lists.

Contents: Counties and municipalities in Connecticut

Fairfield (city of Bridgeport | town of Greenwich | city of Stamford) | Hartford (city of Hartford | town of Southington | town of West Hartford | town of Windsor) | Litchfield | Middlesex (city of Middletown) | New Haven (city of New Haven) | New London | Tolland | Windham

This National Park Service list is complete through NPS recent listings posted September 4, 2026.

== Current listings ==
	Name on the Register	Image	Date listed	Location	Neighborhood	Description
1	Ahavas Sholem Synagogue	Ahavas Sholem Synagogue	May 11, 1995 (#95000559)	30 White Street; 41°17′54″N 72°56′25″W	Hill	A former synagogue whose elaborate facade demonstrates "design effort directed, with considerable success, toward establishing a Jewish presence in the streetscape."
2	Armstrong Rubber Company Building	Armstrong Rubber Company Building	April 29, 2021 (#100006451)	500 Sargent Drive; 41°17′48″N 72°55′07″W	Long Wharf	Noted example of brutalism by architect Marcel Breuer
3	M. Armstrong and Company Carriage Factory	M. Armstrong and Company Carriage Factory	August 31, 2011 (#11000612)	433 Chapel Street; 41°18′13″N 72°54′44″W	Fair Haven	Historic 19th century carriage factory building
4	Beaver Hills Historic District	Beaver Hills Historic District	July 31, 1986 (#86002108)	Roughly bounded by Crescent Street, Goffe Terrace, and Boulevard; 41°19′28″N 72°56′39″W	Beaver Hills	This neighborhood was developed in the early 1900s and was one of the first car-oriented neighborhoods in the region. It preserves Colonial Revival and other residential architecture.
5	Beth Israel Synagogue	Beth Israel Synagogue	May 11, 1995 (#95000578)	232 Orchard Street; 41°17′54″N 72°56′25″W	West River	A Colonial Revival building from 1925, designed by architect Louis Abramowitz for the orthodox synagogue.
6	Elisha Blackman Building	Elisha Blackman Building	December 20, 1978 (#78002863)	176 York Street; 41°18′29″N 72°55′57″W	Downtown	Built in 1883 as an investment by a former carriage manufacturer, the building was the first commercial + rental building in a residential area with very fine design and workmanship.
7	Chapel Street Historic District	Chapel Street Historic District	April 5, 1984 (#84001123)	Roughly bounded by Park, Chapel, Temple, George, and Crown Streets; 41°18′20″N 72°55′47″W	Downtown and Dwight	A historic district representing the commercial development of New Haven in the late nineteenth and early twentieth centuries.
8	Russell Henry Chittenden House	Russell Henry Chittenden House	May 15, 1975 (#75001944)	83 Trumbull Street; 41°18′48″N 72°55′23″W	Prospect Hill	Home of Russell Henry Chittenden, the "father of American biochemistry", from 1887 to 1943. The irregularly shaped three story house with Queen Anne elements was built in 1887 of brick, frame and shingling with gabled roof sections, gabled dormers, interior chimneys with corbeled caps, a square corner tower and a round-arched first-floor window.
9	Christ Church New Haven	Christ Church New Haven	June 19, 2009 (#09000420)	70 Broadway; 41°18′44″N 72°55′56″W	Dixwell (in Broadway district)	Episcopal parish church, begun as an offshoot from New Haven's Trinity Church, the central Episcopal church on New Haven's town green. This Gothic building, completed in 1898, was designed by architect Henry Vaughan and includes a stone tower in the style of one at the University of Oxford.
10	Connecticut Agricultural Experiment Station	Connecticut Agricultural Experiment Station	October 15, 1966 (#66000805)	123 Huntington Street; 41°19′51″N 72°55′10″W	Prospect Hill	Home of the first agricultural experiment station in the United States. It was started in 1875 in Middletown and moved to New Haven in 1877. Its Osborne Library, built during 1882-83, is oldest building of any such station. Located at top of Prospect Hill, the station was the center of early research on vitamins.
11	Connecticut Hall, Yale University	Connecticut Hall, Yale University	October 15, 1966 (#66000806)	1017 Chapel Street; 41°18′29″N 72°55′46″W	Downtown	Georgian-style building from 1752 that is the oldest Yale University building and only survivor of the original Old Brick Row. Funded originally in part from the sale of a French ship, it was gutted and rebuilt in the 1950s.
12	John Cook House	John Cook House	November 3, 1983 (#83003576)	35 Elm Street; 41°18′26″N 72°55′21″W	Downtown	One of the oldest stone buildings in New Haven, the house has unusual sandstone quoining and a ballroom on the 3rd floor. Adjacent to the 1828 Caroline Nicoll House.
13	George W. Crawford House	George W. Crawford House	April 8, 2015 (#15000113)	84–96 Park Street; 41°18′24″N 72°56′07″W	Dwight	Brutalist apartment house designed by Paul Rudolph
14	Dixwell Avenue Congregational United Church of Christ	Dixwell Avenue Congregational United Church of Christ	November 29, 2018 (#100003148)	217 Dixwell Avenue; 41°19′08″N 72°56′02″W	Dixwell	Brutalist structure designed by John M. Johansen and home to historic African American congregation
15	James Dwight Dana House	James Dwight Dana House	October 15, 1966 (#66000874)	24 Hillhouse Avenue; 41°18′47″N 72°55′30″W	Downtown	Home of Yale geologist, James Dwight Dana; designed by Henry Austin
16	Dwight Street Historic District	Dwight Street Historic District	September 8, 1983 (#83001281)	Roughly bounded by Park, North Frontage, Scranton, Sherman, and Elm Streets; 41°18′38″N 72°56′23″W	Dwight and West River	Historic district with well-preserved 19th and early 20th century residential architecture
17	East Rock Park	East Rock Park	April 15, 1997 (#97000299)	Roughly bounded by State, Davis, and Livingston Streets, Park and Mitchell Drives, and Whitney Avenue; 41°19′41″N 72°54′21″W	East Rock and Hamden	Designed by the Olmsted Brothers, this park includes East Rock Ridge and the Soldiers' and Sailors' Monument.
18	Edgerton	Edgerton	September 19, 1988 (#88001469)	75 Cliff Street; 41°20′04″N 72°54′52″W	Prospect Hill	This 20-acre (8.1 ha) historic district is a public park, the site of the estate of Frederick F. Brewster, the industrialist. The 1909 mansion was demolished in 1964 leaving the gatehouse, carriage house, greenhouses, other structures, and landscaped grounds. Extends into Hamden, elsewhere in New Haven County
19	Edgewood Park Historic District	Edgewood Park Historic District	September 9, 1986 (#86001991)	Roughly bounded by Whalley Avenue and Elm Street, Sherman Avenue and Boulevard, Edgewood and Derby, and Yale Avenues; 41°18′55″N 72°57′16″W	Edgewood, Westville, and West River	Historic residential neighborhood with late 19th century Queen Anne and colonial revival structures.
20	Farmington Canal-New Haven and Northampton Canal	Farmington Canal-New Haven and Northampton Canal	September 12, 1985 (#85002664)	Roughly from Suffield in Hartford County to New Haven in New Haven County; 41°19′26″N 72°55′51″W	Newhallville, Dixwell, and Downtown	Extends northward through Hamden and Cheshire (other towns in New Haven County) to Hartford County. Built as a canal, later became a railroad line, and now a multi-use trail.
21	Five Mile Point Lighthouse	Five Mile Point Lighthouse	August 1, 1990 (#90001108)	Lighthouse Point Park; 41°14′56″N 72°54′14″W	East Shore	Octagonal lighthouse built in 1847.
22	Fort Nathan Hale	Fort Nathan Hale	October 28, 1970 (#70000711)	Southern end of Woodward Avenue; 41°16′12″N 72°53′55″W	East Shore	Site of forts dating from the colonial era through the Civil War.
23	Goffe Street Special School for Colored Children	Goffe Street Special School for Colored Children	August 17, 1979 (#79002643)	106 Goffe Street; 41°18′56″N 72°56′06″W	Dixwell	Permanent school that grew out of a meeting of New Haven citizens in 1864. New Haven architect Henry Austin donated the design. Used as a school until 1874 when African-American children began attending previously all white public schools. The building was then used by African-American community organizations.
24	Grove Street Cemetery	Grove Street Cemetery	August 8, 1997 (#97000830)	200 Grove Street; 41°18′49″N 72°55′39″W	Downtown	Final resting place of many Yale and New Haven notables including Roger Sherman, Noah Webster and Eli Whitney.
25	Hall-Benedict Drug Company Building	Hall-Benedict Drug Company Building	June 5, 1986 (#86001205)	763–767 Orange Street; 41°19′16″N 72°54′45″W	East Rock	Well-preserved commercial building from 1909.
26	Hillhouse Avenue Historic District	Hillhouse Avenue Historic District	September 13, 1985 (#85002507)	Bounded by Sachem, Temple, Trumbull, and Prospect Streets, Whitney and Hillhouse Avenues, and Railroad Tracks; 41°18′50″N 72°55′23″W	Prospect Hill and Downtown	Historic street with landmark nineteenth century mansions.
27	Elizabeth R. Hooker House	Elizabeth R. Hooker House	May 27, 2010 (#09000695)	123 Edgehill Road; 41°19′58″N 72°55′00″W	Prospect Hill	English style Arts and Crafts suburban villa designed by Delano & Aldrich and built in 1914 for the progressive activist, Elizabeth R. Hooker.
28	Howard Avenue Historic District	Howard Avenue Historic District	September 12, 1985 (#85002308)	Properties along Howard Avenue between Interstate 95 and Washington Street; 41°17′31″N 72°55′59″W	Hill (including City Point)	Well-preserved late 19th century vernacular architecture.
29	Imperial Granum-Joseph Parker Buildings	Imperial Granum-Joseph Parker Buildings	March 6, 1986 (#86000409)	47 and 49–51 Elm Street; 41°18′27″N 72°55′23″W	Downtown	Fine pair of commercial buildings from the office of Henry Austin.
30	Lighthouse Point Carousel	Lighthouse Point Carousel	December 15, 1983 (#83003578)	Lighthouse Point Park, Lighthouse Avenue; 41°14′54″N 72°54′12″W	East Shore	Early 20th century historic carousel in renaissance revival building.
31	Lincoln Theatre	Lincoln Theatre	March 1, 1984 (#84001134)	1 Lincoln Street; 41°18′43″N 72°55′12″W	Downtown	1925 theatre with English free style facade
32	Long Wharf Pier		December 6, 2024 (#100011121)	351 Long Wharf Drive; 41°17′39″N 72°55′00″W	Long Wharf	Historic shipping wharf dating from 1810; significant achievement of engineering by William Lanson
33	Othniel C. Marsh House	Othniel C. Marsh House	October 15, 1966 (#66000875)	360 Prospect Street; 41°19′19″N 72°55′30″W	Prospect Hill	Home of Yale paleontologist Othniel Charles Marsh; now part of the Yale School of Forestry.
34	Lafayette B. Mendel House	Lafayette B. Mendel House	January 7, 1976 (#76002138)	18 Trumbull Street; 41°18′39″N 72°55′07″W	Downtown	Home of Yale biochemist Lafayette Mendel; designed by Henry Austin
35	Dr. Mary B. Moody House	Dr. Mary B. Moody House	May 1, 2017 (#100000930)	154 East Grand Avenue; 41°18′23″N 72°52′55″W	Fair Haven Heights	Home of physician Mary Blair Moody
36	Morris Cove Historic District	Morris Cove Historic District	April 19, 2018 (#100002320)	Between Dean & Myron Streets, Morris Causeway & Townsend Avenue; 41°15′52″N 72°53′41″W	East Shore	Seasonal resort and streetcar suburb with early 20th century residential architecture.
37	Morris House	Morris House	December 4, 1972 (#72001341)	325 Lighthouse Road; 41°15′17″N 72°53′46″W	East Shore	One of New Haven's oldest surviving buildings
38	Mory's	Mory's	January 25, 2005 (#04001552)	306 York Street; 41°18′41″N 72°55′54″W	Dixwell (in Broadway district)	Storied private club adjacent to Yale University.
39	New Haven City Hall	New Haven City Hall	September 9, 1975 (#75001940)	161 Church Street; 41°18′26″N 72°55′29″W	Downtown	Victorian Gothic structure designed by Henry Austin
40	New Haven Armory	New Haven Armory	May 19, 2021 (#100006556)	270-290 Goffe Street; 41°19′07″N 72°56′21″W	Dixwell	Massive Romanesque revival built from 1928 to 1930.
41	New Haven Clock Company Factory	New Haven Clock Company Factory	March 20, 2017 (#100000761)	133 Hamilton Street; 41°18′26″N 72°54′45″W	Wooster Square	Originally a 14-building complex built in the 19th century.
42	New Haven County Courthouse	New Haven County Courthouse	May 16, 2003 (#03000404)	121 Elm Street; 41°18′38″N 72°55′27″W	Downtown	Beaux Arts building from 1917, facing on New Haven Green, and containing "several of the city's grandest interior spaces". Site of Griswold v. Connecticut, a historic trial involving women's right to birth control, and the New Haven Black Panther trials.
43	New Haven Green Historic District	New Haven Green Historic District	December 30, 1970 (#70000838)	Bounded by Chapel, College, Elm, and Church Streets; 41°18′27″N 72°55′37″W	Downtown	Large town green includes three historic churches.
44	New Haven Jewish Home for the Aged	New Haven Jewish Home for the Aged	June 19, 1979 (#79002641)	169 Davenport Avenue; 41°18′09″N 72°56′23″W	Hill	Historic nursing home with Beaux Arts styling.
45	New Haven Lawn Club	New Haven Lawn Club	May 1, 2003 (#03000309)	193 Whitney Avenue; 41°18′57″N 72°55′10″W	East Rock	The clubhouse, designed by Douglas Orr, combines elements of Colonial Revival and Art Moderne styles.
46	New Haven Railroad Station	New Haven Railroad Station	September 3, 1975 (#75001941)	50 Union Avenue; 41°17′51″N 72°55′37″W	Long Wharf	Beaux-arts station designed by Cass Gilbert
47	Caroline Nicoll House	Caroline Nicoll House	January 14, 1983 (#83001283)	27 Elm Street; 41°18′27″N 72°55′19″W	Downtown	1828 Federal/Greek Revival townhouse; adjacent to the John Cook House.
48	Ninth Square Historic District	Ninth Square Historic District	May 3, 1984 (#84001135)	Roughly bounded by Church, State, George, and Court Streets; 41°18′17″N 72°55′28″W	Downtown	Historic commercial district with 19th and early 20th century buildings.
49	Orange Street Historic District	Orange Street Historic District	September 12, 1985 (#85002314)	Roughly bounded by Whitney Avenue, State, Eagle, and Trumbull Streets; 41°18′56″N 72°54′55″W	East Rock	Well-preserved 19th century residential buildings; the second set of addresses represent a boundary increase approved July 24, 2017.
50	Oyster Point Historic District	Oyster Point Historic District	August 10, 1989 (#89001085)	Roughly bounded by Interstate 95, South Water Street, Howard Avenue, Sea Street, and Greenwich Avenue; 41°16′59″N 72°55′47″W	Hill (City Point section)	Oystering district (until 1925) with distinctive oystermen's houses.
51	William Pinto House	William Pinto House	September 12, 1985 (#85002316)	283 Orange Street; 41°18′29″N 72°55′21″W	Downtown	1810 Gablefront federal house; home to Eli Whitney.
52	Plymouth Congregational Church	Plymouth Congregational Church	July 28, 1983 (#83001250)	1469 Chapel Street; 41°18′41″N 72°56′40″W	Dwight	Late 19th century brownstone Romanesque Revival former church. After damage, the building was gutted and rebuilt for offices.
53	Prospect Hill Historic District	Prospect Hill Historic District	November 2, 1979 (#79002670)	Prospect Street and St. Ronan Street; 41°19′30″N 72°55′15″W	Prospect Hill and Dixwell	Area of historic mansions and some institutional buildings
54	Quinnipiac Brewery	Quinnipiac Brewery	July 15, 1983 (#83001285)	19-23 River Street; 41°18′14″N 72°53′37″W	Fair Haven	Factory complex dominated by six story Romanesque Revival main building.
55	Quinnipiac River Historic District	Quinnipiac River Historic District	June 28, 1984 (#84001139)	Roughly bounded by Quinnipiac Avenue, Lexington, Chapel, Ferry, Pine, Front, and Lombard Streets; 41°18′35″N 72°52′59″W	Fair Haven and Fair Haven Heights	Historic maritime village dating from the 18th century.
56	Raynham	Raynham	July 11, 1980 (#80004062)	709 Townsend Avenue; 41°16′34″N 72°53′42″W	East Shore	Gothic revival mansion and surrounding estate.
57	River Street Historic District	River Street Historic District	January 26, 1989 (#88003213)	Roughly bounded by Chapel Street, Blatchley Avenue, New Haven Harbor, and James Street; 41°18′08″N 72°54′04″W	Fair Haven	Industrial district with a historic focus on metalworking businesses.
58	Schlaraffia Burg	Schlaraffia Burg	May 13, 2007 (#06000616)	715 Sherman Parkway/280 West Hazel Street; 41°19′48″N 72°56′16″W	Newhallville	Built in 1926 as a social hall for the local German immigrant community.
59	Southern New England Telephone Company Administrative Building	Southern New England Telephone Company Administrative Building	November 24, 1997 (#97001447)	227 Church Street; 41°18′33″N 72°55′25″W	Downtown	Art Deco building designed by Douglas Orr
60	Southwest Ledge Lighthouse	Southwest Ledge Lighthouse	May 29, 1990 (#89001475)	Southwestern end of the east breakwater at the entrance to New Haven Harbor; 41°13′53″N 72°55′25″W	New Haven Harbor	Completed in 1877, this lighthouse with Second Empire style architecture above, was the first or one of the first built on a cylindrical iron foundation, an innovation to address shifting ice that is regarded as very important in lighthouse design.
61	St. Luke's Episcopal Church	St. Luke's Episcopal Church	November 21, 2003 (#03001170)	111-113 Whalley Avenue; 41°18′51″N 72°56′09″W	Dixwell	1905 Gothic revival structure built for an African American congregation founded in 1844.
62	Strouse, Adler Company Corset Factory	Strouse, Adler Company Corset Factory	August 22, 2002 (#02000864)	78-84 Olive Street; 41°18′20″N 72°55′11″W	Wooster Square	Historic factory complex built between 1876 and 1923.
63	Trowbridge Square Historic District	Trowbridge Square Historic District	September 12, 1985 (#85002311)	Roughly bounded by Columbus and Howard Avenues; 41°17′47″N 72°55′55″W	Hill	Well-preserved 19th century working-class neighborhood.
64	United States Post Office and Court House	United States Post Office and Court House	September 14, 2015 (#15000586)	145 Church Street; 41°18′24″N 72°55′30″W	Downtown	Monumental 1919 classical revival courthouse clad in Tennessee marble.
65	Upper State Street Historic District	Upper State Street Historic District	September 7, 1984 (#84001143)	Roughly State Street from Bradley Street to Mill River Street; 41°18′53″N 72°54′41″W	East Rock	Historic late-19th century commercial district.
66	Welch Training School	Welch Training School	April 21, 1983 (#83001286)	495 Congress Avenue; 41°18′04″N 72°56′15″W	Hill	Queen Anne style school designed by Leoni W. Robinson
67	Westville Village Historic District	Westville Village Historic District	January 23, 2003 (#02001727)	Roughly along Blake Street and Whalley Avenue; also 827 Whalley Avenue; 41°19′38″N 72°57′32″W	Westville and West Rock	Area of commercial buildings and more. 827 Whalley represents a boundary increase of October 25, 2006
68	Whitney Avenue Historic District	Whitney Avenue Historic District	February 2, 1989 (#88003209)	Roughly bounded by Burns Street, Livingston Street, Cold Spring Street, Orange Street, Bradley Street, and Whitney Avenue; 41°19′23″N 72°54′53″W	East Rock and Prospect Hill	A middle- and upper-class residential neighborhood that showcases Queen Anne style architecture in the United States, Shingle, Colonial Revival, Tudor Revival, and other architecture.
69	Winchester Repeating Arms Company Historic District	Winchester Repeating Arms Company Historic District	January 28, 1988 (#87002552)	Roughly bounded by Hamden Town line, Mansfield, Hazel & Division Streets, Winchester Avenue, and Sherman Parkway; 41°19′16″N 72°55′55″W	Newhallville and Dixwell	Historic district including Leoni W. Robinson-designed buildings of the Winchester Repeating Arms Company and surrounding areas of single- and multi-family workers' houses.
70	Wooster Square Historic District	Wooster Square Historic District	August 5, 1971 (#71000914)	Roughly bounded by Columbus, Wooster Square, Chapel Street, and Court Street; 41°18′16″N 72°55′05″W	Wooster Square	19th century residential neighborhood centered around Wooster Square Park restored and preserved starting in the late 1950s.
71	Yale Bowl	Yale Bowl	February 27, 1987 (#87000756)	81 Central Avenue; 41°18′46″N 72°57′39″W	Westville	Bowl stadium, model for the Rose Bowl and others. Home of Yale Bulldogs football and The Game.

== Former building ==
	Name on the Register	Image	Date listed	Date removed	Location	Neighborhood	Description
1	First Telephone Exchange	First Telephone Exchange	October 15, 1966 (#66000961)	May 7, 1973	733 Chapel Street; 41°18′16″N 72°55′17″W	Downtown	Former National Historic Landmark. Location of the First Telephone Exchange in the United States. Demolished in 1973 to make way for a parking garage.

== See also ==
- List of National Historic Landmarks in Connecticut
- National Register of Historic Places listings in Connecticut
