= New Haven Fire Department =

Operational area
- Country: United States
- State: Connecticut
- City: New Haven

Agency overview
- Established: June 24, 1862
- Annual calls: 32,025 (2018)
- Employees: 357 (2018)
- Annual budget: $33,230,733 (2018)
- Staffing: Career
- Fire chief: Daniel Coughlin (acting)
- EMS level: ALS and BLS
- IAFF: 825

Facilities and equipment
- Divisions: 1
- Battalions: 2
- Stations: 10
- Engines: 10
- Trucks: 4
- Rescues: 1
- Ambulances: 3
- Tenders: 1
- HAZMAT: 1
- USAR: 1
- Wildland: 1
- Fireboats: 1
- Rescue boats: 2
- Light and air: 1

Website
- Official website
- IAFF website

The New Haven Fire Department (NHFD) provides fire protection and emergency medical services to the city of New Haven, Connecticut. The New Haven Fire Department currently serves a population of over 130,000 people living in 19 square miles of land and is one of the largest fire departments in the state.

The NHFD provides advanced life support and basic life support emergency medical services to the city with three paramedic-staffed Emergency Units. EMS transport services are contracted by the city to American Medical Response which provides response to medical emergencies with Basic Life Support (BLS)/Emergency Medical Technician (EMT) Staffed and Advanced Life Support (ALS)/Emergency Medical Technician-Paramedic (EMT-Paramedic) Staffed ambulances.

As of 2016 the NHFD has received an ISO Class 1 rating, making New Haven the third department in Connecticut (the other two being Hartford, CT and Milford, CT) with an ISO Class 1 rating and 1 of 60+/- departments in the country. James T. Mullen was fire commissioner for 13 years.

== Operations ==
=== Fire station locations and companies/units ===
The New Haven Fire Department currently operates out of 10 fire stations, strategically located throughout the city. The Department is organized into 2 battalions: East Battalion and West Battalion. The NHFD operates with 10 engine companies, 4 truck companies, 1 heavy rescue company, 1 mobile command unit, 1 haz-mat unit, 1 fireground rehabilitation unit, 3 paramedic emergency units, and a fireboat along with several special units. Each engine company and truck company is staffed by an officer and 3 firefighters/EMTs. Rescue 1 is staffed by an officer and 4 firefighters/EMTs. SOC 1 (Special Operations Command 1) is staffed by an officer and 1 firefighter/EMT. Each Emergency (EMS) unit is staffed by 1 firefighter/paramedic and 1 Firefighter/EMT. The haz-mat unit and rehab units are crossed staffed by the officer and firefighter/EMT from SOC 1. Each Battalion Chiefs unit is staffed by a battalion chief. The Deputy Chief serves as the city wide tour commander. Truck 1 operates a Tower Ladder Truck. Truck 4 and Truck 2 operate Tillers. Truck 3 operates a Regular Aerial Ladder Truck.

As of December 2019 this is a listing of all stations and apparatus in front line service operated by the New Haven Fire Department.

Engine Companies	Truck Companies	Emergency Unit (EMS)	Special Unit	Car Unit	Spare Unit	Battalion	Address	Neighborhood
Engine 4	Truck 1 (Tower Ladder)		SOC 1, Rehab Unit 1, Marine Unit 2 (Rescue Boat), Marine Unit 3 (Rescue Boat), Car 95 (Fire Investigation Unit), Car 101 (Tows Rescue Boat), Fire Inspectors (FM 1-9)	Car 31 (Chief Of Department), Car 32 (Deputy Chief / Tour Commander), Car 37 (Fire Marshal), Car 38 (Assistant Chief, Administration), Car 39 (Assistant Chief, Operations)	Engine 4A, Car 32A	East Battalion	952 Grand Avenue	Downtown
Engine 5		Emergency Unit 1 (Non-Transport Unit)	Car 43 (Foam Tender)		Emergency Unit 1A(Non-transport Unit)	East Battalion	824 Woodward Avenue	The Annex
Engine 6	Truck 4(Tiller)	Emergency Unit 3 (Non-Transport Unit)	Car 45 (Mobile Command Unit), Engine 4 (Benevolent Association Antique)		Engine 6A, Truck 4A	West Battalion	125 Goffe Street	Dixwell
Engine 8			Rescue 1, Hazmat 1, USAR Collapse Rescue Trailer			West Battalion	350 Whitney Avenue	East Rock
Engine 9				Car 34 (West Battalion Chief)	Engine 9A	West Battalion	120 Ellsworth Avenue	Edgewood
Engine 10	Truck 3			Car 33 (East Battalion Chief)	Engine 10A, Car 33A	East Battalion	412 Lombard Street	Fair Haven
Engine 11	Truck 2(Tiller)	Emergency Unit 2 (Non-Transport Unit)			Emergency Unit 2A (Non-transport Unit)	West Battalion	525 Howard Avenue	The Hill
Engine 15						West Battalion	105 Fountain Street	Westville
Engine 16						East Battalion	510 Lighthouse Road	Morris Cove, East Shore
Engine 17			Car 47 (Brush Unit)			East Battalion	73 East Grand Avenue	Fair Haven Heights
			Marine Unit 1 (Fireboat "Nathan Hale")			East Battalion	Long Wharf Pier	New Haven Harbor
			Car 50 (Mask Service/Cascade Unit), Car 51 (Supr. of Apparatus), Car 52-53 (Shop Mechanics), Car 54 (Supr. of Building Maint.), Car 55-56 (Building Maint.), Car 81 (Drillmaster), Car 82-85 (Asst. Drillmasters)	Car 36 (Director of Training/Safety), EMS 5 (Supervisor)	Car 50A, Car 47A	West Battalion	230 Ella T. Grasso Boulevard	City Point

=== Disbanded Fire Companies ===
- Engine 1 - 525 Howard Avenue
- Engine 2 - 952 Grand Avenue
- Engine 3 - 125 Goffe Street (Closed to form Tactical Unit 1)
- Engine 7 - 412 Lombard Street (Closed to form Tactical Unit 2)
- Engine 12 - 47 Crown Street
- Engine 13 - Never Organized
- Engine 14 - 150 Highland Street
- Truck 5 - 105 Fountain Street
- Truck 6 - 350 Whitney Avenue
- Tactical Unit 1 - 125 Goffe Street (Closed to form Squad 1)
- Tactical Unit 2 - 412 Lombard Street (Closed to form Squad 2)
- Car 35 (Second/Central Battalion Chief) - 350 Whitney Avenue
- Squad 1 - 350 Whitney Avenue (Closed in November, 2019 to form Rescue 1, SOC 1, Emergency 3)
- Squad 2 - 120 Ellsworth Avenue (Closed in November, 2019 to form Rescue 1, SOC 1, Emergency 3)

=== Apparatus Manufacturers ===
- Engine 4 - 2012 Pierce Arrow XT 1250gpm./500gal. Pumper
- Engine 5 - 2014 Pierce Arrow XT 1500gpm./500gal./500gal. Foam Pumper
- Engine 6 - 2016 Pierce Arrow XT 1250gpm./500gal. Pumper
- Engine 8 - 2011 Pierce Arrow XT 1250gpm./500gal. Rescue Pumper (Ex-Squad 2)
- Engine 9 - 2014 Pierce Arrow XT 1250gpm./500gal. Pumper
- Engine 10 - 2018 Seagrave Marauder 1500gpm./750gal. Pumper
- Engine 11 - 2014 Pierce Arrow XT 1250gpm./500gal. Pumper
- Engine 15 - 2018 Seagrave Marauder 1500gpm./750gal. Pumper
- Engine 16 - 2006 Pierce / Kenworth 1000gpm./750gal. Pumper (Ex-Engine 10)
- Engine 17 - 2016 Pierce Arrow XT 1250gpm./500gal. Pumper (Ex-Engine 10)
- Engine 4A (Spare) - 2000 Pierce Quantum 1250gpm./500gal. Pumper (Ex-Engine 4)
- Engine 6A (Spare) - 2003 Pierce Quantum 1250gpm./500gal. Pumper (Ex-Engine 6, Engine 5)
- Engine 8A (Spare) - 1998 Pierce Quantum 1250gpm./500gal. Pumper (Ex-Engine 8, Engine 6)
- Engine 9A (Spare) - 2000 Pierce Quantum 1250gpm./500gal. Pumper (Ex-Engine 9)
- Engine 17A (Spare) - 2007 Pierce Arrow XT 1250gpm./500gal. Pumper. (Ex- Engine 17)
- Truck 1 - 2013 Sutphen SPH 100' Mid-Mount Platform Tower Ladder
- Truck 2 - 2008 Seagrave Marauder II 100' Tractor-Drawn Aerial Ladder
- Truck 3 - 2010 Pierce Arrow XT 100' Rear-Mount Aerial Ladder
- Truck 4 - 2018 Seagrave Marauder II 100' Tractor-Drawn Aerial Ladder
- Truck 1A (Spare) - 1996 Sutphen 100' Mid-Mount Platform Tower Ladder (Ex-Truck 1)
- Truck 4A (Spare) - 2005 Seagrave Commander II 100' Tractor Drawn Aerial Ladder (Ex-Truck 4)
- Rescue 1 - 2018 Seagrave Attacker / Rescue One Heavy Rescue
- Squad 1 (Spare) - 2006 Pierce Lance 1250gpm./500gal. Rescue Pumper (Ex-Squad 1)
- Squad 2A (Spare) - 1995 Pierce Lance 1250/500 (Ex-Squad 2)
- Car 31 (Chief of Dept) - 2015 Chevrolet Tahoe
- Car 32 (Deputy Chief) - 2012 Chevrolet Tahoe SUV (Ex-Car 39)
- Car 32A (Spare/Reserve) - 2004 Chevrolet Tahoe (Ex-Car 32)
- Car 33 (East Battalion Chief) - 2011 Ford F-350 Pickup Truck
- Car 33A (Spare) - 2003 Chevrolet Suburban 2500 (Ex-Car33)
- Car 34 (West Battalion Chief) - 2011 Ford F-350 Pickup Truck
- Car 36 (Director of Training) 2016 Chevrolet Traverse
- Car 37 (Fire Marshall) 2016 Chevrolet Traverse
- Car 38 (Assistant Chief-Administration) 2021 Chevrolet Suburban
- Car 39 (Assistant Chief-Operations) 2016 Chevrolet Tahoe
- Car 43 - 1996 Ford Superduty / Shops (Ex-Emergency 4)
- Car 44 - 1970 International Harvester / Shops (Ex-Fox 1, Crash 1)
- Car 47 / Brush 1 - 1996 Ford Superduty / Shops (Ex-Emergency 4 / Car 43 (Foam))
- Car 50 - 2011 Ford F-350 Pick Up (Ex-Emergency 1)
- Car 50A -1986 International (Ex-Tactical Unit 2, Hazmat 1)
- Car 51 (Supr of Apparatus) 2015 Chevrolet Silverado 2500HD
- Car 52 (Mechanic) 2015 Chevrolet Silverado 2500HD
- Car 95 (Supervisor of Fire Investigations) 2015 Chevrolet 2500HD (Ex-Car 47/Brush 1)
- Emergency Unit 1 - 2022 Chevrolet Suburban
- Emergency Unit 2 - 2021 Chevrolet Suburban
- Emergency Unit 3 - 2017 Chevrolet Suburban (Ex-Emergency 1A)
- EMS 5 - (Supervisor of EMS) 2016 Chevrolet Tahoe
- Emergency Unit 1A (Spare) - 2006 Ford Expedition (Ex-EMS 5, Car 36)
- Emergency Unit 2A (Spare) - 2011 Ford F-350 Pick Up Truck (Ex-Emergency 1A)
- Haz-Mat. Unit 1 - 2007 Sterling Acterra/American LaFrance Medium-Duty Hazmat Unit
- Rehab. Unit 1 - 2014 Freightliner M2/2004 ALF Medic Master Ambulance
- SOC 1 - 2009 Freightliner M2 Prime Mover (Ex. Car 49, Prime Mover)

== Rank structure ==
=== Staff Chiefs ===
- Chief Of Department
- Assistant Chief of Administration
- Assistant Chief of Operations

=== Fire Suppression personnel ===
- Deputy Chief
- Battalion Chief
- Captain
- Lieutenant
- Firefighter 1st Grade
- Firefighter 2nd Grade
- Firefighter 3rd Grade
- Probationary Firefighter

=== Fire Marshals Office personnel ===
- Fire Marshal
- Deputy Fire Marshal
- Supervisor Of Fire Investigations
- Life Safety Compliance Officer
- Public Assembly Inspector
- Fire Inspector/Investigator

=== Training Division personnel ===
- Director Of Training/Safety
- Drillmaster
- EMS Supervisor
- Assistant Drillmaster

== Controversy ==
In 2009 eighteen city firefighters, seventeen of whom were white and one of whom was Hispanic, brought suit against the department under Title VII of the Civil Rights Act of 1964 after they had passed the test for promotions to management positions and the city declined to promote them. New Haven officials invalidated the test results because none of the black firefighters scored high enough to be considered for the positions. City officials stated that they feared a lawsuit over the test's disproportionate exclusion of certain racial groups from promotion under the controversial "disparate impact" theory of liability.
