= Elizabeth R. Hooker House =

Historic house in Connecticut, United States

- U.S. National Register of Historic Places
- U.S. Historic district – Contributing property
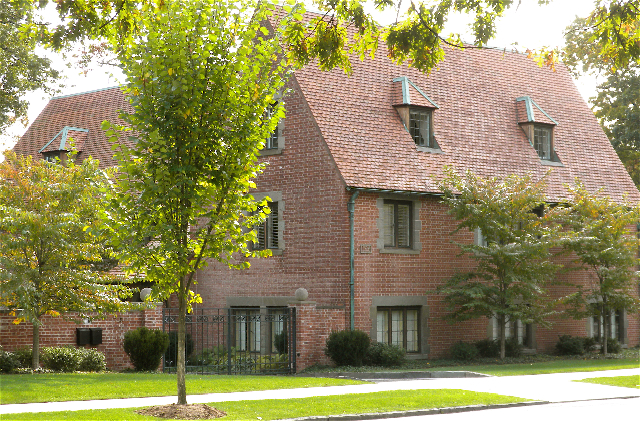

- Location within Connecticut Location within the United States
- Location: 123 Edgehill Road, New Haven, Connecticut
- Coordinates: 41°19′57″N 72°55′00″W
- Area: 1 acre (0.40 ha)
- Built: 1914
- Architectural style: English Arts and Crafts
- Part of: Prospect Hill Historic District (ID79002670)
- NRHP reference No.: 09000695

Significant dates
- Added to NRHP: May 27, 2010
- Designated CP: November 2, 1979

The Elizabeth R. Hooker House is a historic house at 123 Edgehill Road in New Haven, Connecticut. It is a 2 1/2-story brick English-style Arts and Crafts suburban villa designed by Delano and Aldrich and built in 1914 for Elizabeth R. Hooker (1874–1965). Hooker was a 20th-century progressive activist, scholar, and writer in areas such as women's rights, public health care, and historic preservation. The house was added to the National Register of Historic Places in 2010.

== Description and history ==
The Elizabeth R. Hooker House stands in New Haven's Prospect Hill neighborhood, at the northeast corner of Edgehill Road and Ogden Street. It is a 2 1/2-story brick L-shaped brick building, with bluestone trim, metal casement windows, and a tiled roof. A period three-car garage stands at the far corner of the property, and a walled garden extends along the property's Ogden Street frontage. These elements are all part of the original Delano and Aldrich design, as are other elements of the landscaping. The interior retains many period finishes and features, including a monumental main staircase, builtin bookcases in one of the downstairs parlors, and cabinetry in the butler's pantry.

Built in 1914, it is one the state's only known examples of an Arts and Crafts-style residence. Delano and Aldrich, by then a well-established practice, had executed numerous commissions in New Haven by the time Elizabeth "Bess" Hooker retained them. Hooker, a scion of Connecticut industrial leaders, may have sought this style of residence based on extensive travel in Europe, particularly England. There is some evidence that landscape designer Marian Coffin contributed to the landscape design, although the nature of her contributions is not known.

Bess Hooker was a prominent figure in the early 20th-century efforts to gain the vote for women, and was also active in a variety of other progressive causes, including wider access to birth control, historic preservation, and the establishment of Sleeping Giant State Park in neighboring Hamden. Hooker lived here until her death in 1965.

== Gallery ==
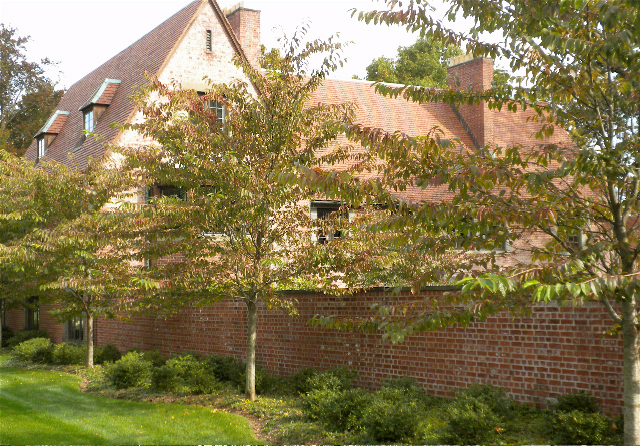
Elizabeth R. Hooker House, Edgehill Rd., New Haven

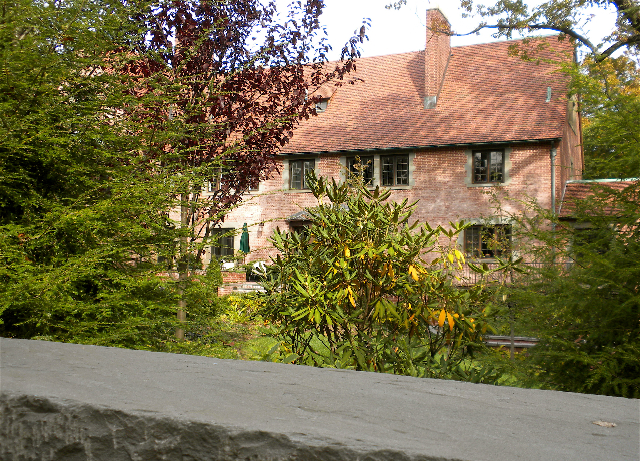
Elizabeth R. Hooker House, Edgehill Rd., New Haven

== See also ==
- National Register of Historic Places listings in New Haven, Connecticut
