= John Cook House =

Historic house in Connecticut, United States

- U.S. National Register of Historic Places
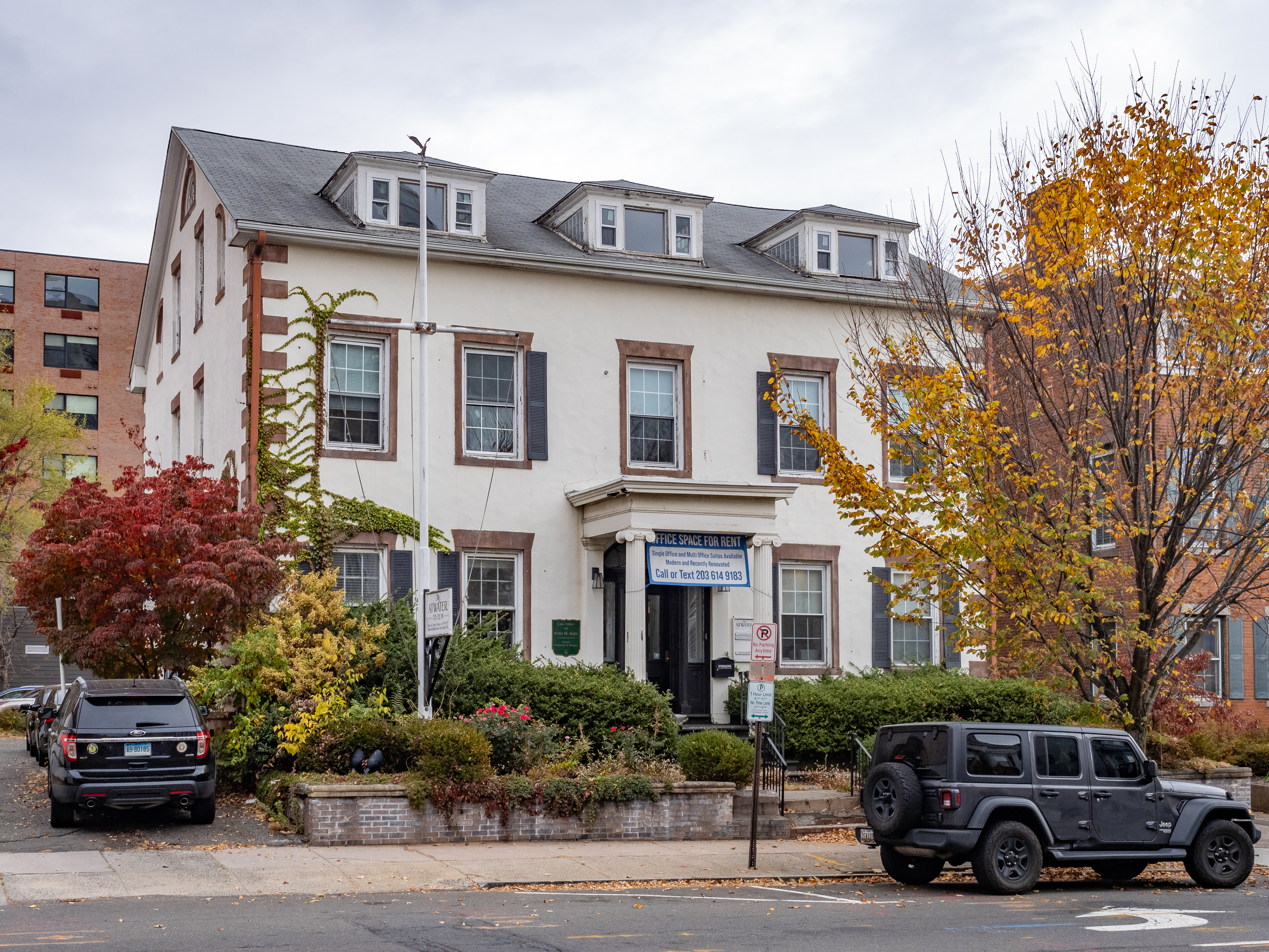
- (2024)

- Location within Connecticut Location within the United States
- Location: 35 Elm Street, New Haven, Connecticut
- Coordinates: 41°18′26″N 72°55′21″W
- Area: 2.4 acres (0.97 ha)
- Built: c. 1807
- Architectural style: Federal
- NRHP reference No.: 83003576
- Added to NRHP: November 3, 1983

The John Cook House is a historic house at 35 Elm Street in New Haven, Connecticut. Built about 1807, it is one of the city's oldest surviving stone buildings, further notable for a parade of locally or statewide prominent residents. The house was listed on the National Register of Historic Places in 1983.

== Description and history ==
The John Cook House is located two blocks east of the New Haven Green in downtown New Haven, on the north side of Elm Street between Orange and State Streets. It is 2 1/2 stories in height, built out of ashlar cut red sandstone that is stuccoed except for the corner quoining blocks, and covered by a gabled roof. The roof face of the roof is pierced by three low hip-roof dormers. Windows are rectangular sash, arranged symmetrically around a center entrance in openings with stone sills and lintels. The entrance is flanked by sidelight windows and sheltered by a projecting portico with Ionic columns.

John Cook, a local tailor and merchant, purchased land for the house in 1805 and 1806, and built it soon afterward. It is one of the oldest stone buildings in New Haven; Timothy Dwight reported in 1800 that the city had none. Cook sold the house in 1814 to Captain James Goodrich, a privateer in the War of 1812. Goodrich had the building's third floor ballroom built; this work is attributed to a locally prominent master builder, David Hoadley. Hoadley was later prominent in business, running the railroad that supplanted the Farmington Canal. In 1858 the house was purchased by Charles Atwater, another prominent businessman and politician who served in the state legislature and was a candidate for Governor of Connecticut. Its next owner, Dr. Charles Lindsley, was a leading figure in the development of public health in the city and state, whose Department of Health he founded. From 1919 to 1967, the house was owned by the local Visiting Nurse Association.

== Current Use ==
35 Elm Street is currently used as a professional office space and is now marked as "The Atwater" building, referencing Charles Atwater a state senator and railroad businessman who owned the property from 1859 to 1877. In recent years the interior space of the building appears to have been partially renovated.

== See also ==
- Caroline Nicoll House, next door
- National Register of Historic Places listings in New Haven, Connecticut
