= Senator Atwater =

Senator Atwater may refer to:

- Bob Atwater (fl. 2000s–2010s), North Carolina State Senate
- Charles Atwater (1815–1891), Connecticut State Senate
- Jeff Atwater (born 1958), Florida State Senate
- John Wilbur Atwater (1840–1910), North Carolina State Senate
