= Raynham =

Raynham is the name of multiple places

United States:

- Raynham, Massachusetts
  - Raynham Center, Massachusetts
- Raynham (New Haven, Connecticut), historic house
- Raynham, North Carolina

United Kingdom:

- Raynham, Norfolk
  - site of Raynham Hall

== See also ==
- Rainham (disambiguation)
