= Rainham =

Rainham may refer to:

- Rainham, Kent, Medway, England
  - Rainham railway station (Kent)
- Rainham, London, London Borough of Havering, England
  - Rainham railway station (London)

== See also ==
- Raynham (disambiguation)
