= M. Armstrong and Company Carriage Factory =

- U.S. National Register of Historic Places
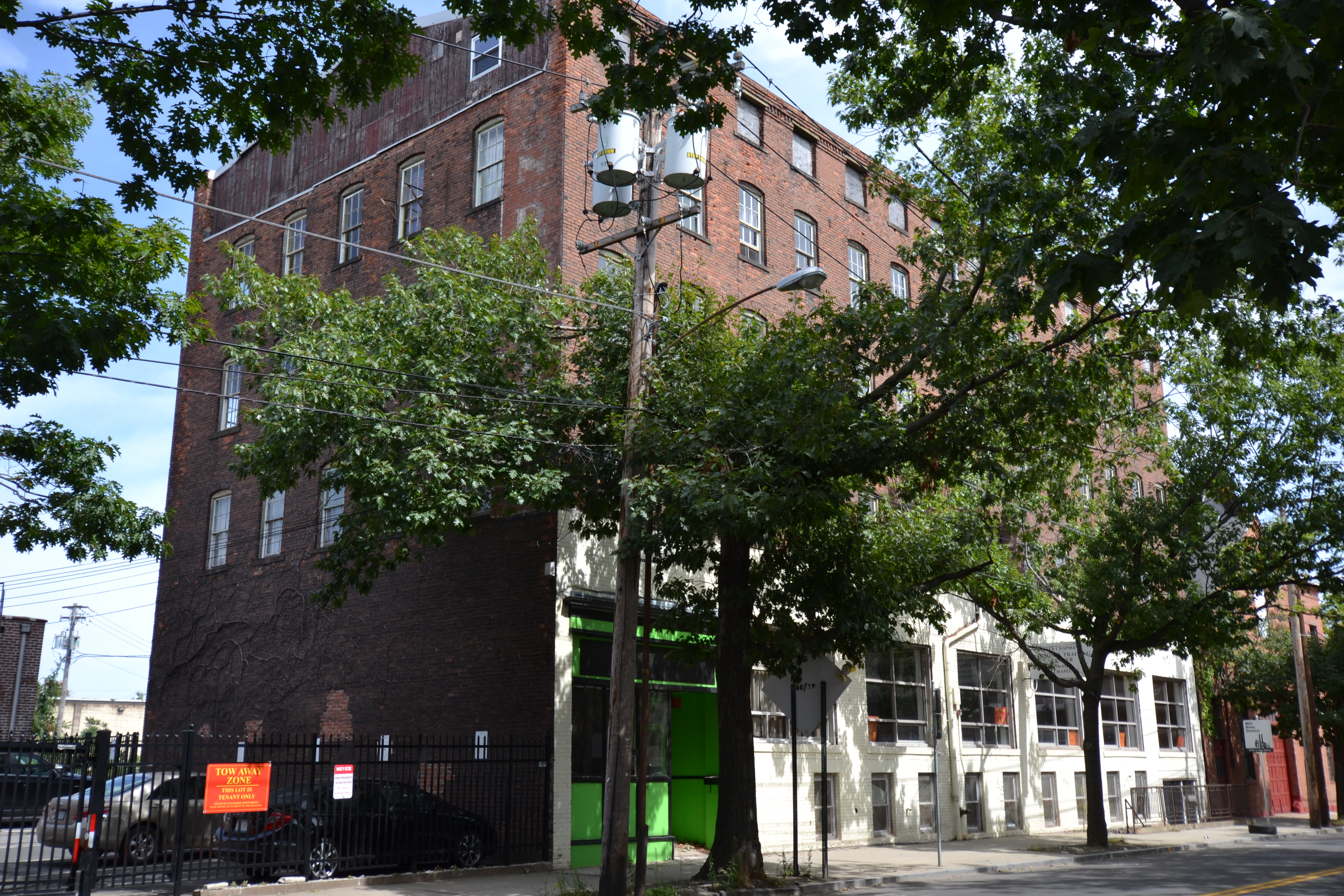

- Location within Connecticut Location within the United States
- Location: 433 Chapel Street, New Haven, Connecticut
- Coordinates: 41°18′13″N 72°54′44″W
- Area: 0.3 acres (0.12 ha)
- Built: 1882
- Architectural style: Industrial vernacular
- NRHP reference No.: 11000612
- Added to NRHP: August 31, 2011

The M. Armstrong and Company Carriage Factory is a historic carriage factory building at 433 Chapel Street in New Haven, Connecticut. Built in 1882, it is one of a small number of surviving 19th-century carriage factories in a city that once had more than 50 such businesses. It was listed on the National Register of Historic Places in 2011.

== Description and history ==
The former M. Armstrong and Company carriage factory is located in New Haven's industrial Mill River, on the north side of Church Street between Hamilton and South Wallace Streets. It is a four-story brick structure, roughly 100 by 45 feet (30 m × 14 m), with a flat roof. Its construction is typical of late 19th-century factories, with rows of sash windows (many now boarded over) set in segmented-arch openings. The long street-facing ground floor level has six bays of grouped casement windows, with the main entrance in a seventh bay at the left end.

Montgomery Armstrong was a blacksmith who came to New Haven in 1842, and was probably employed in the city's carriage-making industry. The city was at the time one of the nation's leading producers of carriages. In 1859, Armstrong entered a partnership with George and Thomas Alling, owners of a lumber business, and began his own carriage making business. Initially located on Temple Street, the company survived a decline in business brought on by the American Civil War, specializing in high-quality carriages for the New York City hotel trade as well as family-oriented models. The company's construction of this building in 1882 represented part of a shift in the city's industrial production east of the downtown area.

The company was taken over by Armstrong's sons upon is death in 1904, but was unable to survive the shift from carriages to automobiles, and closed in 1927. The next occupant of the building was the John Smith Company, a wire manufacturer who operated on the premises until its closure in 1963. It then housed a variety of smaller industrial businesses. It served in part as the home of the print edition of the New Haven Independent between 1986 and 1989. Taken over by the city, the building was sold to a developer in 2002, but financing and other issues delayed redevelopment of the building as a residential commercial property.

== See also ==
- National Register of Historic Places listings in New Haven, Connecticut
