= William Pinto House =

Historic house in Connecticut, United States

- U.S. National Register of Historic Places
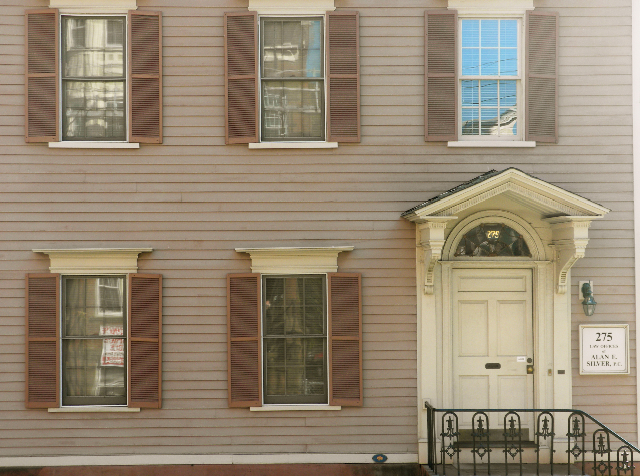

- Location within Connecticut Location within the United States
- Location: 283 Orange Street, New Haven, Connecticut
- Coordinates: 41°18′31″N 72°55′19″W
- Area: 0.1 acres (0.040 ha)
- Built: 1810
- Architectural style: Federal
- NRHP reference No.: 85002316
- Added to NRHP: September 12, 1985

The William Pinto House, also known as William Pinto-Eli Whitney House, is a historic house at 283 Orange Street in New Haven, Connecticut. It is a Federal-style building of post-and-beam construction, and was built in 1810 for John Cook, a merchant. It is rare and unusual for its design, which places the gable end facing the street, rather than to the side as was more typical in the Federal period. It is historically notable for its second owner, William Pinto, a member of one of New Haven's leading Jewish families, and for its third occupant, Eli Whitney, who leased the house from Pinto in the later years of his life. The house was listed on the National Register of Historic Places in 1985. It now houses professional offices.

In 2022, the house was moved a short distance north to make way for construction of a multistory building. Its structural and architectural integrity was preserved during the move.

== Description and history ==
The William Pinto House is located a short way east of the New Haven Green in central New Haven, on the east side of Orange Street between Elm and Wall Streets. It is a 2 1/2-story wood rame structure, with a gabled roof and clapboarded exterior. Its street-facing facade is three bays wide, with the main entrance in the rightmost bay. Sash windows occupy the other bays, and are topped by corniced lintels. There is a small Palladian window in the gable end above. The entrance is flanked by pilasters and topped by a half-round transom, and is sheltered by a gabled hood with elongated carved brackets. The interior retains main finishes including fireplace surrounds and trim.

When this house was built in 1810, Orange Street was a fashionable upper-class residential area; it has since been transformed into a largely commercial district of the city's downtown. It was built for John Cook, a prominent local merchant, who sold it in 1812 to William Pinto, a member of one of the first Jewish families to settled in New Haven. Pinto served in the state militia during the American Revolutionary War, and was one of its most successful West Indies merchants. Pinto rented the house to inventor Eli Whitney in 1819, which he occupied until his death in 1825. Architecturally, the house is a rare surviving example of a Federal style house with a front-facing gable.

After its listing on the National Register in 1985, the main building underwent some renovations, including the replacement of its front door and the removal of its back stairs. A modern single-story addition, present at the time of listing, was replaced in 1987 by a two-story brick addition. In 2022, the addition was demolished, and the main structure was moved a short distance north on Orange Street, to make way for a multistory building. The building was placed on a new foundation, lined with stones taken from the original foundation to retain its period appearance.

== Gallery ==
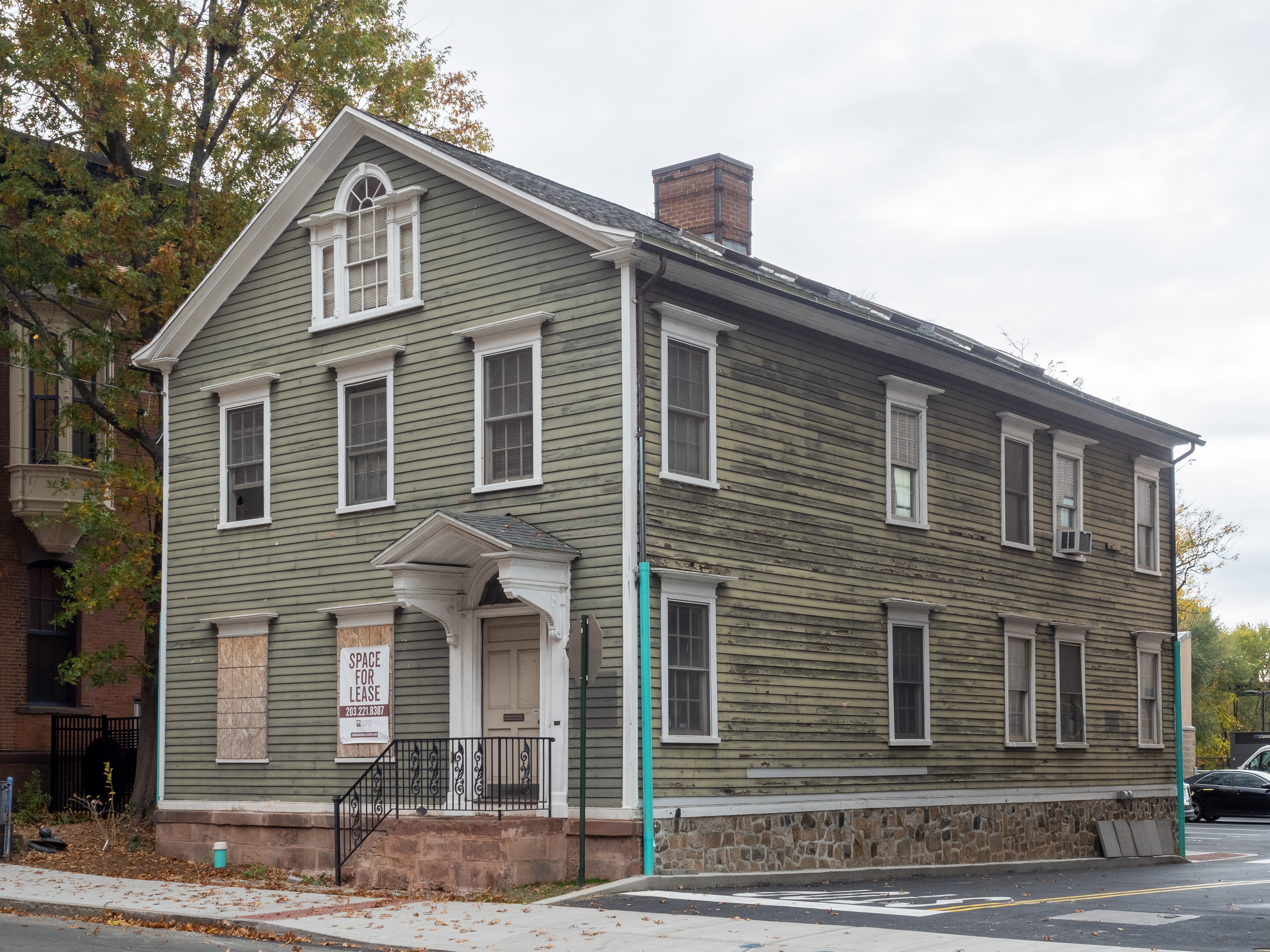
As Seen in 2024

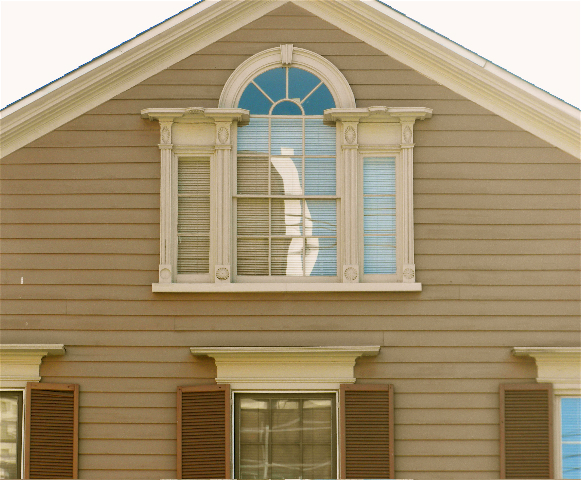
Palladian window in the gable.

== See also ==
- National Register of Historic Places listings in New Haven, Connecticut
