= New Haven Clock Company Factory =

- U.S. National Register of Historic Places
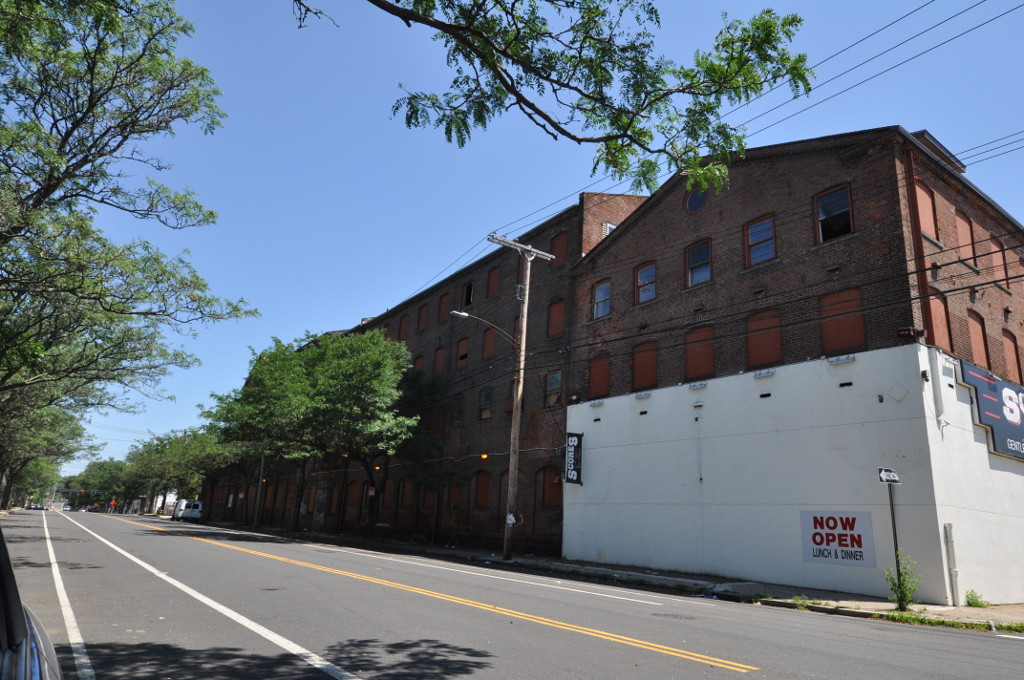

- Location within Connecticut Location within the United States
- Location: 133 Hamilton Street, New Haven, Connecticut
- Coordinates: 41°18′26″N 72°54′45″W
- Area: 1.9 acres (0.77 ha)
- Built: 1866
- Architectural style: Italianate
- NRHP reference No.: 100000761
- Added to NRHP: March 20, 2017

The New Haven Clock Company Factory is a historic industrial complex at 133 Hamilton Street in New Haven, Connecticut. Developed between 1866 and 1937, it consists of ten interconnected brick buildings that are the surviving elements of a major clock-making business that operated here until 1956. The property was listed on the National Register of Historic Places in 2017.

== Description and history ==
The former New Haven Clock Company factory is located in New Haven's industrial Wooster Square area, east of downtown. It is set on just under 2 acres (0.81 ha) of land bounded by Hamilton Street, St. John Street, and Wallace Street on the west, south, and east sides. Its ten buildings are organized in a C shape, with the open side facing Wallace Street to the east. The southern part of the C is a single large building, where final assembly of the company's clocks took place, while the other buildings housed other elements of the clock-making process. Most of the buildings are three or four stories in height, with brick construction typical of the late 19th and early 20th centuries. Common features include segmented-arch window openings and low-pitch gabled roofs.

The New Haven Clock Company had its origins in the clock manufactory of Chauncey Jerome, an important figure in the early 19th-century development of the clock industry in Connecticut. Jerome's principal factory was in Bristol, and he opened a case manufacturing plant on this site in 1844. His nephew, Hiram Camp, organized the New Haven Clock Company in 1853, to produce components for Jerome. Jerome's business collapsed in 1856, and Camp purchased its assets with the help of other investors. New Haven Clock was merged into the American Clock Company in 1859, but continued to operate under its own name. The plant was devastated by a major fire in 1866, but quickly rebuilt; the oldest surviving elements of the complex date to this reconstruction. In the early 20th-century, the company flourished under the management of Walter Camp, and was one of the largest clockmakers in the world, and occupied 28 buildings. The company produced timing fuses and relays for mines during World War II, and resumed clock production after the war ended. It suffered financial reverses, mainly due to increasing foreign competition, and closed in 1956. Its major facility on the west side of Hamilton Street was demolished in the 1960s.

In August 2023, the New Haven Housing Authority voted to convert the factory into affordable housing. The plans include converting the building into over 100 apartments to help with the current housing crisis.

== See also ==
- National Register of Historic Places listings in New Haven, Connecticut
