= Prospect Hill Historic District (New Haven, Connecticut) =

Neighborhood in New Haven, Connecticut

- U.S. National Register of Historic Places
- U.S. Historic district
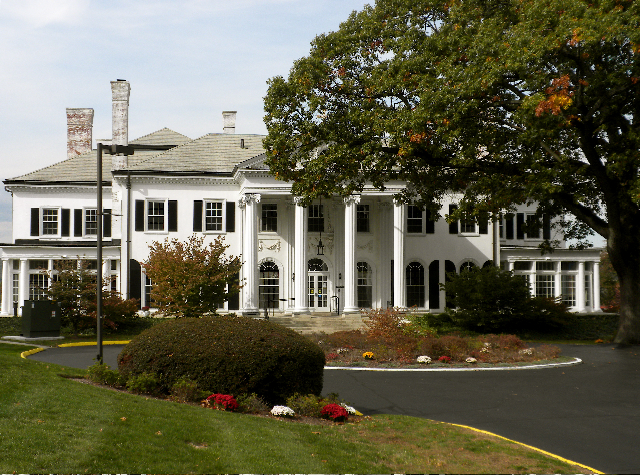
- Palladian Louis Stoddard House (1905), 700 Prospect Street, Peabody and Stearns, Boston, now on the campus of Albertus Magnus College.

- Location within Connecticut Location within the United States
- Location: Prospect Street and St. Ronan Street, New Haven, Connecticut
- Coordinates: 41°19′30″N 72°55′15″W
- Area: 185 acres (75 ha)
- Built: 1890
- Architect: Brown & von Beren; Multiple
- Architectural style: Colonial Revival, Tudor Revival, Queen Anne
- NRHP reference No.: 79002670
- Added to NRHP: November 2, 1979

The Prospect Hill Historic District is an irregularly-shaped 185-acre (75 ha) historic district in New Haven, Connecticut. The district encompasses most of the residential portion of the Prospect Hill neighborhood.

The district includes two U.S. National Historic Landmark properties which are separately listed on the National Register: the Othniel C. Marsh House and the Connecticut Agricultural Experiment Station. The district was listed on the National Register of Historic Places in 1979. In 1979, it included 238 buildings deemed to contribute to the historic character of the area.

The district is significant primarily for its architecture. It includes major collections of Queen Anne style architecture in the United States, Shingle Style architecture, Colonial Revival architecture, and Tudor Revival architecture. Numerous other styles are also represented.

Architects and firms represented include Boston's Peabody and Stearns and R. Clipston Sturgis; New York's Grosvenor Atterbury, Donn Barber, J.C. Cady & Co., George S. Chappell, Delano & Aldrich, Ewing & Chappell, James Gamble Rogers, Rossiter & Muller, and Heathcote Woolsey; Philadelphia's Mantle Fielding; Connecticut's Henry Austin and numerous others.

Selected contributing properties in the district are:

- John M. Davies house, 393 Prospect Street, an 1868 Second French Empire Revival house designed by Henry Austin, the district's primary example of the Victorian estates from the earliest period of the district's settlement, now known as Betts House
- Othniel C. Marsh House, 360 Prospect Street, 1878, mixed Richardsonian Romanesque & Queen Anne, designed by J.C. Cady & Co.
- Connecticut Agricultural Experiment Station, 1875–c.1950, a six-building property and National Historic Landmark
- Anna L. Graves House, 35 Autumn Street, c.1890, a Queen Anne house
- 259-61, 262, 266, 269, 270-272, and 278 Canner Street, c. 1900-1910, six Colonial Revival houses
- 237 East Rock Road, c. 1910, Colonial Revival with Federal details, former home of Yale University president A. Whitney Griswold
- Silk House, Colonial Revival, c. 1915, at 75 Autumn Street, designed by architects Brown & von Beren
- 152, 166 and 180 East Rock Road, three Shingle style houses
- Celentano Public School, 370 Canner Street, Victoria, originally built as Yale's first observatory
- 80 Cliff Street, a Queen Anne house, c. 1890
- Ellsworth Foote House at 145 East Rock Road, and 152, 166, 180 East Rock Road, four Shingle Style houses
- 149 and 156 East Rock Road, two Queen Anne houses

Non-contributing properties include:

- four Yale Divinity School dormitories at 352 Canner Street, from 1957, whose "economically designed modern blocks contrast with the neighborhood character"

In 2002, application was made for a building that was located at 285 Prospect Street to be moved to 380 Edwards Street, while retaining its contributing building status. It is a building designed by R. Clipston Sturgis. It was approved.

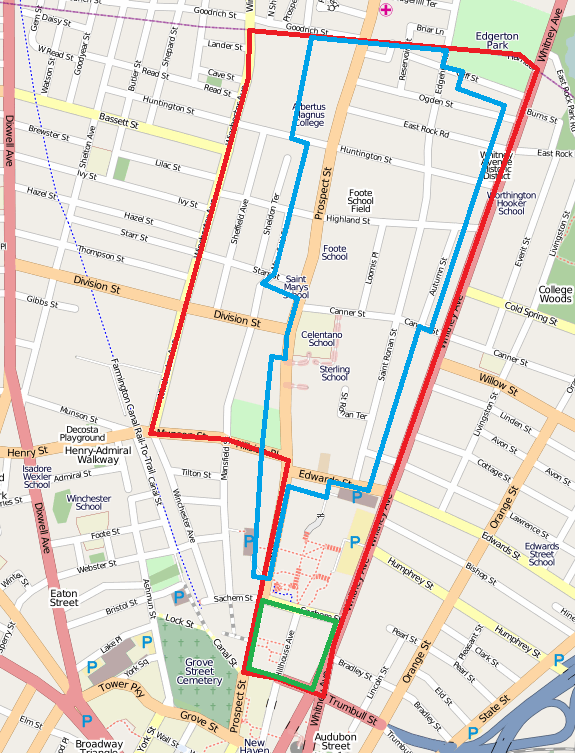
Approximate boundary of the district, in blue. Also shown are: in green, the Hillhouse Avenue Historic District and in red, the Prospect Hill neighborhood

== Relationship to neighborhoods ==
The historic district includes most of New Haven's Prospect Hill neighborhood. The district borders are drawn irregularly to exclude modern construction, and also to exclude properties fronting Whitney Avenue, which are included in the Whitney Avenue Historic District. It excludes the entire area of the Hillhouse Avenue Historic District, an area that was originally residential, and now is mostly Yale University-owned, and which included within the official neighborhood planning maps for Prospect Hill. The historic district also excludes the Edgerton historic district, the New Haven portion of which has been included in the official neighborhood planning maps for Prospect Hill.

Among other exclusions, the district excludes Yale University's relatively modern buildings on Science Hill. It excludes several Yale graduate student housing facilities (the Whitehall Apartment Complex, the Mansfield Apartments, and the Esplanade Apartments), while at 352 Canner Street, the district includes four dormitory buildings of the Yale Divinity School.

The district extends to the south to include historic houses that are now Yale offices along the west side of Prospect Street south of Hillside Place.

== Gallery ==
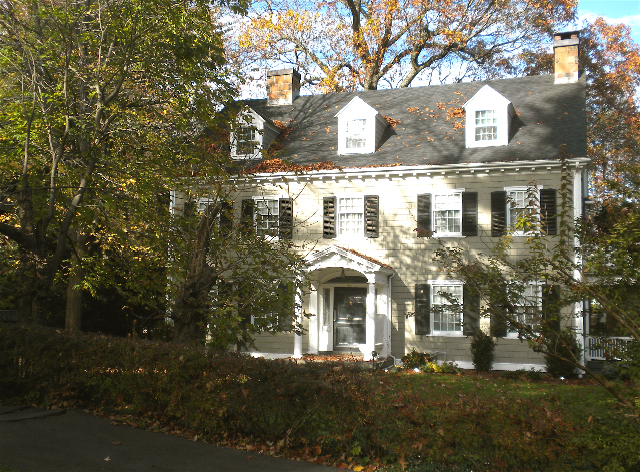
237 East Rock Road

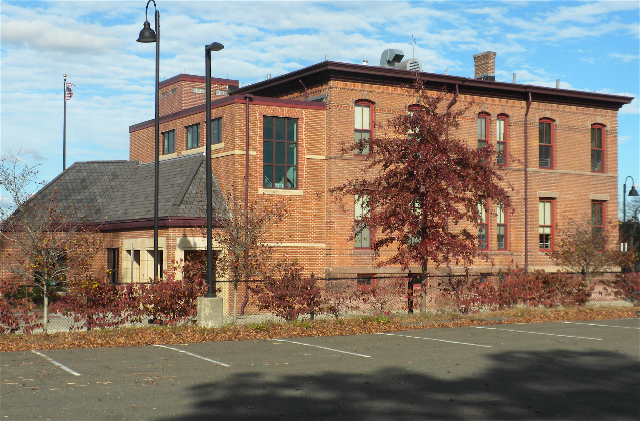
Yale University's Winchester Observatory (from 1873) with an addition by Celentano School, 370 Canner Street

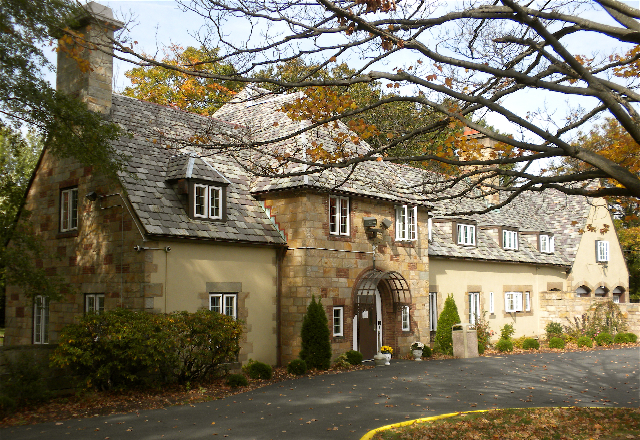
George Berger House (1927), 810 Prospect Street, Douglas Orr, now on the campus of Albertus Magnus College.

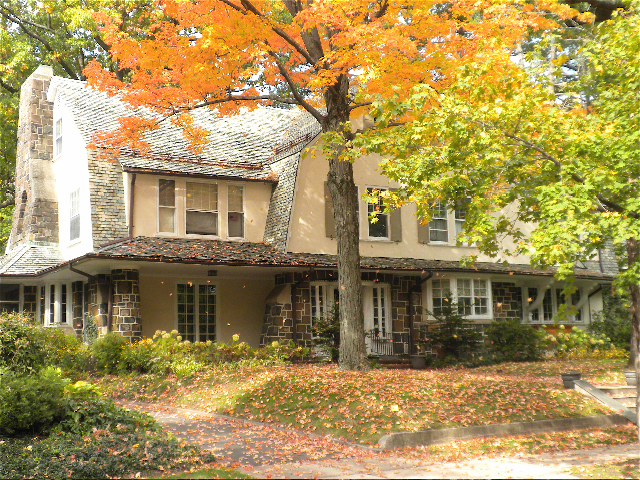
396 St. Ronan Street (1910), Brown & von Beren.

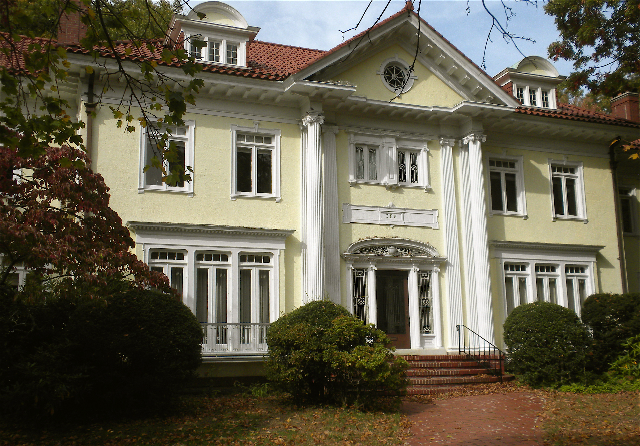
352 St. Ronan Street

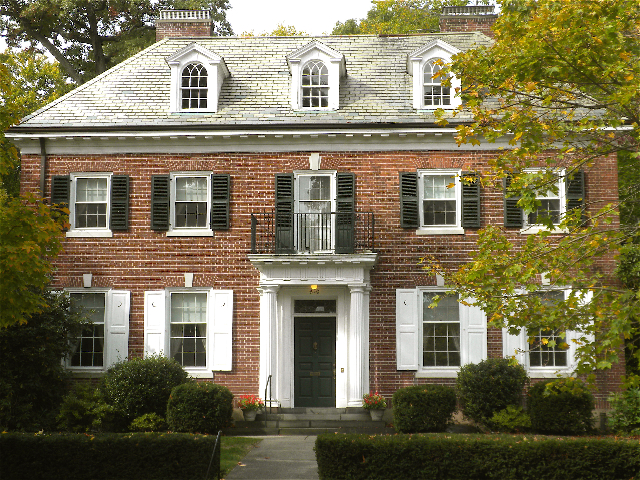
Georgian 450 St. Ronan Street (1913), James Gamble Rogers, New York.

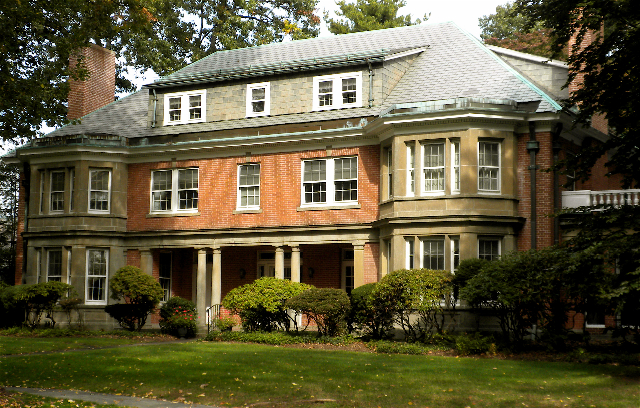
275 East Rock Road (1920), George S. Chappell, New York.

== See also ==
- National Register of Historic Places listings in New Haven, Connecticut
