= Morris Cove Historic District =

Historic district in Connecticut, United States

- U.S. National Register of Historic Places
- U.S. Historic district
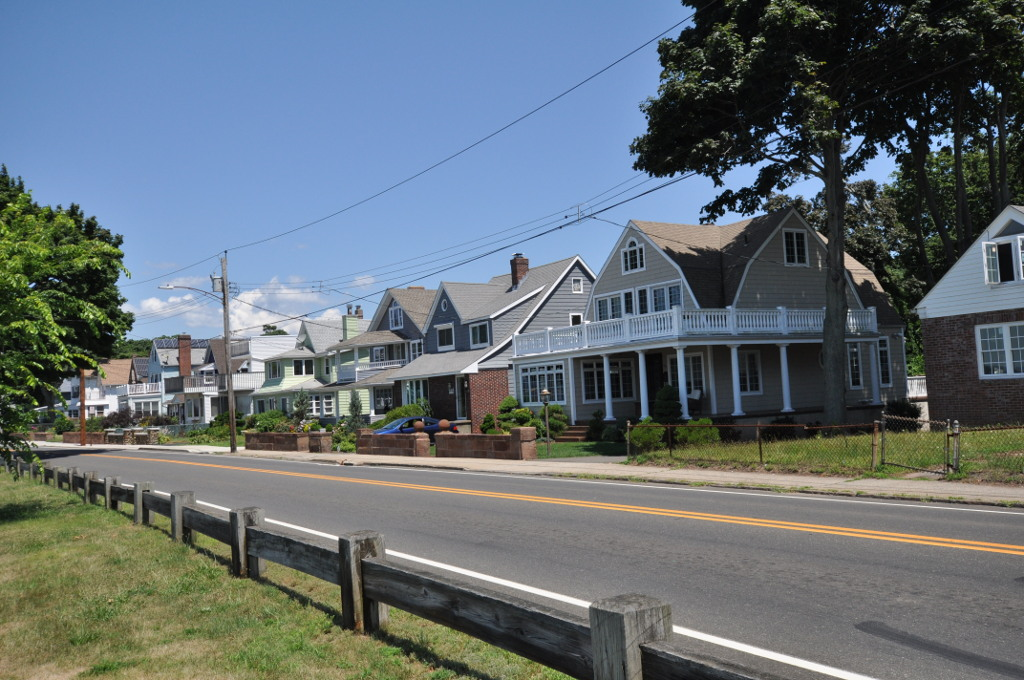
- Houses on Townsend Avenue

- Location within Connecticut Location within the United States
- Location: Between Dean & Myron Streets, Morris Causeway & Townsend Avenue, New Haven, Connecticut
- Coordinates: 41°15′52″N 72°53′41″W
- Area: 61 acres (25 ha)
- NRHP reference No.: 100002320
- Added to NRHP: April 19, 2018

The Morris Cove Historic District encompasses a former summer resort area in eastern New Haven, Connecticut. Bounded in the north by Myron Street, the south by Morris Causeway and Lighthouse Road, and on the east by the East Haven town line, the area was developed as a coastal summer community before being transformed into a streetcar suburb in the second quarter of the 20th century. It contains a high concentration of quality residential architecture from the first half of the century, and was listed on the National Register of Historic Places in 1985.

== Description and history ==
Morris Cove was a rural agricultural area of East Haven until after the American Civil War, at which time local landowners began to open their homes and build small hotels to serve tourists. One of the oldest such surviving houses now stands at 265 Townsend Avenue; built in the 1870s, it was then known as the Pioneer Guest House. In 1881, Morris Cove and adjacent areas were transferred from East Haven to New Haven, but retained a measure of civic autonomy. By the early 1900s there were still relatively few year-round residents, but there was a school and a fire station, and the community maintained its own police force. The transition to a year-round community began in the early 1900s, when a trolley line was run down Townsend Avenue. The area was developed more fully as a residential area, with a small commercial hub near the southern end of the cove.

The historic district consists of a densely built grid of street oriented toward the cove, which forms its western boundary. Between Townsend Avenue and the cove in the northern half of the district lies Pardee Seawall Park, a city park that extends northward to Fort Nathan Hale. Most of the houses in the district are of wood frame construction, and are in styles popular in the early 20th century: Colonial Revival, Craftsman, Bungalow, and Dutch Colonial. Interspersed are a number of examples of the older Italianate, Queen Anne, and Shingle styles from the last three decades of the 19th century. There are 341 historically significant buildings in the 61-acre (25 ha) district.

== See also ==
- National Register of Historic Places listings in New Haven, Connecticut
