= Scantlebury Skate Park =

Skatepark in New Haven, Connecticut

- Interactive map of Scantlebury Skate Park
- Type: concrete skatepark
- Location: Ella B. Scantlebury Park
- Nearest city: New Haven, Connecticut
- Coordinates: 41.31301°N 72.928341°W
- Created: 2020

Scantlebury Skate Park is a public skatepark built in Scantlebury Park in the Dixwell neighborhood of New Haven, Connecticut. The park opened in 2020.

== Park history ==
Ella B. Scantlebury Park was named after New Haven's first African-American and first woman City Treasurer, Ella Scantlebury.

=== Building campaign ===
The Scantlebury Skatepark was conceived of by two New Haven residents and skateboard enthusiasts, Steve Roberts and J. Joseph, Yale class of 2019. The city of New Haven supported the campaign. Roberts and Joseph garnered funding for their project with $50,000 from The Could Be Fund and a $25,000 donation from Yale's Schwarzman Center. Despite an initial pushback from some members of the community, the Scantlebury Skatepark opened in 2020 and is well used and loved by the community.

=== Construction ===
Bridgeport-based Rampage skateboard company built the skatepark.
