= Elisha Blackman Building =

- U.S. National Register of Historic Places
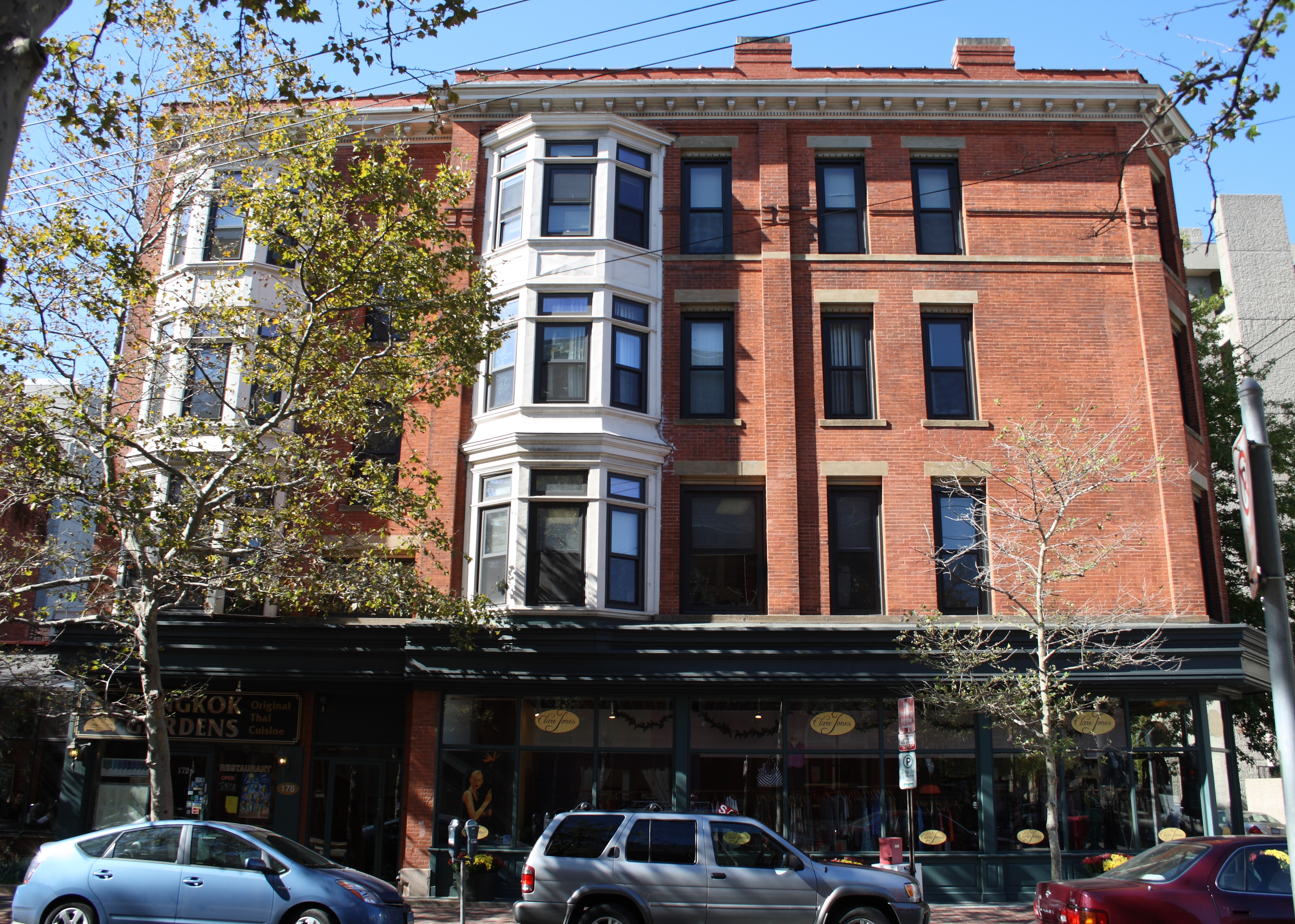

- Location within Connecticut Location within the United States
- Location: 176 York Street, New Haven, Connecticut
- Coordinates: 41°18′29″N 72°55′57″W
- Area: 0.2 acres (0.081 ha)
- Built: 1883
- NRHP reference No.: 78002863
- Added to NRHP: December 20, 1978

The Elisha Blackman Building, also known as the York-Chapel Building, is a historic mixed commercial-residential building at 176 York Street in the Downtown New Haven neighborhood of New Haven, Connecticut. Built in 1883, it is a finely crafted example of 19th-century commercial architecture, and is one of the few such buildings to survive in the city. It was listed on the National Register of Historic Places in 1978.

== Description and history ==
The Elisha Blackman Building is located at the southwest corner of York and Chapel Streets in downtown New Haven. It is a four-story masonry structure, built out of red brick with stone trim. The building has a trapezoidal shape rather than rectangular one due to the lot it occupies. The ground floor has one storefront and the main building entrance on the York Street facade, and three on that facing Chapel Street. The Chapel Street storefronts are separated by stone columns, while the York Street storefront has brick pilasters separating the storefront, building entrance, and the bays occupied by the corner store. The upper floors have most windows set in rectangular openings; there are projecting polygonal window bays on both facades. It has a metal clad cornice.

The building was constructed in 1883, on land that had previously been occupied by three houses. Its designer is unknown, but the craftsmanship and material quality is high. The building was an investment by Elisha Blackman, a carriage maker. In the 1920s, the second floor was adapted for professional offices instead of apartments, and the building facade was pushed out to the sidewalk, supported by lally columns and steel supports. There was a fire in the building in 1977 and the building was vacated.

== See also ==
- National Register of Historic Places listings in New Haven, Connecticut
