= East Shore, New Haven =

Neighborhood in New Haven, Connecticut

Coordinates: 41.270°N 72.895°W

East Shore is a neighborhood in the city of New Haven, Connecticut. The East Shore contains the Morris Cove Historic District. Its name is derived from its geographic location on the east side of New Haven Harbor. It is bordered on the north by Upson Terrace and The Annex neighborhood, on the east by the town of East Haven, on the west and south by Long Island Sound. The area contains several city parks, most notably Lighthouse Point Park (the main public beach of New Haven), East Shore Park, and Nathan Hale Park. Tweed-New Haven Airport is also located partly in the area. East Shore was originally part of the town of East Haven before being annexed by New Haven. The main thoroughfares of the neighborhood are Townsend Avenue (Route 337) and Woodward Avenue.
