= Ahavas Sholem Synagogue =

Historic former Reform synagogue in New Haven, Connecticut, US

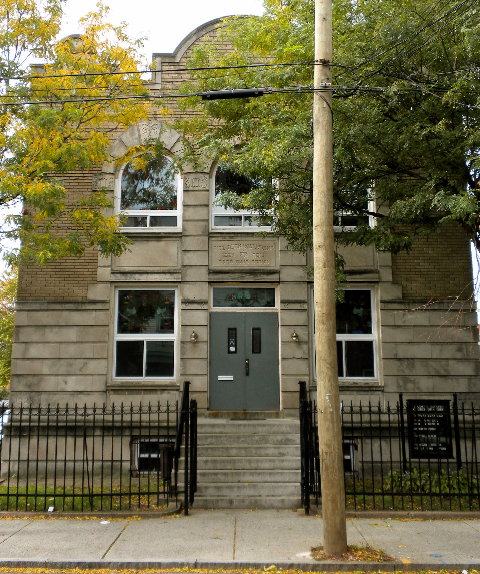

- Location of the former synagogue, now chapel, in Connecticut

Religion
- Affiliation: Orthodox Judaism (former); Church of Christ (current)
- Rite: Nusach Ashkenaz
- Ecclesiastical or organizational status: Synagogue (1928–c. 1960s); Chapel (current)
- Ownership: Thomas Hill Chapel Church of Christ
- Status: Closed (as a synagogue); Repurposed (as a chapel)

Location
- Location: 30 White Street, New Haven, Connecticut
- Country: United States
- Interactive map of Ahavas Sholem Synagogue
- Coordinates: 41°17′54″N 72°56′25″W

Architecture
- Type: Synagogue
- Style: Neoclassical
- Established: 1912 (as a congregation)
- Completed: 1928
- Materials: Masonry; limestone

Website
- thomaschapelchurch.org
- Ahavas Sholem Synagogue
- U.S. National Register of Historic Places
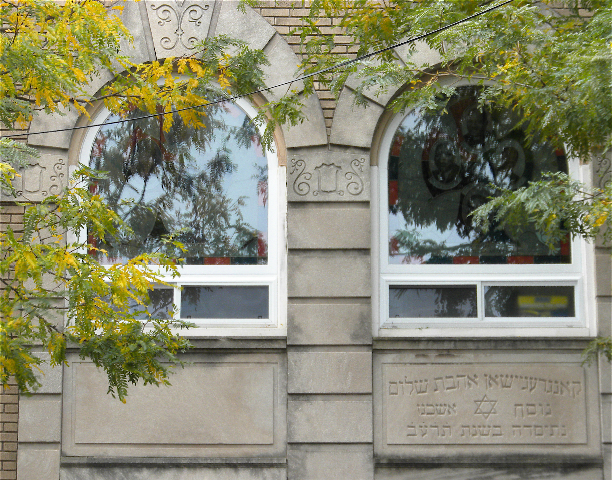
- Ahavas Sholem Synagogue, detail of façade. Inscription reads: "Congregation Ahavas Sholem; Ashkenazi tradition Founded in 5672 (1911–12). One of the founders and treasurer was Joseph Lurie"
- Area: less than one acre
- MPS: Historic Synagogues of Connecticut MPS
- NRHP reference No.: 95000559
- Added to NRHP: May 11, 1995

The Ahavas Sholem Synagogue, once known colloquially as The White Street Shul and now as the Thomas Hill Chapel, is a historic religious building at 30 White Street in New Haven, Connecticut. Built in 1928 for an Orthodox congregation founded in 1912, it is a distinctive example of a neighborhood synagogue with elaborate Neoclassical styling.

The synagogue was added to the National Register of Historic Places in 1995 as part of a multiple property listing of fifteen historic synagogues in Connecticut. The building is now home to Thomas Chapel, which is affiliated with the Church of Christ (Disciples of Christ).

== Description and history ==
The former Ahavas Sholem Synagogue stands on the west side of White Street, a short residential street in New Haven's The Hill neighborhood, southwest of downtown. It is a two-story masonry structure, built out of gold-colored brick with limestone trim. It has a particularly handsome Neoclassical façade, with limestone on the first level, which is continued on the second level around that floor's arched windows. A panel above the main entrance identifies the congregation and the year of the building's construction in the Hebrew calendar. Some of its original windows are incised with the Star of David, which is repeated in a rounded pediment at the roof level.

An Orthodox congregation was organized in this neighborhood in 1912. According to Orthodox practice, it was necessary to walk to Sabbath services, resulting in the founding of relatively small congregations such as this one. The building was erected in 1928, and was used by the congregation until most of its members moved away in the 1960s. The building is now occupied by a Christian congregation, the Thomas Hill Chapel Church of Christ.

The building was one of fifteen Connecticut synagogues added to the National Register of Historic Places in 1995 and 1996 in response to an unprecedented multiple submission, nominating nineteen synagogues.

== See also ==
- National Register of Historic Places listings in New Haven, Connecticut
