= West River (neighborhood) =

Neighborhood in New Haven, Connecticut

Coordinates: 41.3065°N 72.9505°W

West River is an official neighborhood of the city of New Haven, Connecticut. The neighborhood covers the part of the city east of the West River (boundary with the city of West Haven) and south of Chapel Street. Official planning maps run the eastern and southern boundaries run along Day Street, Legion Avenue, Winthrop Avenue, and Davenport Avenue. The neighborhood is bounded by the Edgewood (to the north), Dwight (north and east), and Hill (south) neighborhoods. The neighborhood includes West River Memorial Park and Evergreen Cemetery. The Hospital of St. Raphael is also included within the official neighborhood planning area.
