= Morris House (New Haven, Connecticut) =

Historic house in Connecticut, United States

- U.S. National Register of Historic Places
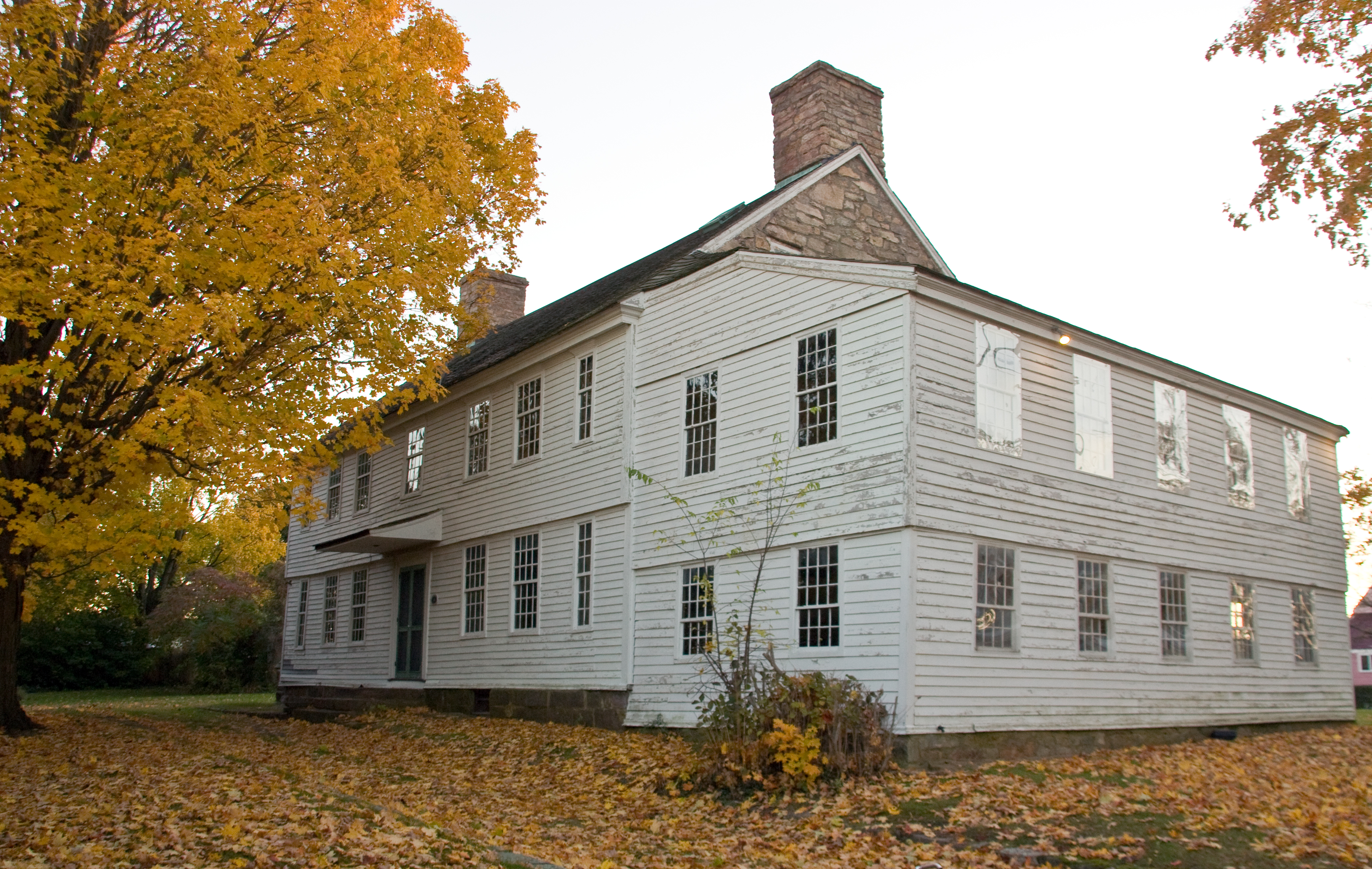

- Location within Connecticut Location within the United States
- Location: 325 Lighthouse Road, New Haven, Connecticut
- Coordinates: 41°15′17″N 72°53′46″W
- Area: 2 acres (0.81 ha)
- Built: 1700
- NRHP reference No.: 72001341
- Added to NRHP: December 4, 1972

The Pardee-Morris House, also known as John Morris House, is a historic house museum at 325 Lighthouse Road in New Haven, Connecticut. Probably built in the late 17th century, it is one of New Haven's oldest surviving buildings, and a good example of First Period colonial architecture. The building was listed on the National Register of Historic Places in 1972. It is now owned and operated by the New Haven Museum and Historical Society, and is open seasonally for events, classes and tours.

== Description and history ==
The Pardee-Morris House is located in New Haven's Morris Cove area, on the east side of New Haven Harbor. It is located at the southeast corner of Lighthouse Road and Morris Avenue. It is a large 2 1/2-story wood-frame structure, with stone end walls and chimneys, and a clapboarded exterior. The stone is laid in part with mortar of great antiquity, into which shells have been mixed. The main facade is seven bays wide, with sash windows arranged symmetrically about the main entrance. The entrance is sheltered by a modern shed-roof hood.

The oldest portions of the house are believed to date to the late 17th century, probably during the lifetime of Thomas Morris, the first colonial grantee of land in this area, or one of his sons. It was partially burned by the British in 1779. It remained in the Morris family until 1915, when it was sold to William Pardee. He only briefly occupied the house, and willed it to the historical society upon his death a few years later, along with an endowment for its care.

== See also ==
- National Register of Historic Places listings in New Haven, Connecticut
