= Caroline Nicoll House =

Historic house in Connecticut, United States

- U.S. National Register of Historic Places
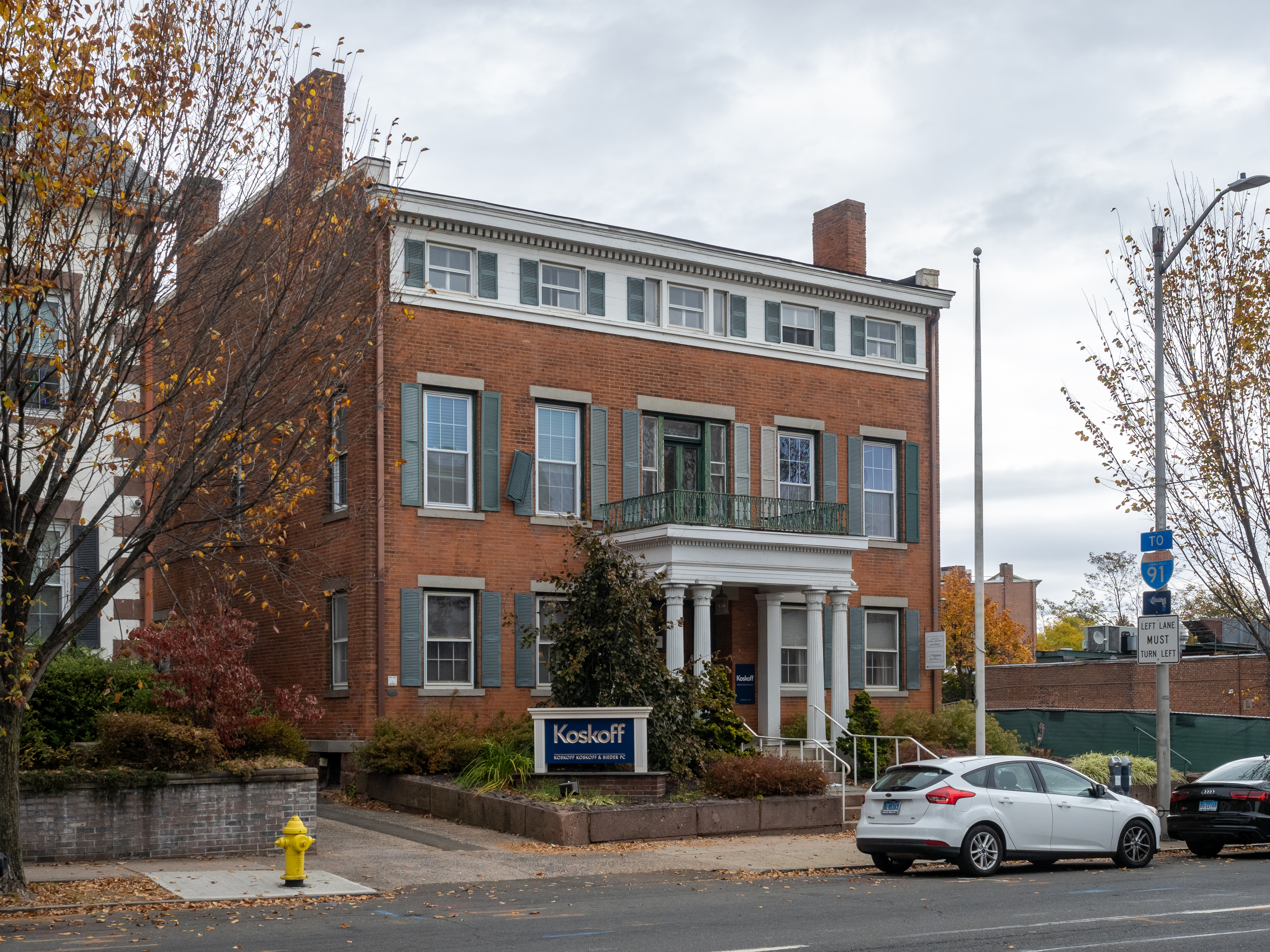
- (2024)

- Location within Connecticut Location within the United States
- Location: 27 Elm Street, New Haven, Connecticut
- Coordinates: 41°18′27.0″N 72°55′18.7″W
- Area: less than one acre
- Built: 1828
- Architectural style: Greek Revival, Federal
- NRHP reference No.: 83001283
- Added to NRHP: January 14, 1983

The Caroline Nicoll House is a historic house at 27 Elm Street in New Haven, Connecticut, USA. Built in 1828, it is a rare surviving example of an urban townhouse from that period, and a well-preserved example of transitional Federal-Greek Revival architecture. The house was listed on the National Register of Historic Places in 1983.

== Description and history ==
The Caroline Nicoll House is located in downtown New Haven, on the north side of Elm Street 1-1/2 blocks east of the New Haven Green. It is a 2 1/2-story brick structure, five bays wide, with stepped gable ends that include paired chimneys. The main entrance is sheltered by a portico supported by paired Egyptian-style columns. A two-story brick ell extends to the rear, further extended by a single-story addition. The interior retains many original features, including fireplace surrounds and trim, despite numerous alterations to adapt it for commercial use.

The house was built in 1828, and is a well-preserved local example of transitional Federal/Greek Revival architecture. It was built by Abraham Bishop as a gift for his daughter Caroline, on the occasion of her marriage to Charles Nicoll. Bishop was a prominent local statesman, and Nicoll a businessman. It remained in the Nicoll family until 1894. At which time it was purchased by a doctor, who added one of the ells to serve as his practice office. By the 1930s the building had been completely converted to use as professional offices. The house is also notable for surviving in an area that has seen significant changes due to urban renewal practices.

== See also ==
- National Register of Historic Places listings in New Haven, Connecticut
