= Fort Nathan Hale =

- U.S. National Register of Historic Places
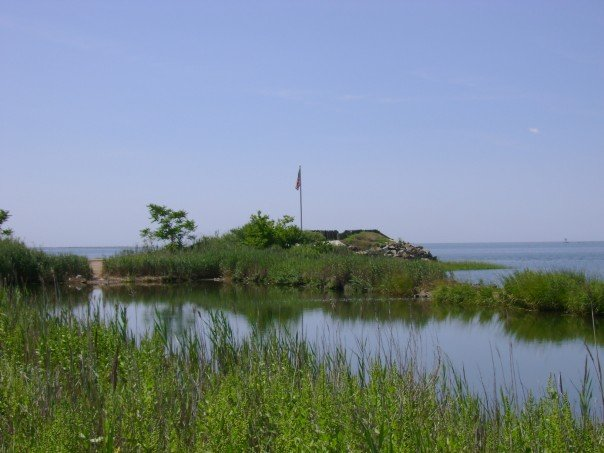
- The reconstructed Black Rock Fort at the Fort Nathan Hale historic site

- Location within Connecticut
- Location: Southern end of Woodward Avenue, New Haven, Connecticut
- Coordinates: 41°16′14″N 72°54′15″W
- Area: 3 acres (1.2 ha)
- Built: 1659, 1776
- NRHP reference No.: 70000711
- Added to NRHP: October 28, 1970

Fort Nathan Hale, also known as Fort Hale Park, Black Rock, is a 20-acre (8.1 ha) city park located on the east shore of New Haven Harbor in New Haven, Connecticut. It includes the site of a 1659 fort, a Revolutionary War-era fort, and a Civil War-era fort. The fort was named after Nathan Hale, Connecticut's official hero. Since 1921, the site has been owned by the state of Connecticut. It has been used as a park and maintained as a historical site by the City of New Haven. Educational programs are given throughout the year to students attending local schools.

The site was listed on the National Register of Historic Places in 1970. In 1970 the listing included three contributing buildings, one contributing site, and three contributing structures.

== History ==
In early 1776, the colony of Connecticut commissioned the construction of a fort on a point of rock that stretched out into the harbor to protect the port of New Haven from the British. This was the location of an earlier unnamed fort from circa 1657, and on this site was erected Black Rock Fort. Unfortunately for the colonists, in 1779 British General William Tryon, during his raid of Connecticut coastal communities, captured Black Rock Fort along with its nineteen defenders, but only after they had run out of ammunition. The British burned the barracks as they left. From 1807 to 1812, the abandoned fort was reconstructed with six guns as Fort Nathan Hale under the second system of US fortifications, and it served to defend the port from the British once again during the War of 1812. In 1863, Fort Nathan Hale II was built alongside the original fort, out of concern that Southern raiders might strike the city during the Civil War, but the fort saw no battle action. This fort contained deep, earthen, bomb-proof bunkers and mounted 18 guns. Unusually, the fort was partially demolished after the war. In the Spanish–American War of 1898, an "emergency" battery of six 10-inch Rodman guns was built, as the Spanish fleet potentially threatened the east coast.

== The fort as a historical recreation area ==
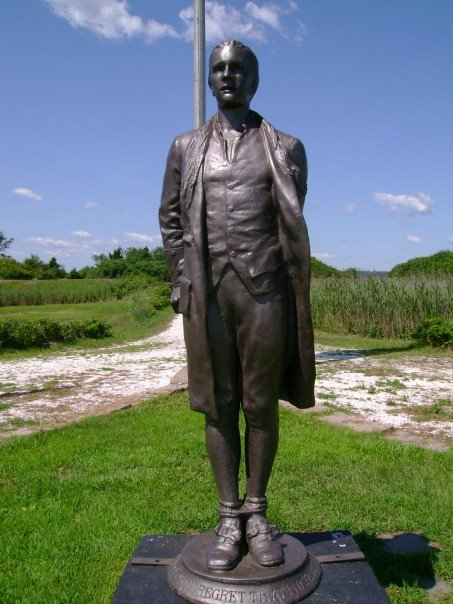
Nathan Hale statue by Bela Lyon Pratt at Fort Nathan Hale.

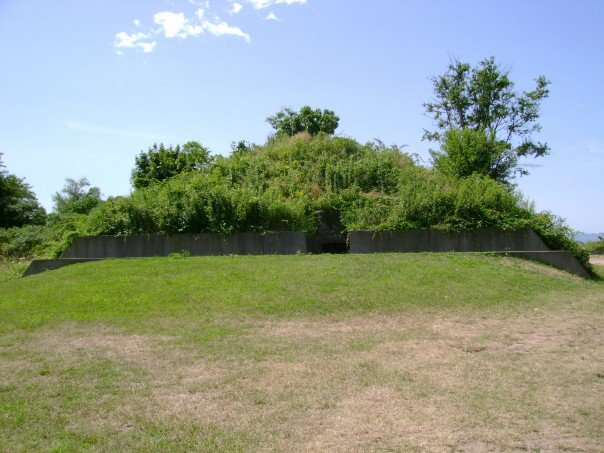
Powder Magazine

The site has been known as a historic site since 1921, when Congress deeded the fort to the State, which turned it over to the city to maintain. The site was turned into a popular bathing and picnic area but pollution and the hurricane of 1938 brought such recreation to an end. The site, neglected, became overgrown and the fort fell into decay. In 1967, the Fort Nathan Hale Restoration Project was founded by a group of concerned citizens interested in the restoration and preservation of Fort Nathan Hale.

Brought back to life in time for the nation's bicentennial, Fort Nathan Hale was rededicated on July 5, 1976. Both Fort Nathan Hale and Black Rock Fort have been reconstructed and include a newly restored drawbridge, moat, ramparts, powder magazines and "bombproof" bunker. Through the efforts of FNHRP, funds are raised annually to maintain, staff and promote the facility.

In addition to the reconstructed forts, the site features a memorial flag court with replicas of flags flown during the Colonial Era, the American Revolution, War of 1812, the Civil War, and today. The court also features a copy of the Nathan Hale statue by Bela Lyon Pratt that was dedicated at Yale University in 1914 (another copy of the statue stands outside CIA headquarters in Virginia). The statue depicts a young Hale, hands bound behind his back, just before being executed by British forces for espionage.

Each year over 7,000 visitors from countries around the world tour the historic site.

== See also ==
- National Register of Historic Places listings in New Haven, Connecticut
