= Charles Atwater =

American politician (1815–1891)

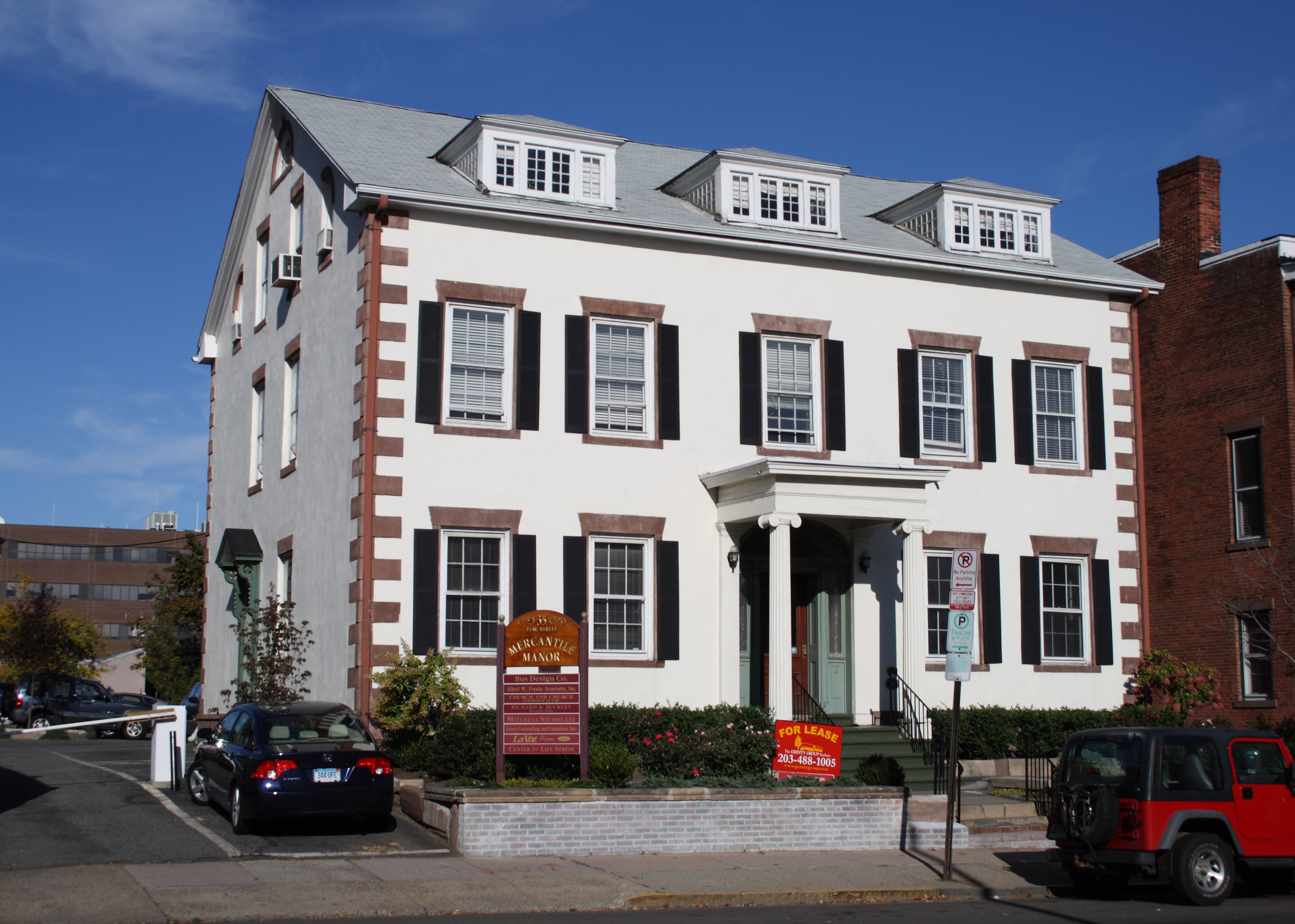
John Cook House, residence of Senator Atwater in 1858

Charles Atwater (January 2, 1815 – December 6, 1891) was an American Senator from Connecticut, graduated from Yale College. His son-in-law, Mathias Denman, became a cofounder of Cincinnati, Ohio. He was also a candidate for the office of Governor of Connecticut under the Democrats.

== Personal life ==
Atwater, second son of Charles and Lucy C. (Root) Atwater, was born in New Haven, Connecticut, on January 2, 1815. His father was President of the Iron and Steel Works, a banker, and a West India merchant. He graduated from Yale College in 1834.

After graduation, he spent a year in the Princeton Theological Seminary, but in 1835 he became a member of a firm of wholesale grocers in Philadelphia, where he married Mary, daughter of Joseph Montgomery, on Sept. 26, 1836. In 1840 he returned to New Haven, where the rest of his life was spent.

He was for many years extensively engaged in the wholesale iron and hardware business, and was prominent in many public interests in New Haven. In 1861 he was a representative in the Connecticut Legislature, and in 1862 a member of the Connecticut Senate. His interest in the Birmingham Iron and Steel Works led him to be an active promoter of the New Haven and Derby Railroad, of which he was long the Treasurer.

In 1872 he was the Democratic candidate for Lieutenant-Governor, and in two later years was nominated by the Greenback party for the office of Governor.

He died in New Haven from Bright's disease, after about a week's illness, on December 6, 1891, in his 77th year. He lived at John Cook House, a property he acquired in 1858 in New Haven, Connecticut.

== Children ==
His wife died on July 5, 1855, and on October 15, 1856, he married her sister, Emily Montgomery, who died in October, 1885. Six children survived him—a son and two daughters by the first marriage, and two daughters and a son by the second. The youngest daughter was married to David Daggett and the younger son graduated Yale's Sheffield Scientific School in 1879.

His daughter Sarah Atwater Denman became a philanthropist and close friend of Ralph Waldo Emerson. Her family, the Denmans, eventually achieved wealth in real estate, with an estate worth about $100,000 in 1870 records. The couple had met in 1825 at a gala in honor of the Marquis de la Fayette, a Major General of George Washington and member of the House of La Fayette. Mr. Denman of the Denman family was of royal descent through King James II of England, and Mrs. Atwater was from the Yale family who had helped found Yale College. Mathias Denman was a cofounder with Colonel Robert Patterson of Cincinnati, Ohio.

Sarah gave money to establish the Sarah Denman Hospital, now known as Blessing Hospital in Quincy, Illinois, and to various projects such as the Quincy Free Public Library, Sarah Atwater Denman Elementary School, and others.
