= Dwight Street Historic District =

Neighborhood in New Haven, Connecticut

- U.S. National Register of Historic Places
- U.S. Historic district
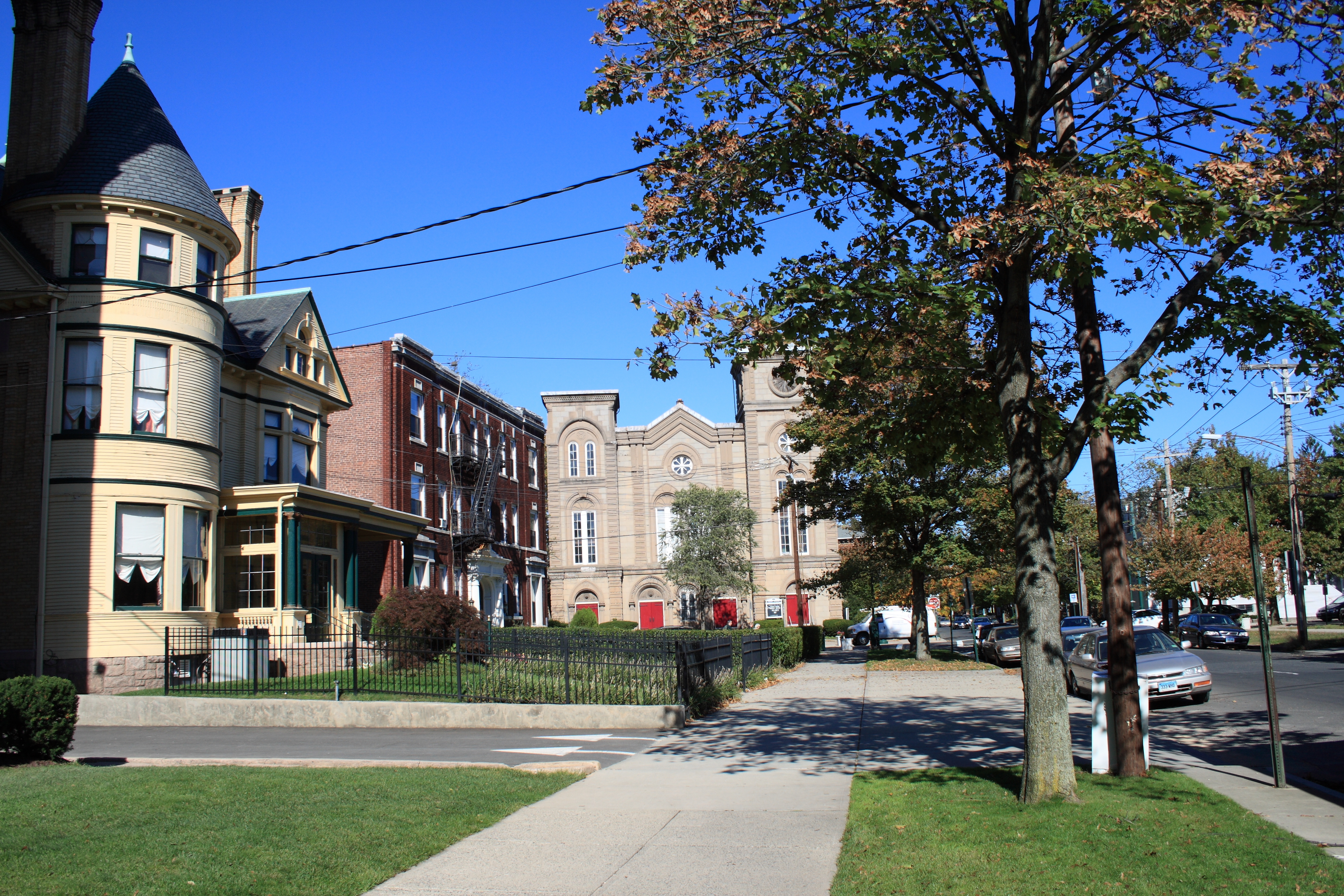

- Location within Connecticut Location within the United States
- Location: Roughly bounded by Park, North Frontage, Scranton, Sherman, and Elm Streets New Haven, Connecticut
- Coordinates: 41°18′38″N 72°56′23″W
- Area: 135 acres (55 ha)
- Built: 1812
- Architect: Multiple
- Architectural style: Mixed (more than 2 styles from different periods)
- NRHP reference No.: 83001281
- Added to NRHP: September 8, 1983

The Dwight Street Historic District is an irregularly shaped 135-acre (55 ha) historic district in New Haven, Connecticut. The district is located immediately West of the Center of Downtown New Haven and is generally bounded by Elm Street on the North, Park Street on the east, North Frontage Road on the south, and Sherman Avenue on the West. It contains one of the city's highest concentrations of well-preserved 19th and early 20th-century residential architecture, much of which was developed for the working classes in the city's factories. It was listed on the National Register of Historic Places in 1983. The historic district includes most of the Dwight neighborhood and several blocks of the northeast corner of the West River Neighborhood.

== Description and history ==
The area that is now the Dwight neighborhood was mainly farmland until after the War of 1812. Beginning in 1825, the construction of the Farmington Canal drew many laborers to the city, and the Dwight area, located just west of downtown New Haven, began its transformation into a densely built urban area with a grid of streets. In the 1830s, several carriage factories were located in the area to capitalize on the available labor, contributing to the development of that industry as a major economic force in the city's 19th-century development. Today, only a few buildings survive from the carriage industry in the neighborhood.

The district is about 135 acres (55 ha) in size. Of 629 buildings in the district 595 were deemed contributing buildings when it was listed on the National Register. Although there is a broad diversity of residential architecture, from modest Federal period single-family houses to early 20th-century apartment buildings, the district has an unusually high concentration of late 19th-century Victorian-era residences, typically in vernacular renditions of the then-popular Italianate, Second Empire, and Queen Anne styles.

Significant contributing buildings in the district include:

- Dwight Place Congregational Church, 1267 Chapel Street, (photo 3)
- Frederick P. Newton House, 128 Dwight Street (photo 17)
- Richmond Building, 246 Park Street (photo 18)
- Malthusheck Piano Manufacturing Building, 216-220 Park Street (photo 20)
- Troup School, Beers Street (photo 21)
- Robert Moses birth home, 83 Dwight Street

== See also ==
- National Register of Historic Places listings in New Haven, Connecticut
