= Raynham (New Haven, Connecticut) =

Historic house in Connecticut, United States

- U.S. National Register of Historic Places
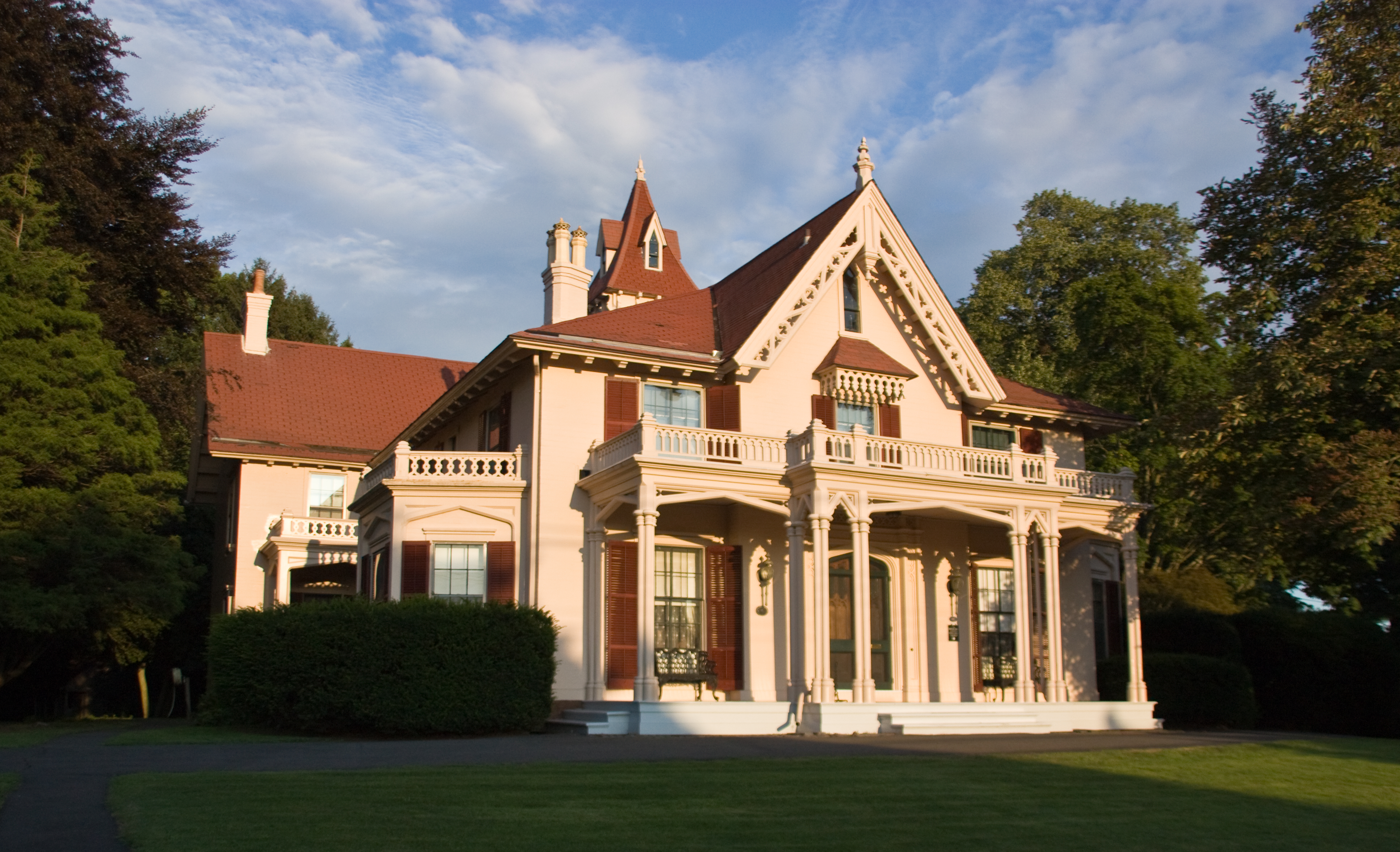

- Location within Connecticut Location within the United States
- Location: 709 Townsend Avenue, New Haven, Connecticut
- Coordinates: 41°16′34″N 72°53′42″W
- Area: 15 acres (6.1 ha)
- Built: 1804; 1850s
- Architect: Banner, Peter; Et al.
- Architectural style: Gothic Revival, Federal
- NRHP reference No.: 80004062
- Added to NRHP: July 11, 1980

Raynham, also known as the Kneeland Townsend House, is a historic residential property at 709 Townsend Avenue in New Haven, Connecticut. It is one of Connecticut's best-preserved Gothic Revival estates, having remained in the Townshend family for seven generations, and has a history dating back to the founding of the New Haven Colony in the 1630s. The property was listed on the National Register of Historic Places in 1980.

== Description and history ==
Raynham is located in eastern New Haven's East Shore neighborhood, on the east side of Townsend Avenue opposite its junction with Raynham Avenue. Its 15-acre (6.1 ha) includes picturesque grounds. The main house was built in 1804 with Federal styling, but was extensively altered in the 1850s, giving it its Gothic Revival treatment. The estate includes a carriage house, caretaker's house, a variety of agricultural outbuildings, and three structures, including a gazebo, added in the 1920s.

Land for the estate was first given to members of the Tuttle family in 1640 by the leaders of the New Haven Colony. It was sold to Isaac and Kneeland Townsend, prominent local merchants, in 1797. Kneeland Townsend built the core of the main house in 1804, and several of the outbuildings date to his ownership as well. The estate was given a significant makeover in the 1850s, applying the design principals and some design patterns of Calvert Vaux, a major proponent of Carpenter Gothic architecture. The surviving parcels of the estate constitute New Haven's largest single residential landholding.

== See also ==
- National Register of Historic Places listings in New Haven, Connecticut
