= St. Luke's Episcopal Church (New Haven, Connecticut) =

Historic church in Connecticut, United States

- U.S. National Register of Historic Places
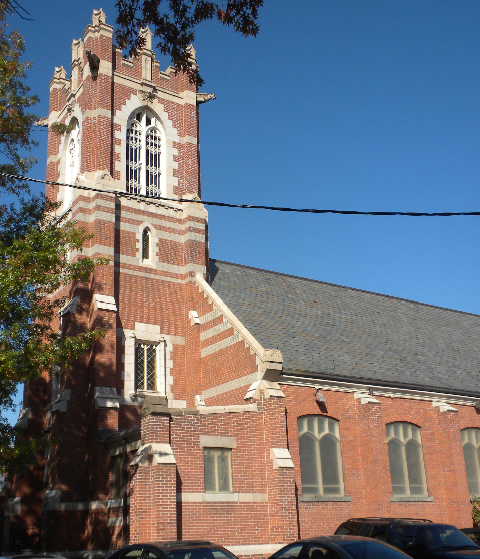

- Location within Connecticut Location within the United States
- Location: 111-113 Whalley Avenue, New Haven, Connecticut
- Coordinates: 41°18′51″N 72°56′9″W
- Area: 1 acre (0.40 ha)
- Architect: Brown & von Beren
- Architectural style: Late Gothic Revival
- NRHP reference No.: 03001170
- Added to NRHP: November 21, 2003

St. Luke's Episcopal Church is a historic church at 111-113 Whalley Avenue in New Haven, Connecticut. Built in 1905 for a congregation founded in 1844, it is a good example of late Gothic Revival architecture, and is further notable as the second church in the city established as an African-American congregation. It was listed on the National Register of Historic Places in 2003.

The church reported 223 members in 2015 and 207 members in 2023. Plate and pledge income for the congregation in 2025 was $136,762 with average Sunday attendance (ASA) of 54.

== Architecture and history ==
St. Luke's Episcopal Church is located Northwest of the New Haven Green, at the corner of Whalley Avenue and Sperry Street in the city's Dixwell Neighborhood. It is a single-story masonry structure, built out of red bricks with Indiana sandstone trim. It is L-shaped in plan, with the main sanctuary oriented with its long axis perpendicular to Whalley Avenue, covered by a gabled roof. The sides are buttressed, as is the tower that projects at the center of the front facade. A hyphen connects the sanctuary to a 20th-century addition fronting Sperry Avenue to the rear right side. The main entrance is at the center of the tower, set in a round-arch opening, above which is a small ornately surrounded stained glass window.

The congregation of St. Luke's has its origin in one established in 1844, when the African-American membership of the city's Trinity Church on the Green separated to organize it. At first they met in a chapel owned by Trinity, and then they purchased the building of an African-American Baptist congregation in 1852. They began a building drive in 1894 to raise funds for construction of this building, which was completed in 1905. It was designed by the local firm of Brown & von Beren, who did extensive work in the city in the early decades of the 20th century; it is one of a small number of churches designed by that firm.

== Gallery ==
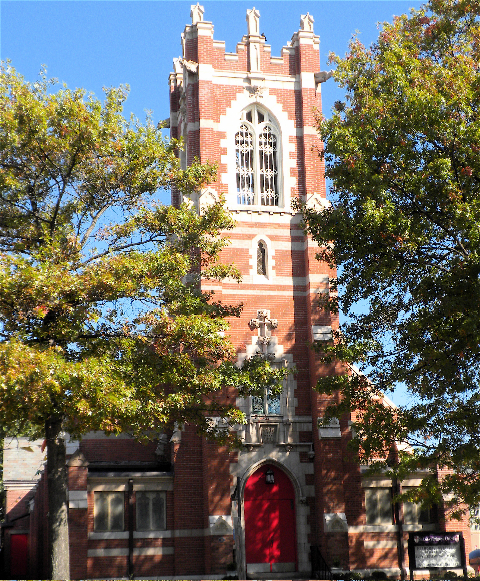

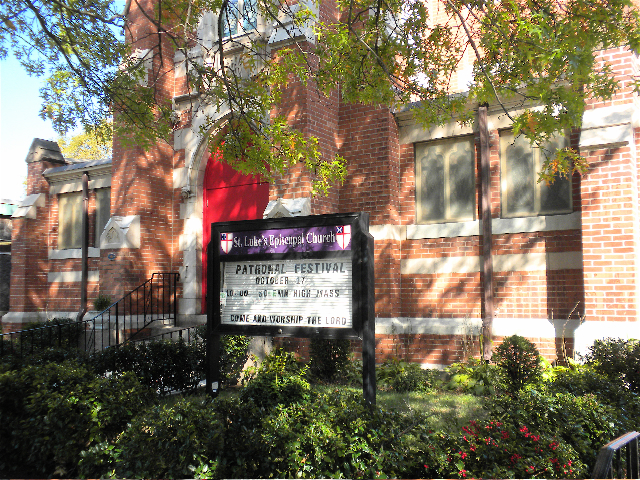

== See also ==
- National Register of Historic Places in New Haven, Connecticut
