= Edgewood Park Historic District =

Neighborhood in New Haven, Connecticut

- Edgewood Historic District
- U.S. National Register of Historic Places
- U.S. Historic district
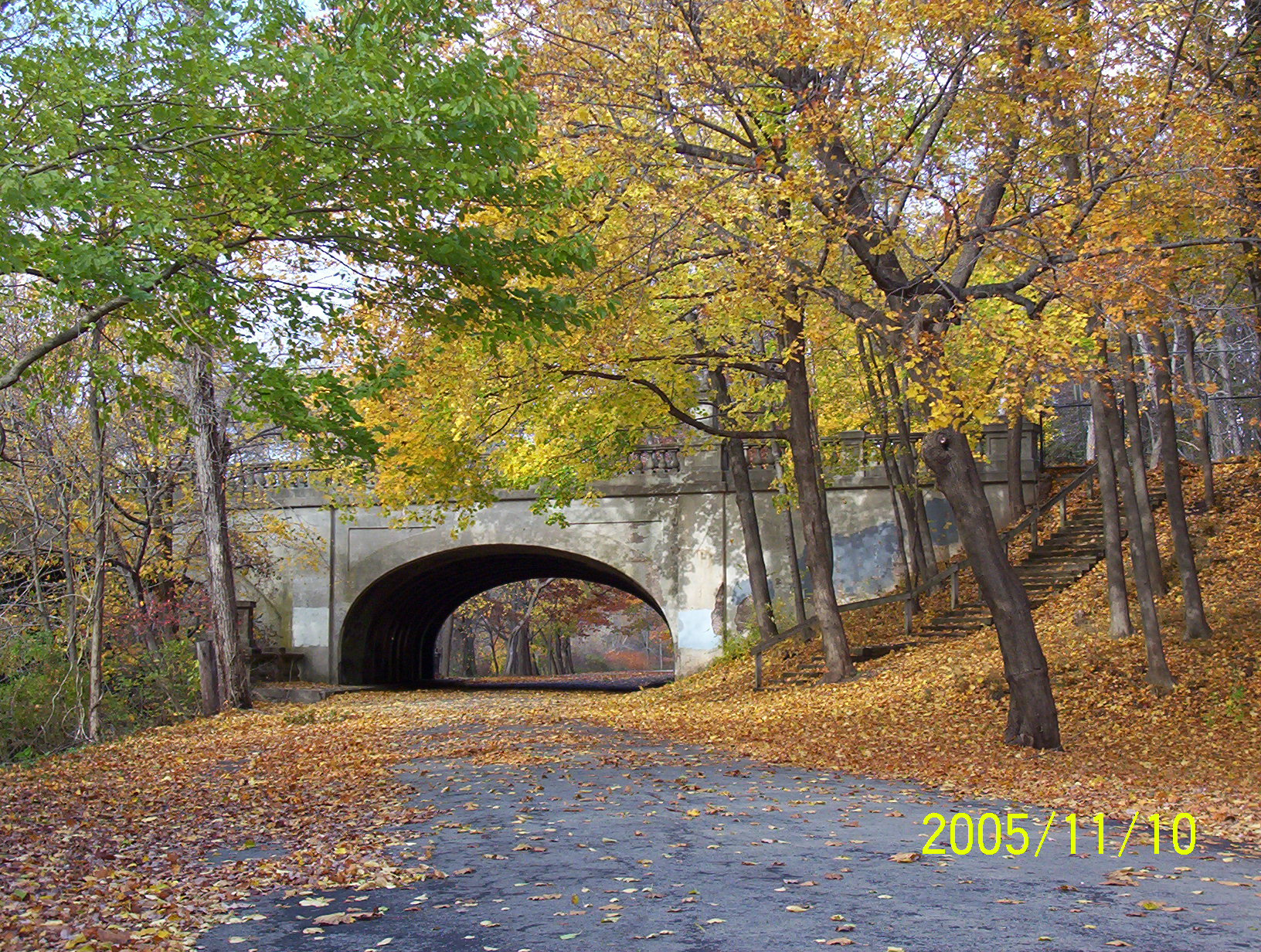
- Edgewood Avenue Bridge in Edgewood Park

- Location within Connecticut Location within the United States
- Location: Roughly bounded by Whalley Avenue and Elm Street, Sherman Avenue and Boulevard, Edgewood and Derby, and Yale Avenues, New Haven, Connecticut
- Coordinates: 41°18′55″N 72°57′16″W
- Area: 240 acres (97 ha)
- Architect: Mitchell, Donald Grant; Et al.
- Architectural style: Colonial Revival, Queen Anne
- NRHP reference No.: 86001991
- Added to NRHP: September 9, 1986

Edgewood Historic District is a historic district located in the west-central portion of New Haven, Connecticut. It was listed on the National Register of Historic Places in 1986. A predominantly residential area roughly bisected by Edgewood Avenue, a broad boulevard which features a large central esplanade and forms the principal east-west artery through the heart of the district. The area includes 232 contributing buildings, 4 other contributing structures, and 1 contributing object. Most of these were built between about 1888 and 1900, and represent the city's first neighborhood planned under the tenets of the City Beautiful movement. They are generally either Queen Anne or Colonial Revival in style, and are set (especially on the boulevard-like Edgewood Avenue) on larger lots.

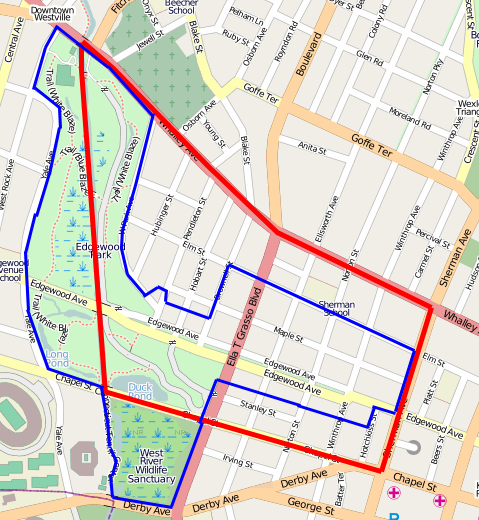
Map showing the official Edgewood neighborhood planning area in red and the Edgewood Historic District in blue.

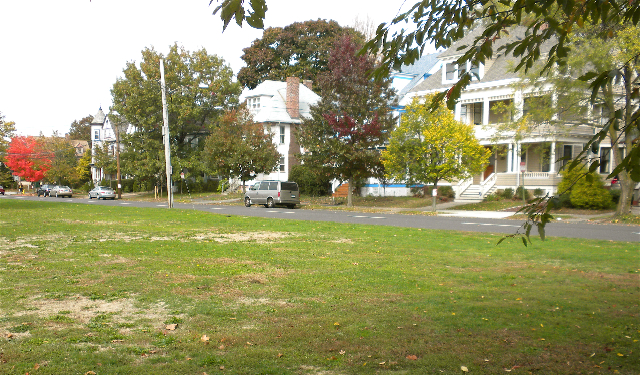
Edgewood Avenue widened near Edgewood Park.

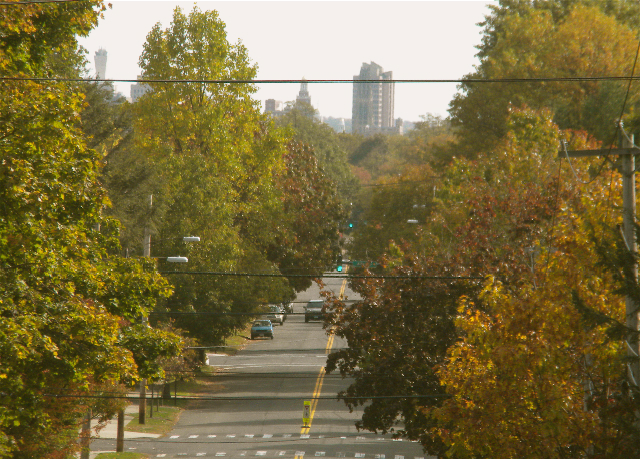
Edgewood Avenue descending to downtown New Haven.

The district's most notable topographical feature is the West River, which runs through Edgewood Park in the eastern end of the district on a north-south axis. From the West River, the landscape rapidly rises about forty feet to Yale Avenue on the west. Edgewood Park also includes memorials for the Spanish–American War and the Holocaust. The park's current layout was designed in 1910 by Frederick Law Olmsted Jr. The district includes the central portion of the Edgewood neighborhood, which is generally the area bounded by Whalley Avenue, Sherman Avenue, Chapel Street, and Edgewood Park. The district also borders the Dwight Street Historic District on the east.

Edgewood Avenue and is served by route 246 of Connecticut Transit New Haven. The main north-south road is Ella Grasso Boulevard (Route 10).

== See also ==
- National Register of Historic Places listings in New Haven, Connecticut
