= Dixwell, New Haven =

Neighborhood in New Haven, Connecticut

Coordinates: 41.32°N 72.93°W

Dixwell is a neighborhood of New Haven, Connecticut. Named for Dixwell Avenue, the main thoroughfare of the neighborhood which in turn was named for regicide judge John Dixwell, it is situated generally northwest of and adjacent to Downtown New Haven.

The northern part of the official Dixwell neighborhood planning area is included within the Winchester Repeating Arms Company Historic District. This historic neighborhood also includes important and pioneering African American institutions, including the Dixwell Avenue Congregational United Church of Christ, St. Luke's Episcopal Church, and the former Goffe Street Special School for Colored Children. The historic New Haven Armory is also in this neighborhood.

Over the years, Yale University has expanded into Dixwell and the neighborhood contains Yale buildings including Morse College, Ezra Stiles College, Benjamin Franklin College, Pauli Murray College, Payne Whitney Gymnasium and Ingalls Rink. The Yale Police Department relocated its headquarters to the neighborhood in 2005.

Toad's Place concert venue and nightclub is located in Dixwell. The Farmington Canal runs through the neighborhood as well.

In 2020, the Dixwell community opened a skatepark in Scantlebury park.
