= New Haven Harbor =

Port in Connecticut, United States

Coordinates: 41°16′45″N 72°55′0″W

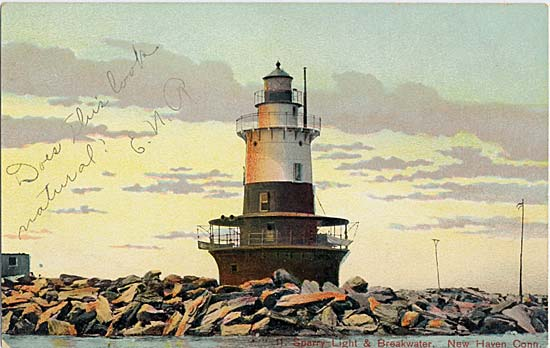
Sperry Breakwater Lighthouse as seen in a 1901-1907 era postcard. The light was built in 1899, torn down in 1933, and replaced by a skeleton tower.

New Haven Harbor is an inlet on the north side of Long Island Sound in the U.S. state of Connecticut. Centered on the city of New Haven, the state's third largest, it was carved by the retreat of the glaciers during the last ice age approximately 13,000 years ago.

The New Haven neighborhoods of City Point, Long Wharf, The Annex, and East Shore lie on the northern and eastern sides, with the city of West Haven on the west. The Quinnipiac and Mill rivers converge and empty into the inlet on its north end, and the West River joins at the west (also known as West Haven Harbor).

A peninsula, once known as "Little Necke" but since as Lighthouse Point after the light constructed on its tip in 1805, protects the harbor from the west. The original lighthouse was replaced in 1845 by the current Five Mile Point structure. It was replaced for navigation in 1877 by the offshore Southwest Ledge Light. Sperry Lighthouse (1899–1933) also served the harbor.

In July 1779, during the American Revolutionary War, the peninsula was the scene of an amphibious landing by British troops.

The harbor is crossed by Interstate 95 via the Pearl Harbor Memorial Bridge at the confluence of the Quinnipiac and mill rivers. It also can be traversed via the partially completed "Harborside Greenway" bicycle and pedestrian trail, which is part of the East Coast Greenway system.
