= Prospect Hill, New Haven =

Neighborhood in New Haven, Connecticut

Coordinates: 41.326°N 72.921°W

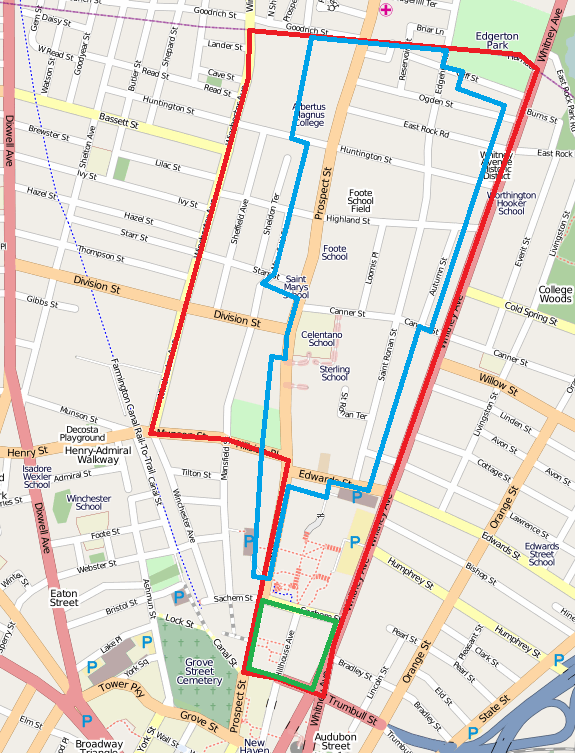
Map of Prospect Hill neighborhood. Red line is the city-defined neighborhood planning zone. Blue is the Prospect Hill Historic District. Green is the Hillhouse Avenue Historic District

Prospect Hill is a neighborhood of the city of New Haven, Connecticut located in the north central portion of the city, directly north of Downtown New Haven. The neighborhood contains residences, institutional buildings of Albertus Magnus College and a portion of the main campus of Yale University, including the Science Hill area, the Hillhouse Avenue area and the Yale Peabody Museum. The City of New Haven defines the neighborhood to be the region bounded by the town of Hamden in the north, Winchester Avenue in the west, Munson Street/Hillside Place/Prospect Street in the southwest, Trumbull Street in the south, and Whitney Avenue in the east. Prospect Street is the main thoroughfare through the neighborhood.

== Historic district ==
The Prospect Hill Historic District is a 185-acre (75 ha) historic district that is significant primarily for its architecture. It encompasses most of the residential portion of the Prospect Hill neighborhood. The historic district includes major collections of Queen Anne style architecture in the United States, Shingle Style architecture, Colonial Revival architecture, and Tudor Revival architecture. Numerous other styles are also represented. Some of the more significant properties which are included in the neighborhood are:

- The John M. Davies House, an 1868 mansion designed by Henry Austin, now known as Betts House and home to Yale University's international initiatives.
- The Othniel C. Marsh House, home of prominent 19th-century paleontologist (designated a National Historic Landmark), an earliest building of the Yale School of Forestry & Environmental Studies
- Connecticut Agricultural Experiment Station, 123 Huntington Street, home of the first agricultural experiment station in Connecticut (also designated as a National Historic Landmark)
- Silk House, Colonial Revival, c. 1915, at 75 Autumn Street, designed by architects Brown & von Beren
- Celentano Public School, 370 Canner Street, Victoria, originally built as Yale's first observatory
- 237 East Rock Road, Colonial Revival with Federal details, c. 1910, former home of Yale University president A. Whitney Griswold

=== Other historic districts ===
In addition to the main Prospect Hill Historic District, the neighborhood planning zone includes the Hillhouse Avenue Historic District, an area adjoining Downtown New Haven south of Science Hill, and part of Edgerton Park. Because the neighborhood planning zone eastern boundary runs along Whitney Avenue, a row of houses on the west side of the Whitney Avenue Historic District of East Rock is technically also within the neighborhood planning zone.

== Demographics ==
The residential part of the neighborhood roughly corresponds to census tract 1418.. Census tract 1418 excludes the portion officially within Yale University. As of the 2000 census, the total population of census track 1418 was 4,052. Of the population, 43.02% identified as White, 32.33% as Black, 0.20% as Native American, 19.55% as Asian, 0.10% as Pacific Islander, 2.07% as some other race, and 2.74% as two or more races. Of the total population of any race, 4.94% identified as being Hispanic or Latino, while 11.77% identified as being of Chinese ethnicity.
