= Neighborhoods of New Haven, Connecticut =

Neighbourhoods in Connecticut

The city of New Haven, Connecticut has many distinct neighborhoods. In addition to Downtown, centered on the central business district and the Green, are the following neighborhoods: the west central neighborhoods of Dixwell and Dwight; the southern neighborhoods of The Hill, historic water-front City Point (or Oyster Point), and the harborside district of Long Wharf; the western neighborhoods of Edgewood, West River, Westville, Amity, and West Rock; East Rock, Cedar Hill, Prospect Hill, and Newhallville in the northern side of town; the east central neighborhoods of Mill River and Wooster Square, an Italian-American neighborhood; Fair Haven, an immigrant community located between the Mill and Quinnipiac rivers; Quinnipiac Meadows and Fair Haven Heights across the Quinnipiac River; and facing the eastern side of the harbor, The Annex and East Shore (or Morris Cove).

== List of neighborhoods ==
New Haven is made up of approximately 40 distinct neighborhoods, each listed below.

- Amity
- Annex
- Audubon Arts District
- Beaver Hills
- Beverly Hills
- Bishop Woods
- Broadway District
- Brookside
- Cedar Hill
- Chatham Square (Another name for the Northeast section of the Fair Haven neighborhood)
- Church Street South
- City Point/Oyster Point
- Dixwell
- Downtown New Haven(Central Business District)
- Dwight
- East Rock
- East Shore/Morris Cove
- Edgewood
- Fair Haven
- Fair Haven Heights
- Hill
- Jocelyn Square
- Kimberly Square
- Long Wharf
- Mill River
- Newhallville
- New Haven Green (within the Downtown neighborhood)
- Prospect Hill
- Quinnipiac Meadows
- Quinnipiac River Village
- Trowbridge Square
- Upper State Street
- Westville
- West Chapel District
- West Hills
- West River
- West Rock
- Whalley District
- Wooster Square
- Yale Main Campus
- Yale Medical Campus

== Historic districts ==
Numerous areas within the city are listed on the National Register of Historic Places or by the state of Connecticut as historic districts:

- Beaver Hills Historic District
- Chapel Street Historic District
- Dwight Street Historic District
- Edgewood Park Historic District
- Elm Street Historic District
- Fairlawn-Nettleton Historic District
- Hillhouse Avenue Historic District
- Howard Avenue Historic District
- New Haven Green Historic District
- Ninth Square Historic District
- Orange Street Historic District
- Oyster Point Historic District
- Prospect Hill Historic District
- Quinnipiac River Historic District
- Redfield & West Streets Historic District
- River Street Historic District
- Trowbridge Square Historic District
- Upper State Street Historic District
- Westville Village Historic District
- Whitney Avenue Historic District
- Winchester Repeating Arms Company Historic District
- Wooster Square Historic District
