= PROUD Academy (Connecticut) =

LGBTQ+ middle and secondary school in Connecticut

PROUD Academy, Inc
- New Haven, Connecticut; United States

Information
- Established: June 28, 2021
- Grades: 7-12
- Website: PROUD Academy

PROUD Academy Inc, is a nonprofit incorporated on June 28, 2021. The goal is to open and operate a school geared for LGBTQ+ students and their allies in Connecticut. The nonprofit is pursuing a charter school initiative and will apply for charter school status in CT. The name "PROUD" Academy stands for "Proudly Respecting Our Unique Differences" Academy.

The academy will focus on being a safe space free of harassment and bullying for individuals who may have traditionally faced discrimination and harassment. The school will support a broadly inclusive student body bringing together students of different sexual orientations, gender identities/expressions, origins, and faiths.

In 2023, it announced that it was changing locations from New Haven to Ansonia citing high costs and a lack of funding. The school aims to enroll at least 20 students and has received strong interest from families and teachers. Supporters say it will provide a safe, inclusive space for students to thrive.

In 2025, it received approval from the Connecticut State Board of Education to operate as a charter school. It is scheduled to open in September 2026.

== See also ==
- Betsy Ross Arts Magnet School
- ACES Educational Center for the Arts
