= Education in Connecticut =

Education in Connecticut covers the public and private schools of all levels from colonial era to the present. Originally an offshoot of Massachusetts, colonial Connecticut was committed to Puritanism's high regard for education. Yale College became a national model for higher education. Immigration in the 19th century brought a large working class Catholic element that supported vocational training, as well as a distinctive parochial educational system. The southwestern districts include wealthy suburbs of New York City that use strong public schools to compete for residents.

== History ==
Hartford Public High School (1638) is the third-oldest secondary school in the nation after the Collegiate School (1628) in Manhattan and the Boston Latin School (1635).

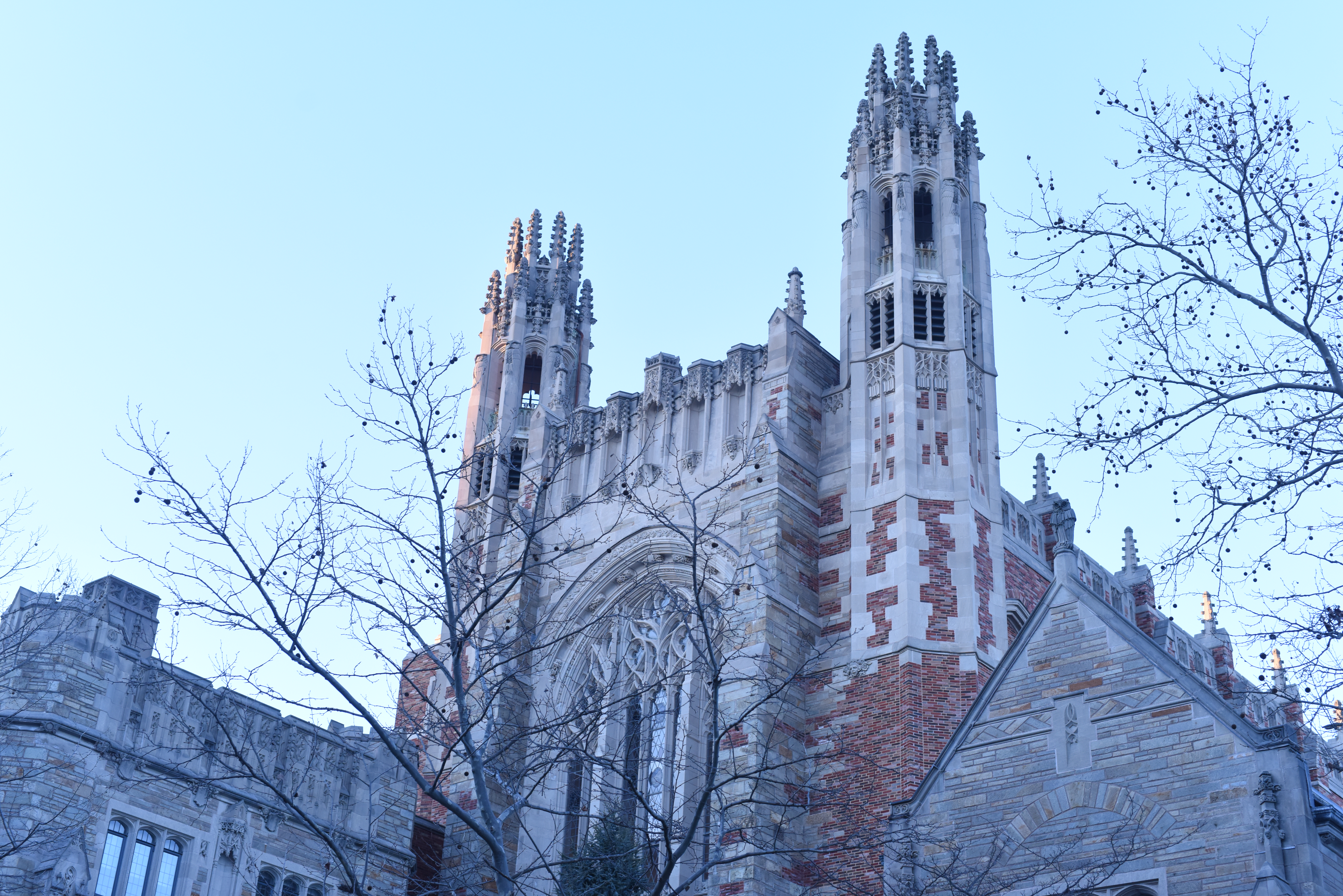
Yale's Latin motto means "light and truth."

Jackson Turner Main finds that teaching in colonial days was a poorly paid, part-time, temporary job. Young men typically moved on to more secure occupations as soon as possible. There was one great exception: Reverend Thomas Clap (1703–1767), president of Yale college, 1740–1766. At his death he left an estate worth £6,656, including 600 acres of land. His wealth came from marriage and his attention to lucrative investments.

Puritanism required a well educated ministry, and Harvard (founded 1636) and Yale (founded 1701) provided the men, Of the 2,466 graduates of the two schools from 1691 to 1760, 987 (40%) became ministers. However the salaries were low and increasingly ministers were unable to send their own sons to college.

=== 19th century ===
Henry Barnard (1811–1900) was a leading proponent of educational reform. In 1838 he led the state legislature with the passage of his bill. It provided for "the better supervision of the common schools", and established a board of "commissioners of common schools" in the state. He was the secretary of the board from 1838 until its abolition in 1842. He worked indefatigably to reorganize and reform the common school system of the state, thus earning a national reputation as an educational reformer. After taking a leading role in education in Rhode Island in the 1840s he returned to Connecticut. From 1851 to 1855, he was "superintendent of common schools", and principal of the Connecticut State Normal School at New Britain.

In 1832, Quaker schoolteacher Prudence Crandall created the first integrated schoolhouse in the United States by admitting Sarah Harris, the daughter of a free African-American farmer in the local community, to her Canterbury Female Boarding School in Canterbury. Many prominent townspeople objected and pressured to have Harris dismissed from the school, but Crandall refused. Families of the current students removed their daughters. Consequently, Crandall ceased teaching white girls altogether and opened up her school strictly to African American girls. In 1995, the Connecticut General Assembly designated Prudence Crandall as the state's official heroine.

=== 2012: Sandy Hook Elementary School shooting ===
On December 14, 2012, Adam Lanza shot and killed 26 people, including 20 children and 6 staff, at Sandy Hook Elementary School in the Sandy Hook village of Newtown, Connecticut, and then killed himself.

== Quality ==
Connecticut ranked third in the nation for educational performance, according to Education Week's Quality Counts 2018 report. It earned an overall score of 83.5 out of 100 points. On average, the country received a score of 75.2. Connecticut posted a B-plus in the Chance-for-Success category, ranking fourth on factors that contribute to a person's success both within and outside the K–12 education system. Connecticut received a mark of B-plus and finished fourth for School Finance. It ranked 12th with a grade of C on the K–12 Achievement Index.

== K–12 ==
=== Public schools ===
Today, the Connecticut State Board of Education manages the public school system for children in grades K–12. Board of Education members are appointed by the governor of Connecticut.

=== Private preparatory schools ===
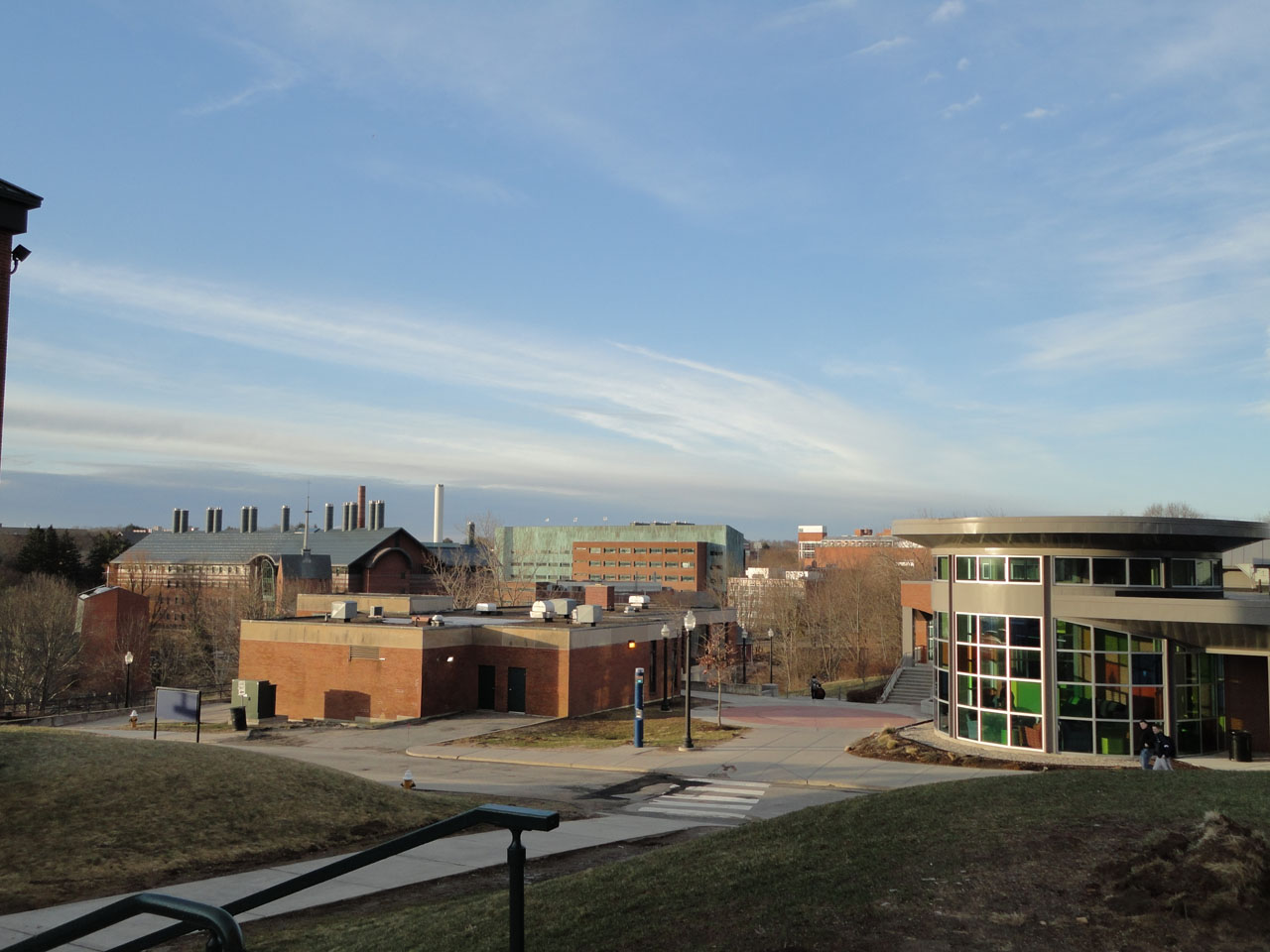
University of Connecticut, the state's main public university

Connecticut has a number of private schools. Private schools may file for approval by the state Department of Education, but are not required to. Per state law, private schools must file yearly attendance reports with the state.

Notable private schools include the Taft School, Choate Rosemary Hall, the Kent School, and Miss Porter's School.

== Colleges and universities ==
Connecticut was home to the nation's first law school, Litchfield Law School, which operated from 1773 to 1833 in Litchfield. Well known universities in the state include Yale University, Wesleyan University, Trinity College, Sacred Heart University, Fairfield University, Quinnipiac University, and the University of Connecticut. The Connecticut State University System includes 4 state universities, and the state also has 12 community colleges. The United States Coast Guard Academy is located in New London.

== See also ==
- PROUD Academy (Connecticut)
- Henry Barnard
- Thomas Clapp, President of Yale 1740–1766
- History of Connecticut
- History of education in the United States
- History of education in Massachusetts
