= The Hill, New Haven =

Neighborhood in New Haven, Connecticut

The Hill
- Neighborhood of New Haven
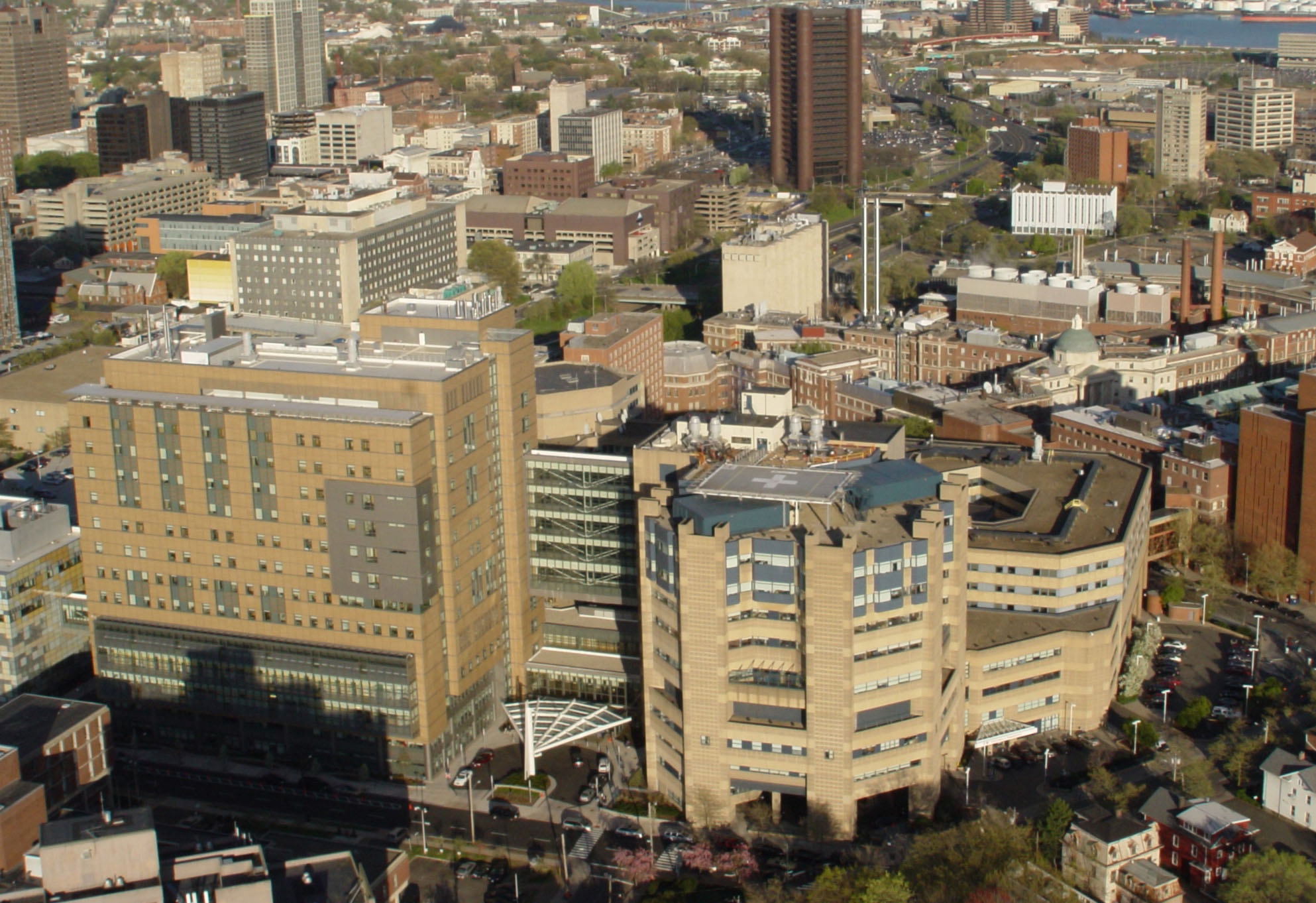
- Yale-New Haven Hospital

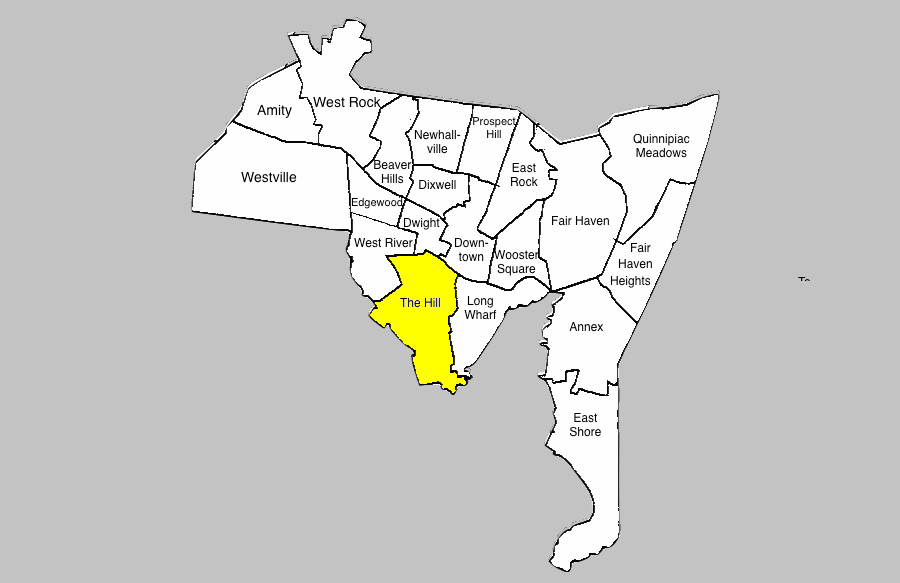
- location of The Hill within New Haven
- Coordinates: 41°17′46″N 72°56′13″W
- Country: United States
- State: Connecticut
- City: New Haven

The Hill is the southwesternmost neighborhood of New Haven, Connecticut. As early as 1800, this area was known as "Sodom Hill". Located directly south of Downtown New Haven, this neighborhood is home to residential areas, some light industry, New Haven Union Station as well as Yale-New Haven Hospital and the Yale School of Medicine.

== History ==
Originally a distinct suburb of New Haven, The Hill began its urban development in the early 1800s. The sub-neighborhood south of Columbus Avenue now known as Trowbridge Square was established in the 1830s by brothers Nathaniel and Simeon Jocelyn. Known at first as the village of Spireworth, this enclave was founded as a rare example of a racially integrated planned community.

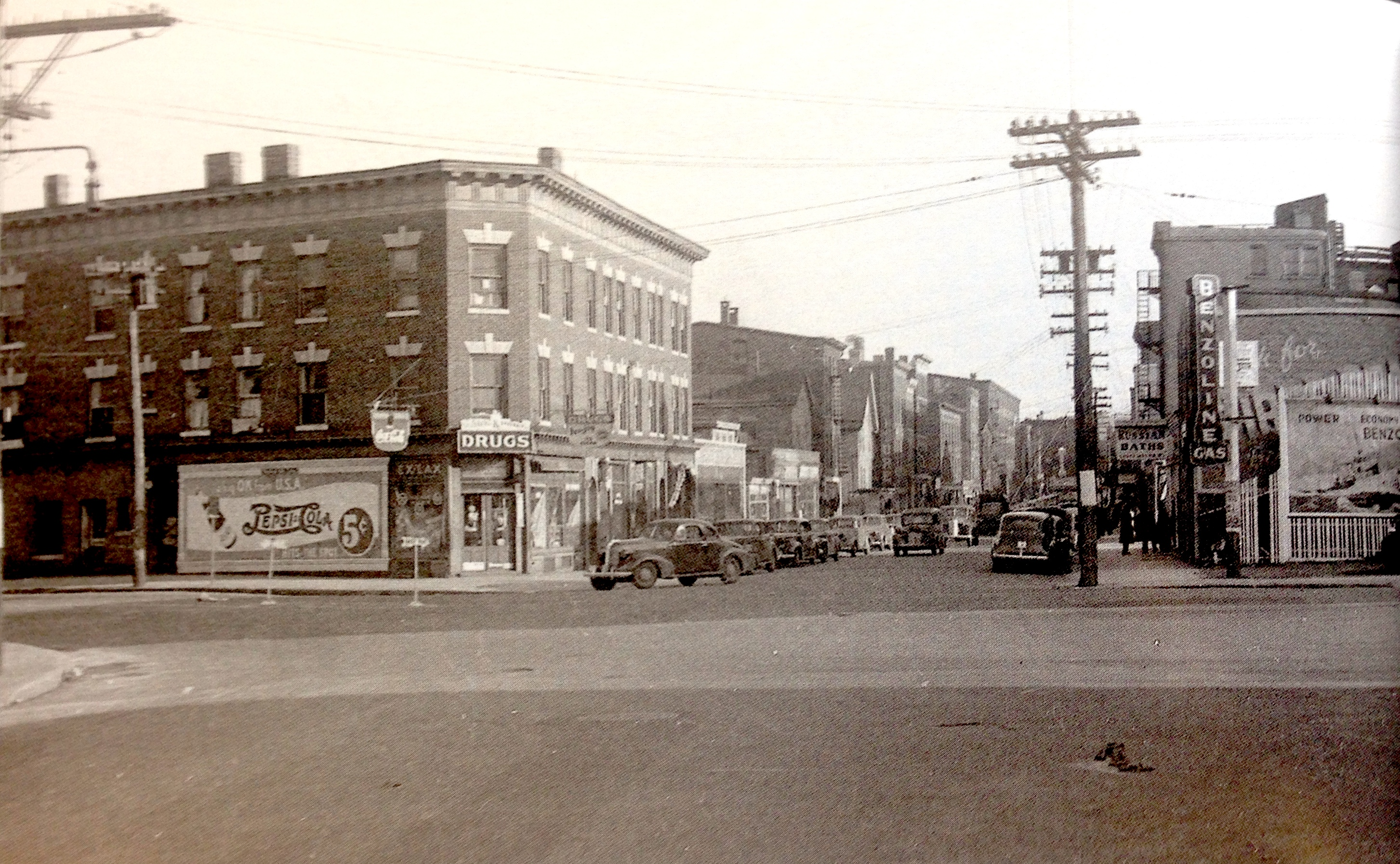
Oak Street, in a section of the Hill that was fully demolished to make way for the Oak Street Connector

In the middle of the century, waves of Irish and German immigrants began pouring into the neighborhood. African-Americans migrated from the American South, and this neighborhood also served as a stop on the Underground Railroad.

In 1957 a sizable swath of the Hill containing 881 households and 350 businesses was flattened to make way for the Oak Street Connector, a 1.1 mile highway stub that was never extended toward Derby as originally planned. In 2013, New Haven began work to downgrade the Oak Street Connector into city streets in an effort to reconnect The Hill to Downtown New Haven.

The neighborhood includes a number of historic structures, including the former Ahavas Sholem Synagogue, the New Haven Jewish Home for the Aged, and the former Welch Training School, all on the National Register of Historic Places.

== Geography ==
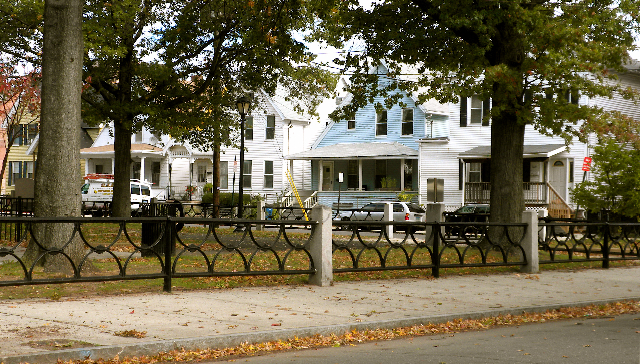
Houses along Trowbridge Square

The Hill is bounded by the Route 34/Oak Street Connector and Legion Avenue at the north, the Long Wharf neighborhood at the east, the city of West Haven at the west, and Long Island Sound at the south. The southeastern part of the neighborhood (south of Columbus Avenue) is roughly divided into three sections: Kimberly Square, Trowbridge Square, and City Point. This area south of Columbus Avenue originally was known as the Oyster Point Quarter, while the area north of Columbus Avenue was known as Sodom Hill. The Trowbridge Square section and the southern half of the City Point section are listed as historic districts on the National Register of Historic Places. City Point, which is located south of the railroad tracks, was traditionally a separate neighborhood but official neighborhood planning maps now include it in The Hill. The block formed by Redfield, West, Congress, and Columbus is also a state historic district known as Redfield & West Streets Historic District.

Columbus Avenue, Washington Avenue, and Howard Avenue are the three main arteries of the Hill. Between Washington Avenue and I-95, the area immediately fronting Howard Avenue has been designated as the Howard Avenue Historic District.

== Economy ==
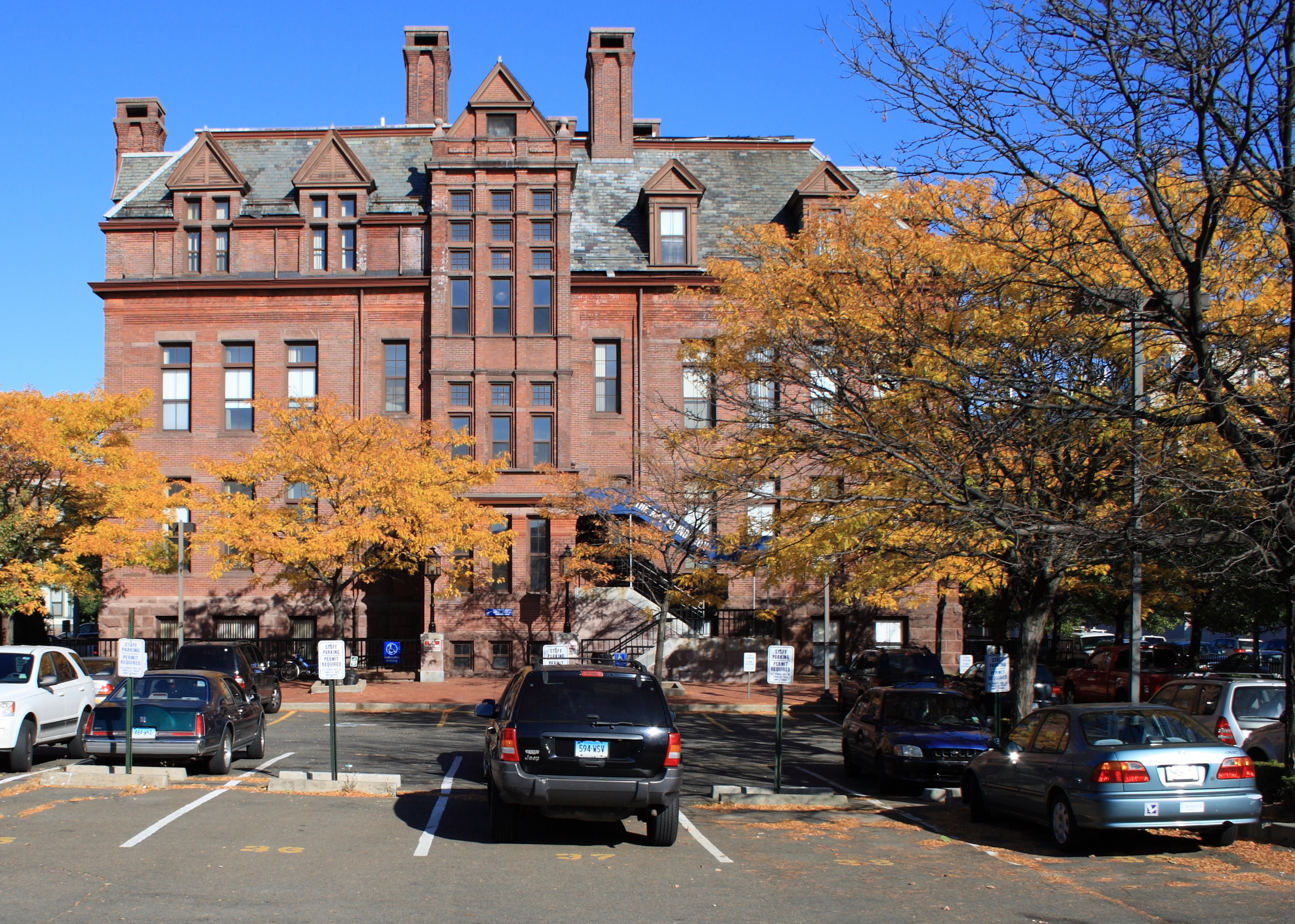
Welch Training School, on the National Register of Historic Places

The Hill neighborhood contains the majority of buildings of Yale-New Haven Hospital and Yale Medical School. The expansion of this Medical campus area is a source of tension with the bordering residential areas. The residential areas of the Hill are mostly working-class and minority neighborhoods.

The Hill is also home to New Haven's main railroad station, Union Station, and some light-industrial businesses such as the Lupi-Legna Bakery. Public schools and libraries include Hill Regional Career High School, Betsy Ross Arts Magnet School, Roberto Clemente Leadership Academy and the Wilson Library.

== Demographics ==
The ZIP code for the neighborhood is 06519. As of 2010, the population of this ZIP code was 16,428 with an ethnic makeup of 50.5% Hispanic or Latino, 9.8% non-Hispanic white, 36.9% non-Hispanic African American, 0.7% Native American, 1.2% Asian, 0.1% Pacific Islander, 0.1% non-Hispanic from some other race and 3.6% from two or more races.
