= Leoni W. Robinson =

American architect

Leoni Warren Robinson
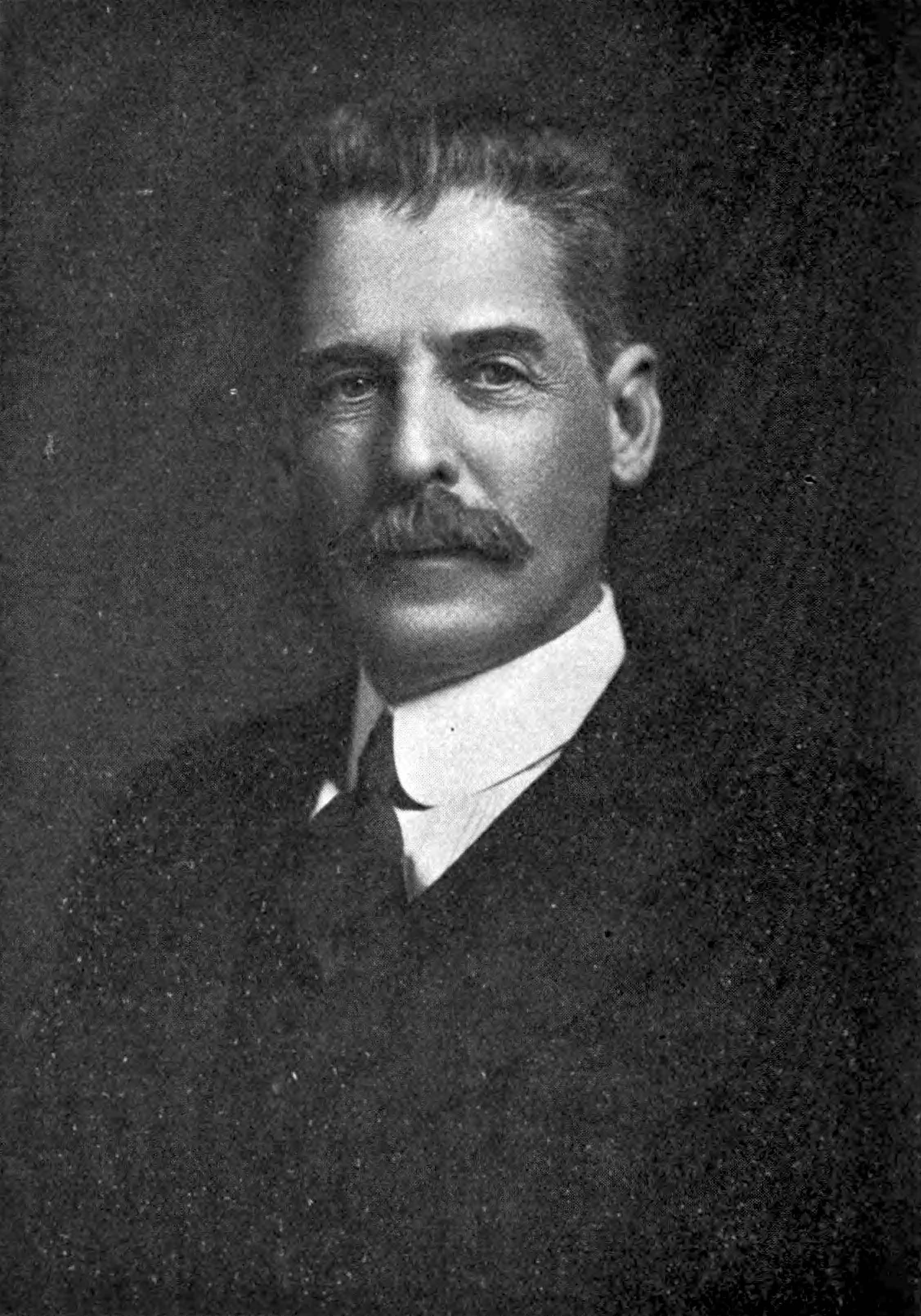
- Leoni W. Robinson, architect
- Born: September 26, 1851; New Haven, Connecticut
- Died: February 12, 1923 (aged 71); New Haven, Connecticut
- Occupation: Architect

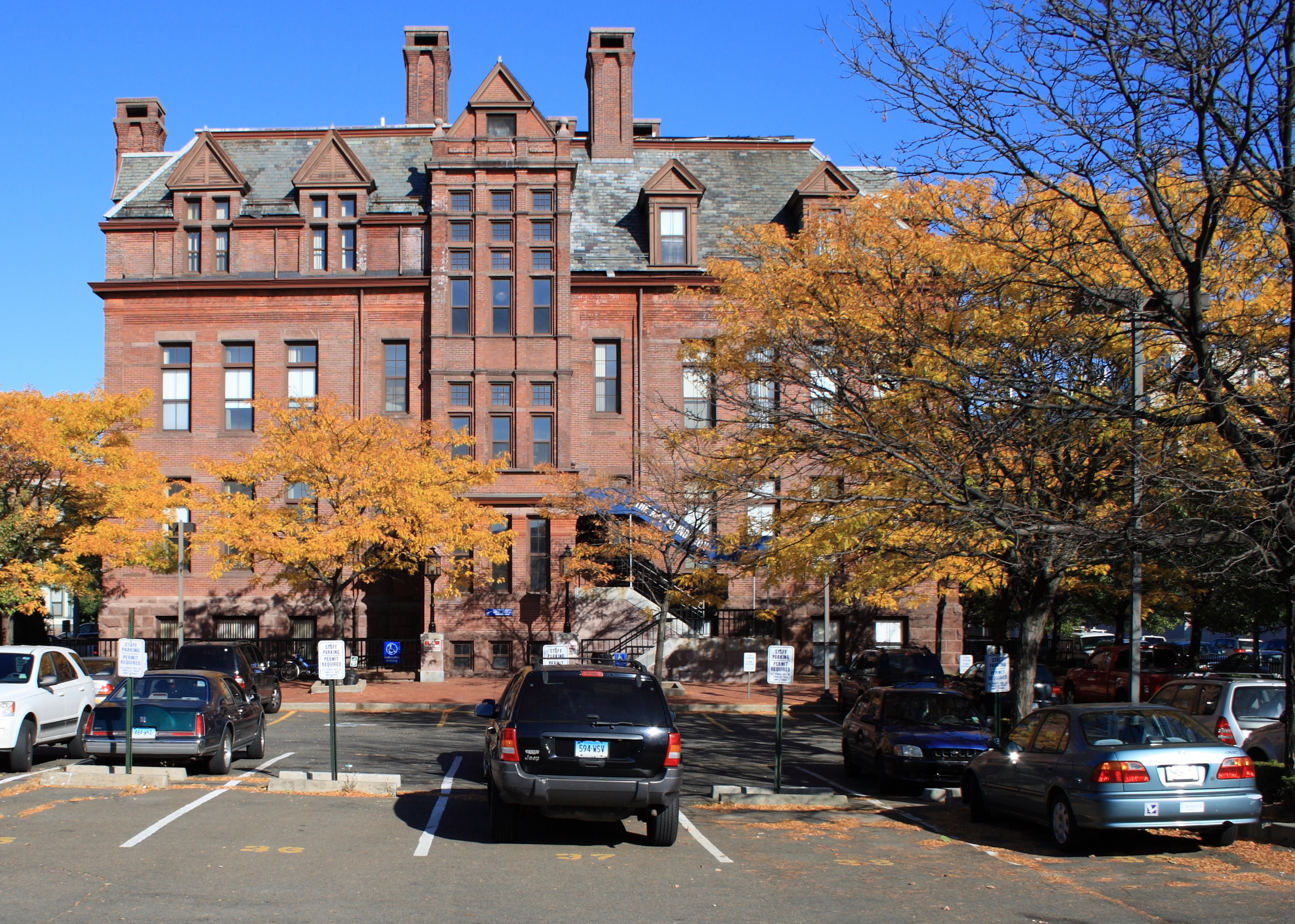
The Welch Training School in New Haven, Connecticut, designed by Leoni W. Robinson and built in 1883.

Leoni W. Robinson (1851-1923) was a leading architect in New Haven, Connecticut.

== Life and career ==
Leoni Warren Robinson was born September 26, 1851, in New Haven, Connecticut, to Warren Robinson, a builder, and Sarah Howard (Woodward) Robinson. He was one of eight children. The family lived in Ohio from 1854 to 1857 and in Janesville, Wisconsin, from 1857 to 1863 before returning to New Haven. He attended the local public schools and received preliminary architectural training in the office of Henry Austin. In 1870 he moved to New York City and joined the office of architect Robert G. Hatfield. In 1874, on Hatfield's recommendation, he joined the Office of the Supervising Architect in Washington, DC, where he worked on large Federal projects under Supervising Architects Alfred B. Mullett, William A. Potter and James G. Hill. In 1877 and 1878 he traveled in Europe, and when he returned to the United States he opened his own office as an architect in New Haven.

Robinson practiced continuously in New Haven until his death in 1923. Though he was best known for the design of schools, Robinson designed all types of buildings, including the First National Bank Building of 1895, New Haven's first skyscraper. By this time he was the leading architect in New Haven. From 1878 to 1894 he was architect to the Board of Education of New Haven, and from 1903 to 1913 was secretary of the commission charged with the construction of the Connecticut State Library and Supreme Court Building in Hartford, for which Donn Barber of New York City and Edward T. Hapgood of Hartford were chosen architects. After his death, his practice was succeeded by the firm of Gray & Lawrence, and later by George Herbert Gray alone. Gray & Lawrence were responsible for the Little Theatre of New Haven, built in 1924 and listed on the National Register of Historic Places in 1984.

In 1883 Robinson joined the American Institute of Architects, and became a Fellow in 1889. For a time he was president of the Connecticut chapter. Robinson was also affiliated with the Architectural League of New York and the Connecticut Society of Civil Engineers. For two years he was a member of the Board of Education of New Haven.

== Personal life ==
In 1883 Robinson married Mina J. de Moss of Coshocton, Ohio, and they had three daughters. The family lived at 220 Canner Street in New Haven, a house designed by and built for Robinson in 1894.

Robinson died February 12, 1923, at home in New Haven at the age of 71.

== Legacy ==
In 1917 Robinson was among the founders of the Architectural Club of New Haven, later the Connecticut Architectural League, and was its first president. After his death the organization created the Leoni W. Robinson Memorial Medal, similar in conception to the Harleston Parker Medal of Boston, to be awarded annually to Connecticut architects or firms for excellence in architecture. It was first awarded in 1925 and recipients were Leonard Asheim in 1925, Orr & del Grella in 1926, Theodate Pope Riddle in 1927, William F. Brooks, formerly of Davis & Brooks, in 1928 and Malmfeldt, Adams & Prentice in 1929. It is not known if the medal was awarded after 1929.

Robinson designed at least five buildings that are listed on the National Register of Historic Places, and others contribute to listed historic districts.

== Architectural works ==
- Welch Training School (former), 495 Congress St, New Haven, Connecticut (1883, NRHP 1983)
- Lovell School (former), 25 Lawrence St, New Haven, Connecticut (1884)
- Seymour High School and Annex (former), 100 Bank St, Seymour, Connecticut (1885 and 1905, NRHP 1983)
- Episcopal Church of the Ascension (former), (Note: A contributing property to the Howard Avenue Historic District, NRHP-listed in 1985.) 375 Howard Ave, New Haven, Connecticut (1887)
- Horace Day School (former), 91 Rosette St, New Haven, Connecticut (1888)
- Southern New England Telephone Company Building, 122 Court St, New Haven, Connecticut (1889, demolished)
- Union School, 174 Center St, West Haven, Connecticut (1890, NRHP 1987)
- House for Augustus H. Kimberly, (Note: A contributing property to the Whitney Avenue Historic District, NRHP-listed in 1989.) 271 Whitney Ave, New Haven, Connecticut (1891)
- Larue Building, (Note: A contributing property to the Main Street Historic District, NRHP-listed in 1983.) 240 Main St, Danbury, Connecticut (1891)
- Monson Building, 760 Chapel St, New Haven, Connecticut (1891)
- House for Joseph Porter, 215 Whitney Ave, New Haven, Connecticut (1893, demolished)
- House for Leoni W. Robinson, 220 Canner St, New Haven, Connecticut (1894)
- First National Bank Building, 42 Church St, New Haven, Connecticut (1895, demolished)
- Quinnipiac Brewery addition, 1 Brewery Sq, Fair Haven, New Haven, Connecticut (1896, NRHP 1983)
- Roger Sherman School (former), 765 Elm St, New Haven, Connecticut (1896)
- Adrian Hospital (former), (Note: For this project Robinson was commissioned by his brother, Lucius W. Robinson, president of the Rochester and Pittsburgh Coal and Iron Company of Indiana, Pennsylvania.) 1 Park Ave, Punxsutawney, Pennsylvania (1897)
- House for Oliver C. Andrews, 24 Edgehill Rd, New Haven, Connecticut (1899)
- Chapel, Evergreen Cemetery, 769 Ella T Grasso Blvd, New Haven, Connecticut (1902)
- Hope Memorial Building, Yale School of Medicine, New Haven, Connecticut (1902)
- First Baptist Church, (Note: Designed in association with Clarence H. Blackall of Boston.) 205 Edwards St, New Haven, Connecticut (1903)
- New Haven Water Company Building, (Note: A contributing property to the Ninth Square Historic District, NRHP-listed in 1984.) 100 Crown St, New Haven, Connecticut (1903)
- House for Thomas D. Goodell, (Note: A contributing property to the Prospect Hill Historic District, NRHP-listed in 1979.) 35 Edgehill Rd, New Haven, Connecticut (1904)
- House for Philip E. Browning, 23 Edgehill Rd, New Haven, Connecticut (1905)
- House for J. Arnold Norcross, 421 St Ronan St, New Haven, Connecticut (1905)
- Southern New England Telephone Company Building, (Note: A contributing property to the Downtown Norwich Historic District, NRHP-listed in 1985.) 31 West St, Norwich, Connecticut (1906–07, NRHP 1983)
- Trinity Church on the Green nave reconstruction, 230 Temple St, New Haven, Connecticut (1906)
- Buildings for the Winchester Repeating Arms Company, (Note: Contributing properties to the Winchester Repeating Arms Company Historic District, NRHP-listed in 1989.) 275 Winchester Ave, New Haven, Connecticut (1908 et seq.)
- Southern New England Telephone Company Building, 31 West St, Danbury, Connecticut (1908)
- Mechanics Bank Building, 72 Church St, New Haven, Connecticut (1910, demolished)
- Southern New England Telephone Company Building, (Note: Formerly a contributing property to the Ann Street Historic District, NRHP-listed in 1983.) 185 Pearl St, Hartford, Connecticut (1911, demolished)
- Optical Building, 849 Chapel St, New Haven, Connecticut (1912)
- House for Walter Crittendon, 396 Livingston St, New Haven, Connecticut (1914)
- New Haven Free Public Library Fair Haven Branch, 182 Grand Ave, Fair Haven, New Haven, Connecticut (1916)
- Southern New England Telephone Company Building Addition, 126 Court St, New Haven, Connecticut (1916, altered 1929)

== Gallery of architectural works ==
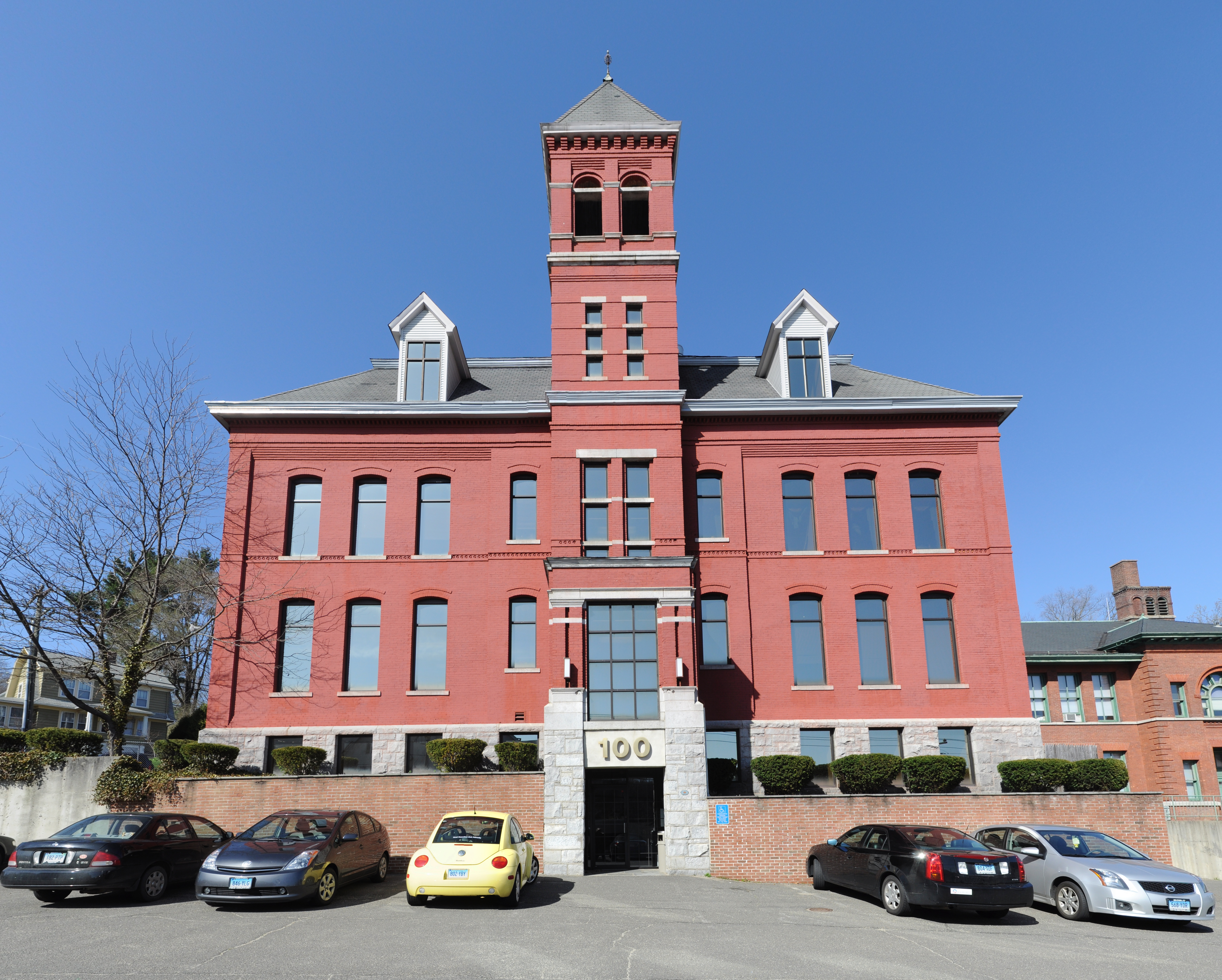
Seymour High School, Seymour, Connecticut, 1885.

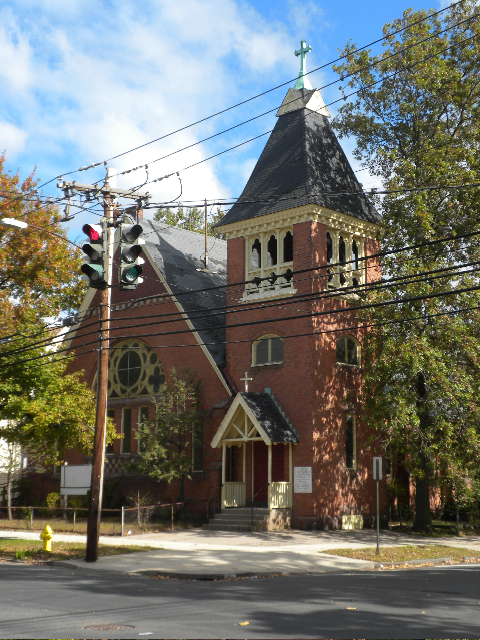
Episcopal Church of the Ascension, New Haven, Connecticut, 1887.

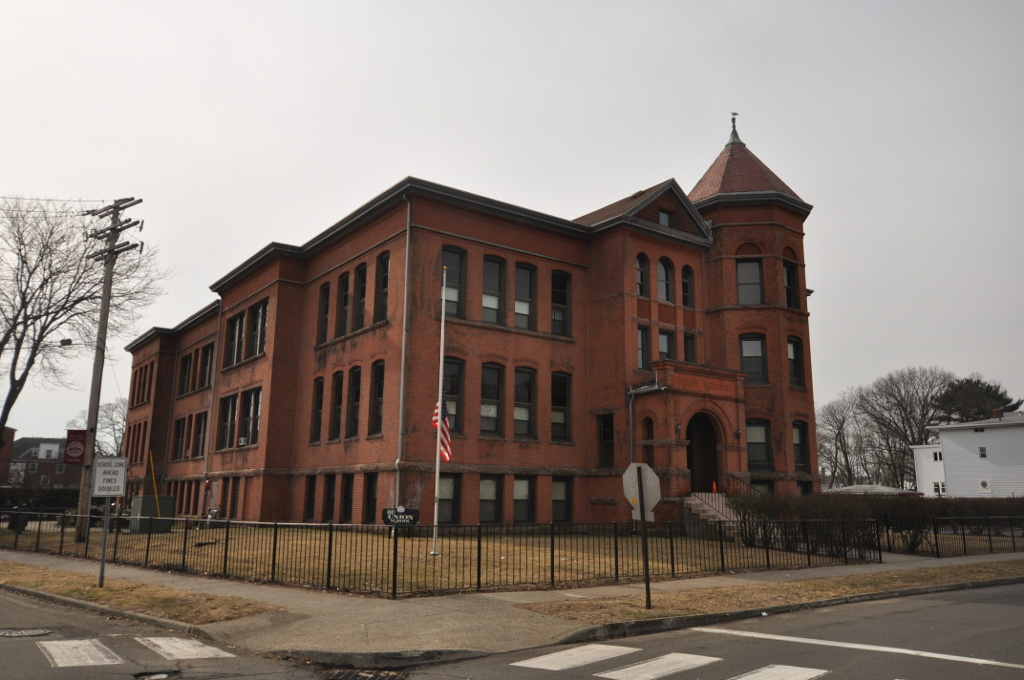
Union School, West Haven, Connecticut, 1890.

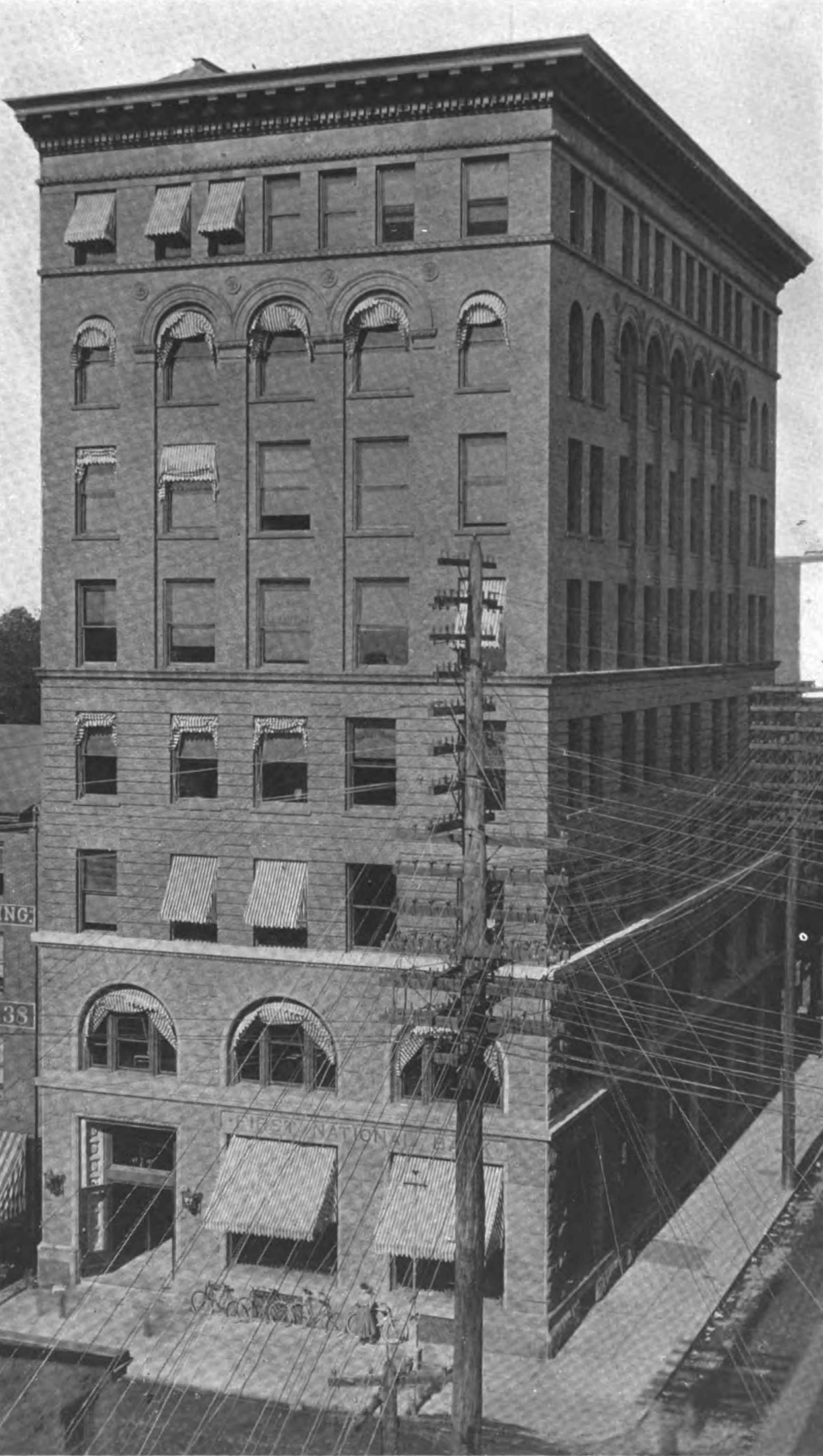
First National Bank Building, New Haven, Connecticut, 1895.

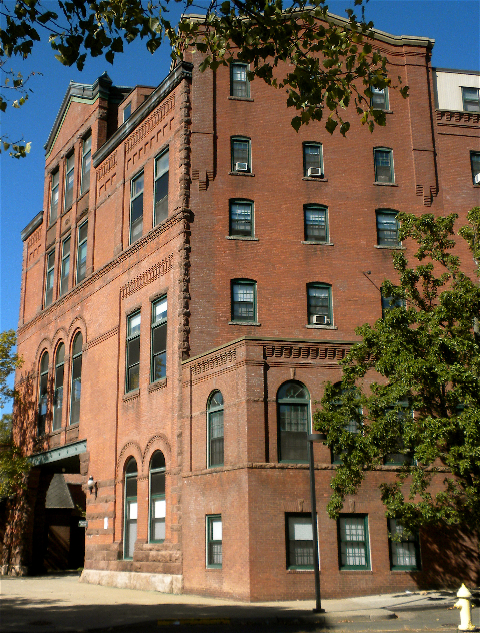
Quinnipiac Brewery addition, Fair Haven, New Haven, Connecticut, 1896.

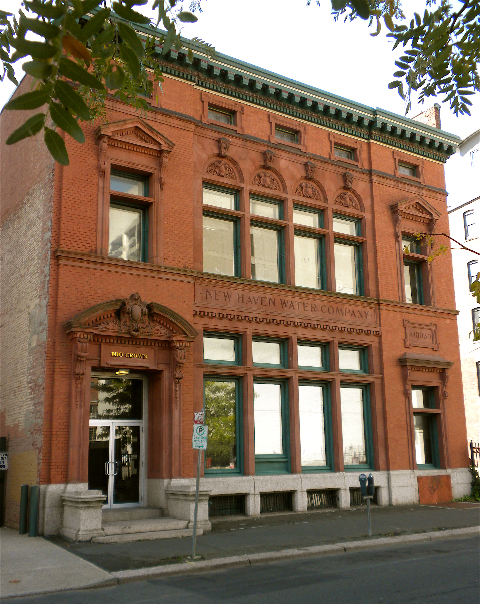
New Haven Water Company Building, New Haven, Connecticut, 1903.

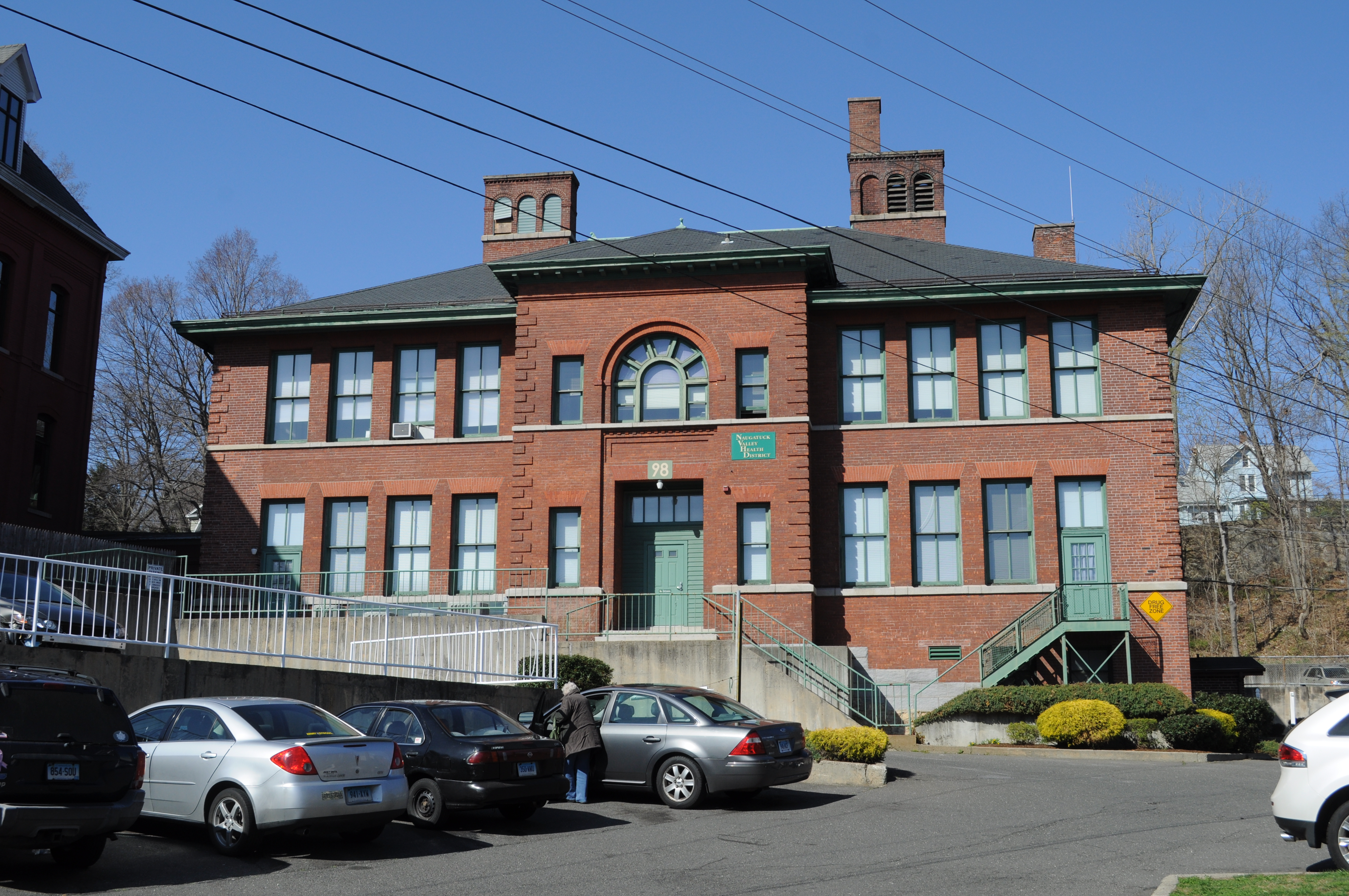
Seymour High School Annex, Seymour, Connecticut, 1905.

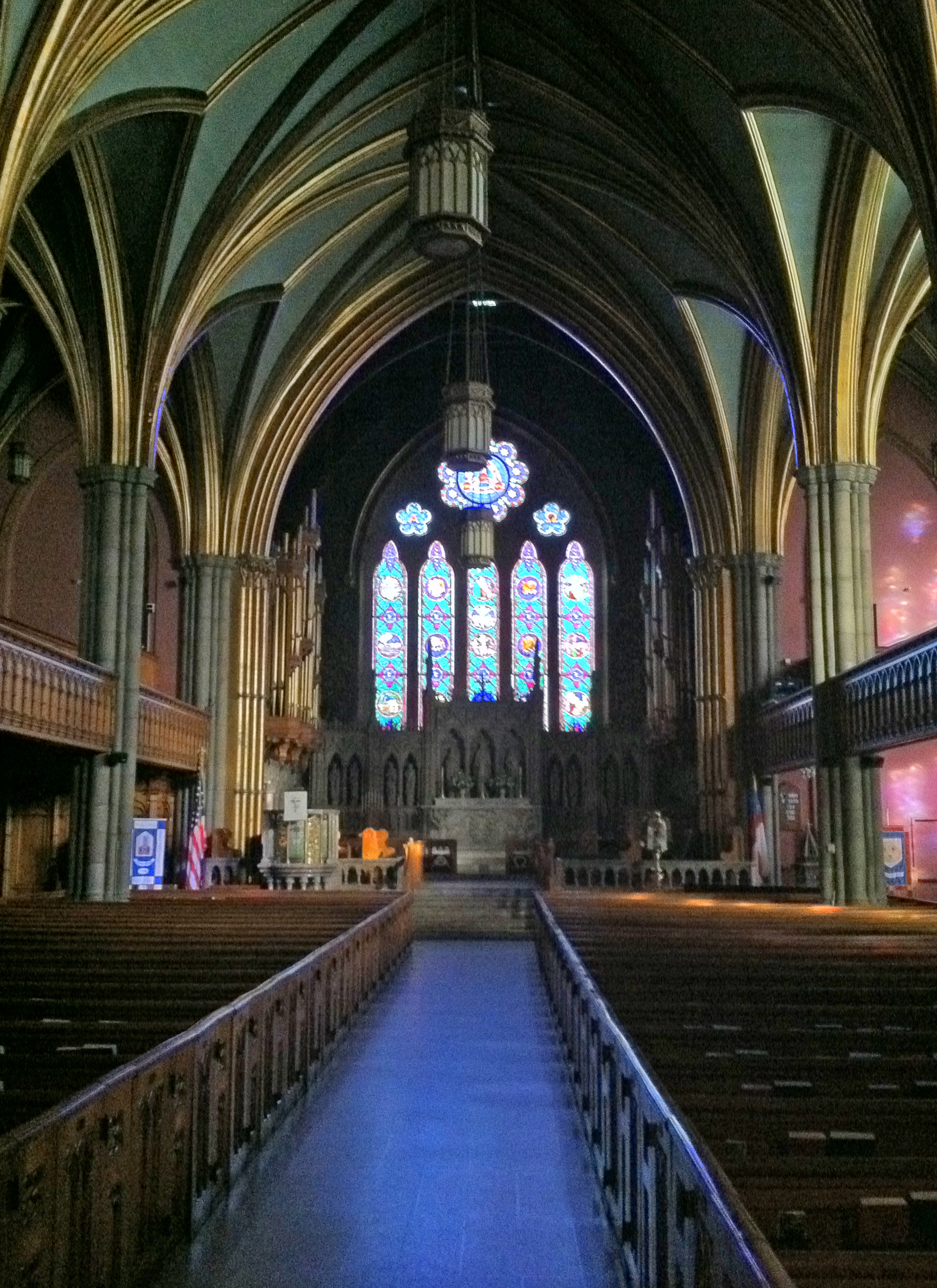
Interior view of Trinity Church on the Green, New Haven, Connecticut, 1906.
