= Beaver Hills, New Haven =

Neighborhood in New Haven, Connecticut

Coordinates: 41.325°N 72.947°W

Beaver Hills is a neighborhood in the city of New Haven, Connecticut. The older, east central portion of the neighborhood is listed on the National Register of Historic Places as the Beaver Hills Historic District. The southwest portion is a state historic district called the Fairlawn-Nettleton Historic District.

The name “Beaver Hills” dates to the Colonial era, when it was a piece of high ground near several "beaver ponds". Geologist James Dwight Dana later attributed the "Beaver Pond" to natural springs, rather than the activity of beavers.

The Beaver Hills Historic District covers 97 acres (39 ha) of the neighborhood north of Goffe Street and east of Ella Grasso Boulevard. It was listed on the National Register of Historic Places in 1986 and included 235 contributing buildings. The listing recognized the district's significance as a nearly intact example of an early 20th-century suburban residential subdivision. The district in 1986 was composed mostly of single-family homes built between 1908 and 1936. One feature of note was the presence of "one of the city's best collections of early 20th-century garages." The district includes brick gateway piers at the intersections of Goffe Terrace with Norton Parkway and with Ellsworth Avenue, at the south end of the district. The piers include "tile plaques depicting beavers" and "were constructed by the Beaver Hills Company in 1908 to define the southern terminus of the neighborhood." Significant contributing properties in the historic district include the Pitkin House (1931 Tudor Revival style house at 207 Colony Road) and the Alan Krevit House (1936 Colonial Revival style house at 186 Colony Road)
