= Welch Training School =

- U.S. National Register of Historic Places
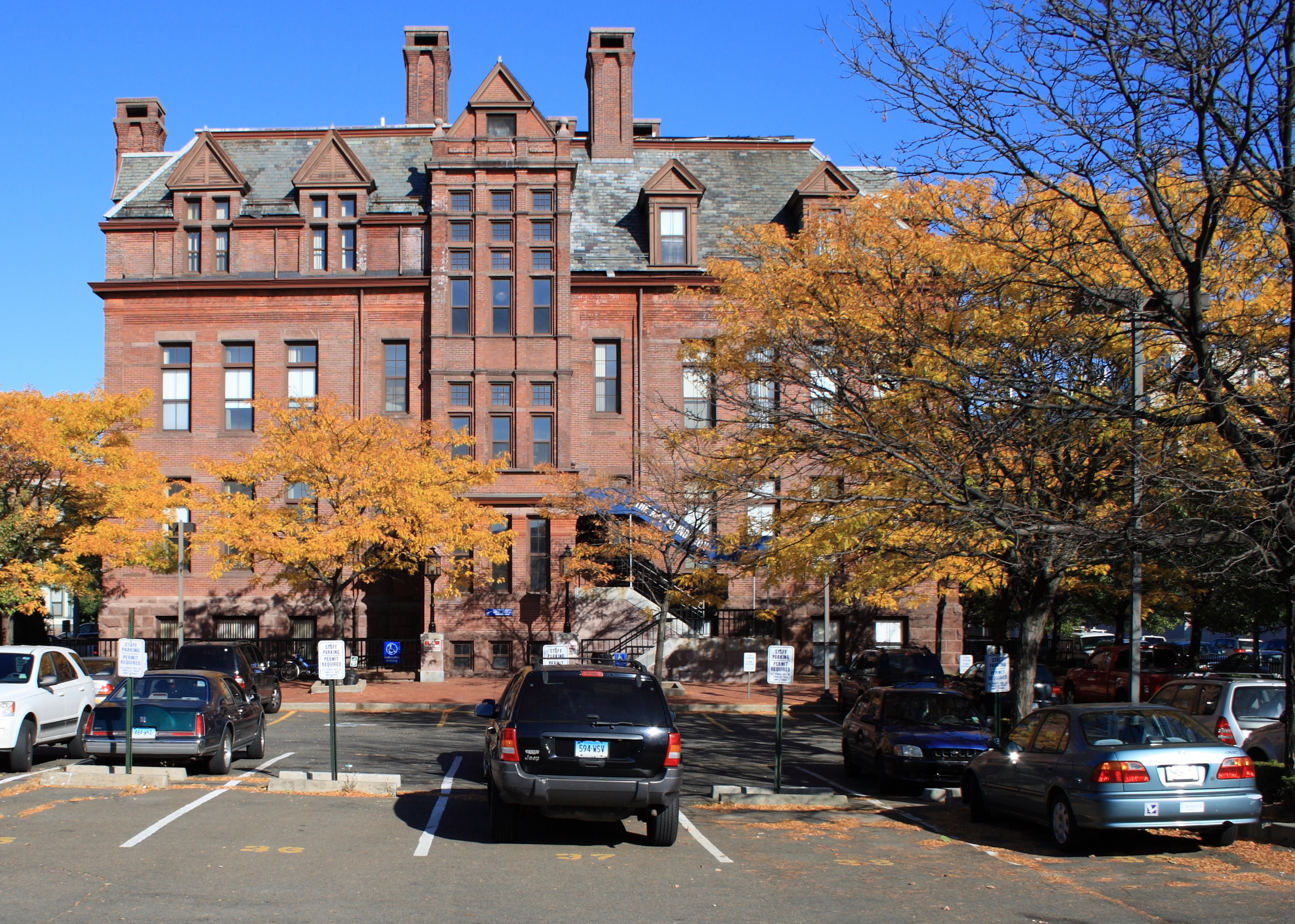

- Location within Connecticut Location within the United States
- Location: 495 Congress Avenue, New Haven, Connecticut
- Coordinates: 41°18′4″N 72°56′15″W
- Area: less than one acre
- Built: 1883
- Architect: Robinson, Leoni W.
- Architectural style: Queen Anne
- NRHP reference No.: 83001286
- Added to NRHP: April 21, 1983

The Welch Training School, also known as the Welch School, is a historic school building at 495 Congress Avenue in New Haven, Connecticut. Built in 1883, it is a good example of Queen Anne architecture as applied to school buildings, and was the city's first teacher training school. It was listed on the National Register of Historic Places in 1983. The building now houses a substance abuse clinic.

== Description and history ==
The former Welch Training School building is located West of Downtown New Haven, at the Northwest Corner of Congress and Vernon Streets in The Hill neighborhood. It is a 3 1/2-story masonry structure, built out of red brick with stone trim, and covered by a slate mansard roof. Gabled dormers of varying styles and configurations adorn the roof faces, and a four-story gabled entry section projects at the center of the main facade. Windows are set in rectangular openings with sandstone sills and lintels, and sandstone stringcourses give horizontal emphasis to the design.

The school, completed in 1883, was designed by Leoni W. Robinson and is a good local example of Queen Anne architecture. It was named for Harmonus Welch, the city's first president of the board of education, and later also Mayor of New Haven. The school was designed to provide a space where new teachers could be trained, in order to address a shortage of qualified teachers in the city's school system. In its early programs, trainee teachers were paired with other teachers to learn teaching methods, before being sent for further hands-on training to other schools. The school's function for teacher training was ended in 1893, when the Skinner School opened as a proper normal school, and this one then became a regular elementary school. It was closed in the mid-1970s.

== See also ==
- National Register of Historic Places listings in New Haven, Connecticut
