= Union School (West Haven, Connecticut) =

- U.S. National Register of Historic Places
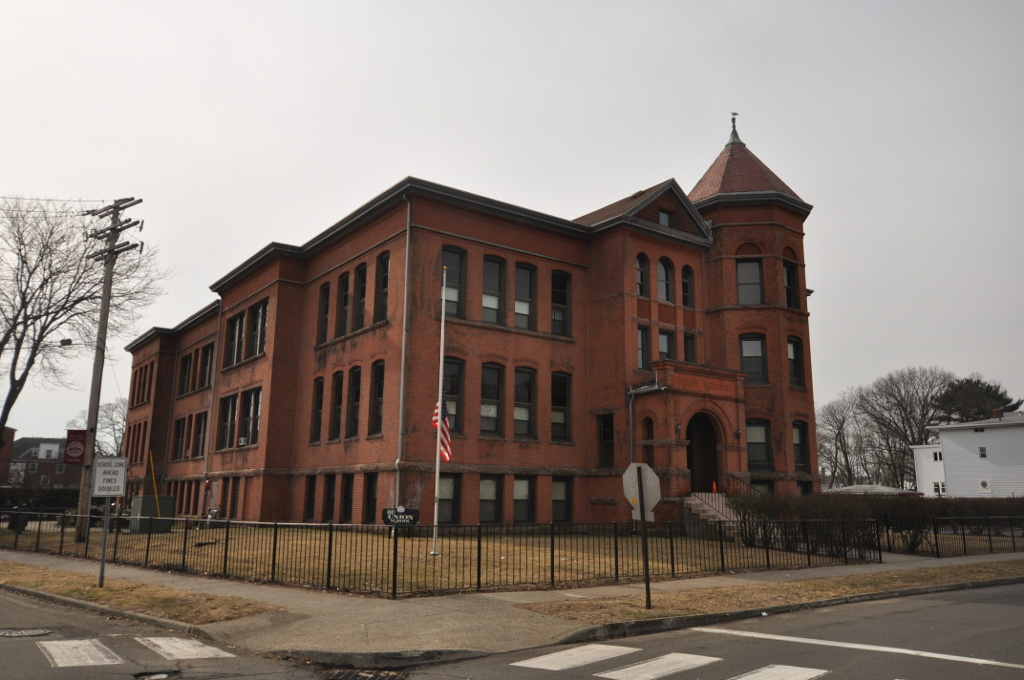

- Location within Connecticut Location within the United States
- Location: 174 Center Street, West Haven, Connecticut
- Coordinates: 41°16′29″N 72°56′49″W
- Area: 1 acre (0.40 ha)
- Built: 1890
- Architect: Leoni W. Robinson
- Architectural style: Late Victorian, Eclectic Victorian
- NRHP reference No.: 87001899
- Added to NRHP: November 13, 1987

The Union School is a historic school building at 174 Center Street in West Haven, Connecticut. Built in 1890, when the area was still part of Orange, it was West Haven's first brick school building, serving as a grammar school and high school for generations of local students. Now a senior living facility, it was listed on the National Register of Historic Places in 1987.

== Description and history ==
West Haven's former Union School stands in a residential area east of the town center, at the southwest corner of Union Avenue and Center Street. It is a two-story brick building with terra cotta and East Haven red sandstone trim, and a hip roof. Its massing is somewhat typical of Queen Anne Victorian residential architecture, with an asymmetrical arrangement of features that include a three-story polygonal tower. Its main entrance is recessed in a projecting bay that features a Romanesque round-arch opening. A nearly identical addition was added to the rear in 1914.

In 1890, West Haven was the most populous part of Orange, with most of the town's student population. Planning for this school began in 1889, and accelerated when one of the nearby district schoolhouses burned down. The new building was designed by architect Leoni W. Robinson, one of New Haven's leading architects of the late 19th century. Some of Robinson's larger-scale industrial works in New Haven bear some resemblance to this school, which opened in 1890. It has been converted to senior housing after serving for many years as a grammar and high school.

== See also ==
- National Register of Historic Places listings in New Haven County, Connecticut
