= Nathaniel Jocelyn =

American artist (1796–1881)

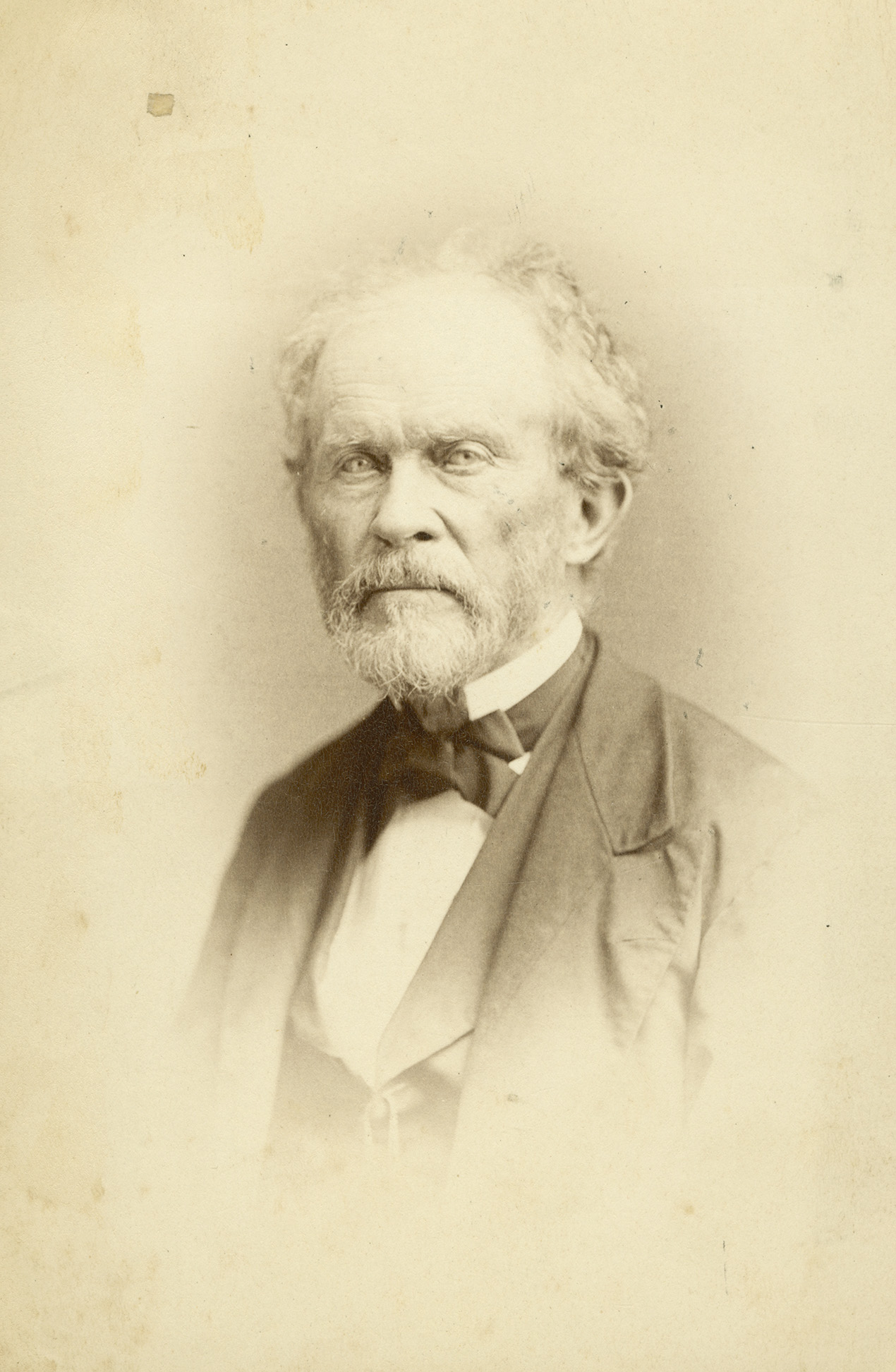
- Nathaniel Jocelyn, c.1870s, albumen print (cabinet card), Department of Image Collections, National Gallery of Art Library, Washington, DC
- Born: January 31, 1796; New Haven, Connecticut
- Died: January 13, 1881 (aged 84); New Haven, Connecticut
- Occupations: portrait painter, printmaker

Nathaniel Jocelyn (January 31, 1796 – January 13, 1881) was an American painter and engraver best known for his portraits of abolitionists and of the slave revolt leader Joseph Cinqué.

== Family and education ==
Nathaniel Jocelyn was born in New Haven, Connecticut, the son of clockmaker and engraver Simeon Jocelin and Luceanah Smith. He trained under his father as a watchmaker, later taking up drawing, engraving, and oil painting. He studied engraving with George Munger around 1813; they published at least one print together under the name Jocelin & Munger. In 1817, Munger painted one of the few known portraits of Jocelyn.

The inventor Eli Whitney also helped to foster his career, and in 1820 he briefly worked in the studio of Samuel F. B. Morse. Later, in 1829–30, he furthered his education by touring Europe with Morse and the architect Ithiel Town.

During the War of 1812, at the age of 16, he volunteered for the Governor's Foot Guard, which defended the city of Madison, Connecticut.

In 1818, he married Sarah Atwater Plant of New Haven. They had six daughters and a son, Isaac, who died at the age of six.

== Career ==
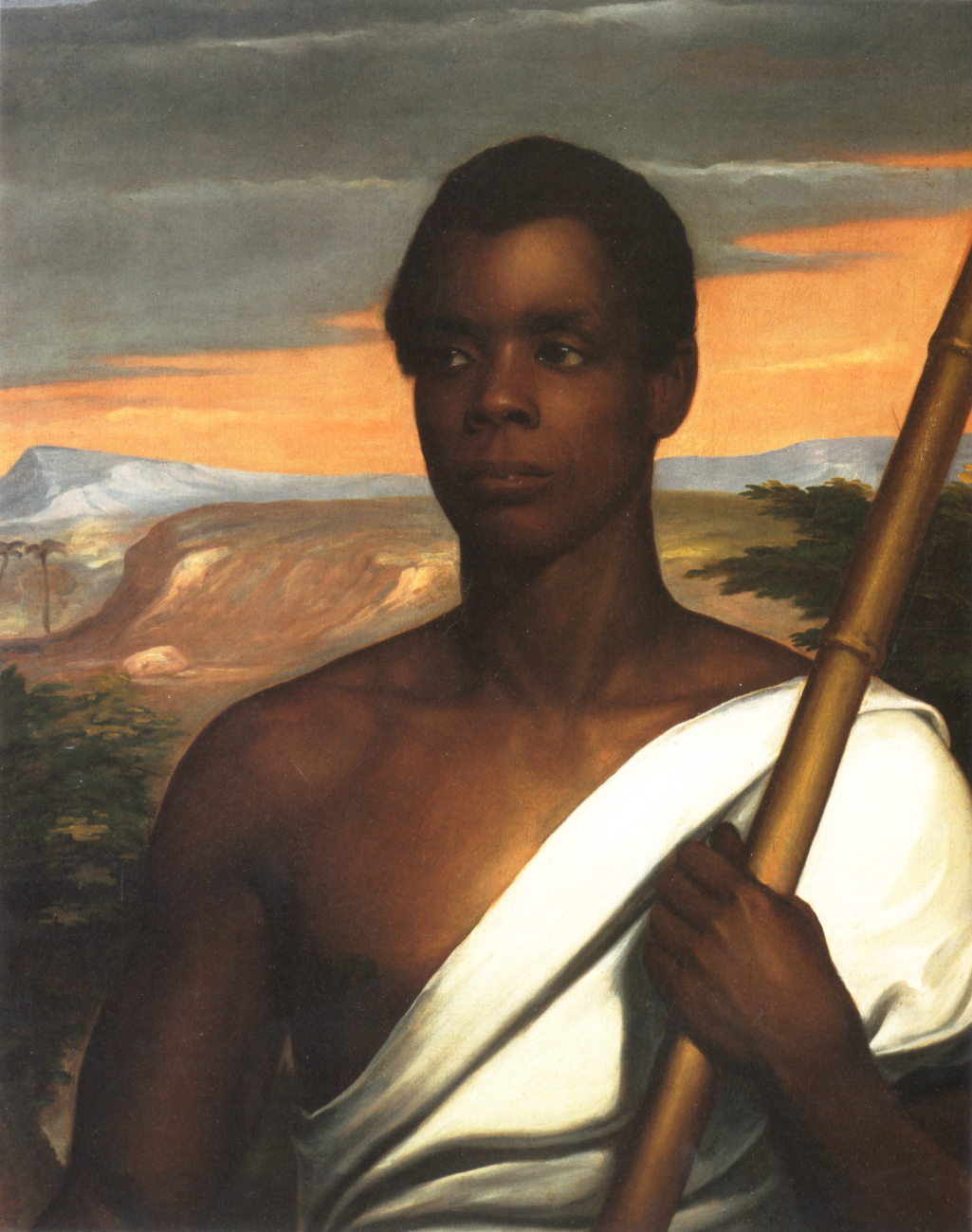
Joseph Cinqué's portrait by Nathaniel Jocelyn, 1839

In 1817, Jocelyn moved to Hartford, Connecticut, where helped set up the Hartford Graphic and Bank Note Engraving Company. From 1820 to 1822 he lived in Savannah, Georgia, where he established himself as a painter of portraits and miniatures. On returning to New Haven in 1822, he continued as a portraitist. He was an abolitionist, and among his sitters were several notable abolitionists, including William Lloyd Garrison. Garrison declared that Jocelyn's portrait was a "tolerable likeness," but remarked that "those who imagine that I am a monster, on seeing it will... deny its accuracy, seeing no horns about the head."

Another of Jocelyn's well-known works is his 1839 portrait of Joseph Cinqué, leader of a revolt on the Spanish slave ship La Amistad. Jocelyn and his brother Simeon were also active in seeking legal counsel for Cinqué's defense.

In 1827 he was elected an Associate of the National Academy of Design, and he became a full Academician in 1846. Throughout his career, he often showed work at the academy's annual exhibitions.

Jocelyn continued as an engraver alongside his portrait business. In the 1830s, he and his brother Simeon Smith Jocelyn founded and ran an engraving company under the name N. & S. S. Jocelyn.

From 1843 to 1847, Jocelyn had a second portrait studio in New York City. His New Haven studio burned in 1849, and for a time he gave up painting for engraving, initially with the firm of Toppan, Carpenter & Co. He went on to found the National Bank Note Engraving Company, where he served as head of the art department through to the end of the Civil War.

After the war, he returned to painting, working out of a studio provided for him at the recently founded Yale School of Art, where he served as curator of Italian art. He retired in 1864 and died in New Haven.

== Legacy ==
In 1858, Jocelyn and his brother gave a piece of land to the city of New Haven to be used as public park and playground. It is now known as Jocelyn Square.

Many of Jocelyn's portraits are in the collection of Yale University.
