= Quinnipiac Brewery =

- U.S. National Register of Historic Places
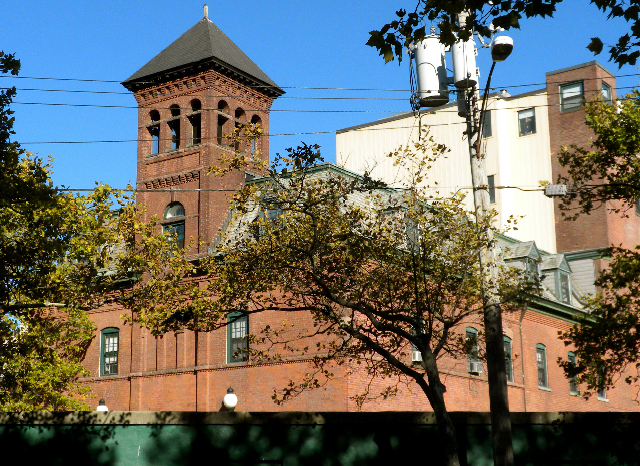

- Location within Connecticut Location within the United States
- Location: 19-23 River Street, New Haven, Connecticut
- Coordinates: 41°18′14″N 72°53′37″W
- Area: 2.5 acres (1.0 ha)
- Built: 1882
- Architect: Leoni W. Robinson, others
- Architectural style: Romanesque, Romanesque Revival
- NRHP reference No.: 83001285
- Added to NRHP: July 15, 1983

The Quinnipiac Brewery, also known as Brewery Square, is a complex of brick buildings at 19-23 River Street in the Fair Haven neighborhood of New Haven, Connecticut. Developed beginning in 1892 and operative until the 1930s, the complex is a rare example of a late 19th-century large-scale (for the time) brewery. The complex was listed on the National Register of Historic Places in 1983. Most of the complex is now residences.

== Description and history ==
The Quinnipiac Brewery complex is located in a primarily residential area in southeastern Fair Haven, on about 2.5 acres (1.0 ha) bounded by Front Street, Ferry Street, and the Quinnipiac River. Its dominant feature is the six-story Romanesque main brewery building, built in 1882 and given its present facade in 1896. The other major buildings are an office building, also dating to the 1880s, and the bottling plant, built in 1916. The brewery plan is representative of the transition of beer production from smaller local breweries to those producing it on a more industrial scale. It had larger above-ground facilities, made possible by advances in refrigeration, and its bottling plant, a recent innovation, was located across a public way (East Pearl Street) to satisfy tax authorities.

The Quinnipiac Brewery was founded in 1882 by two German-Americans, Peter Schleipmann and William Spittler, during the height of development of breweries producing lager beers. The business was economically successful, undergoing several expansions through the mid-1910s, but was shut down with the advent of Prohibition in 1919. During Prohibition, the plant was sold to another business which produced cereal beverages. After Prohibition ended, the plant was acquired by the New Haven Brewing Company, which produced beer for about ten years. The plant stood either vacant or as a warehouse until the late 1970s. It has since been adaptively repurposed to house residences.

== See also ==
- National Register of Historic Places listings in New Haven, Connecticut
- List of defunct breweries in the United States

== Gallery ==
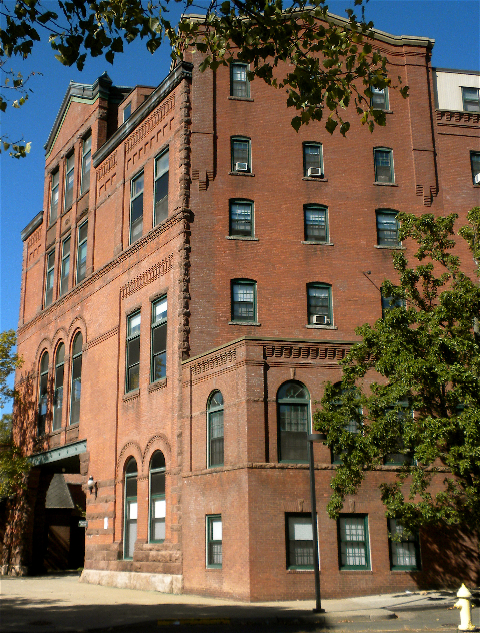
Quinnipiac Brewing Company (1881-1897).

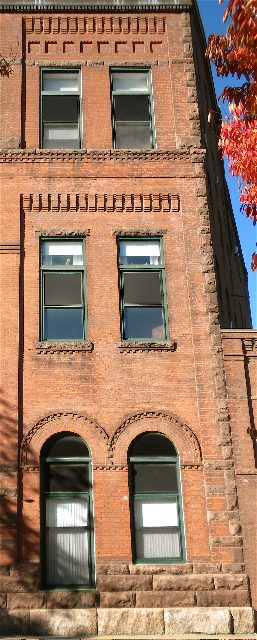
Quinnipiac Brewing Company, detail.

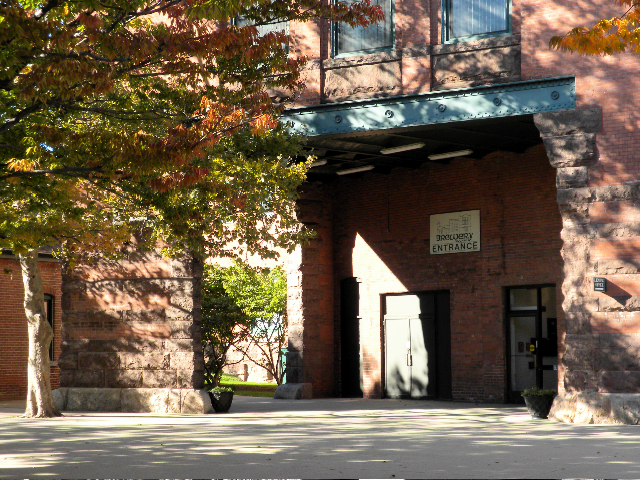
Square archway for Brewery rail line.

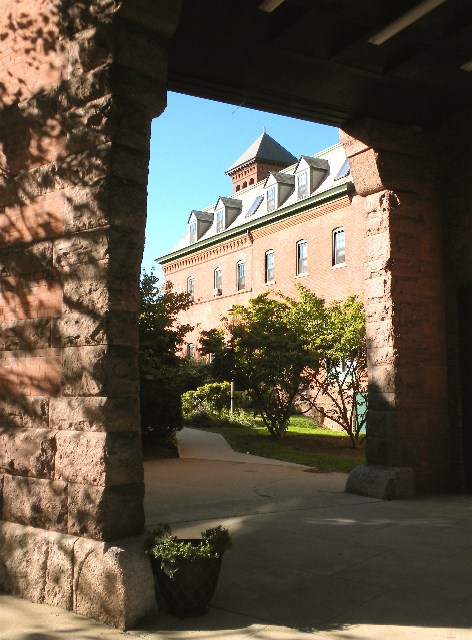
Square archway for Brewery rail line.

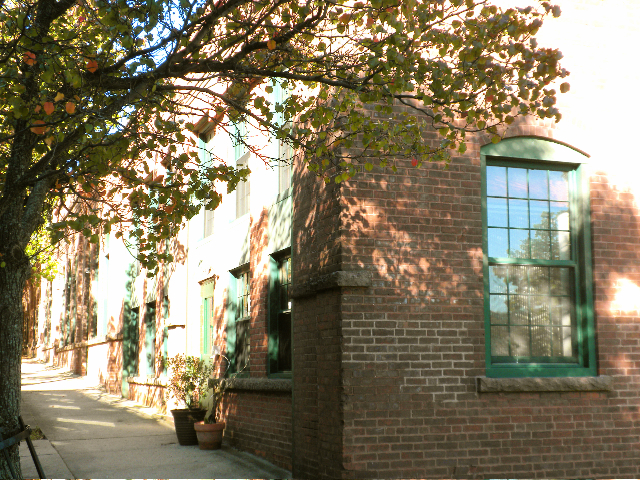
Quinnipiac Brewery bottling plant (1913).

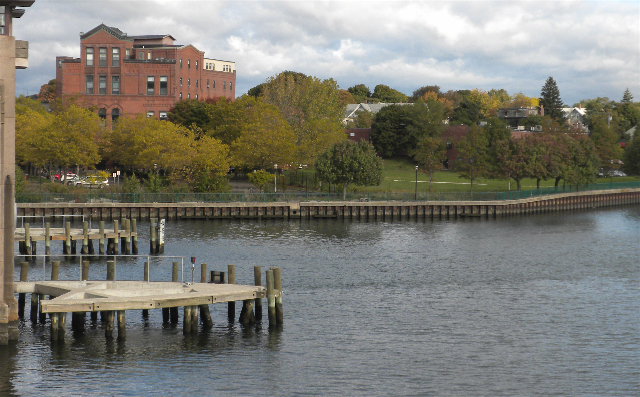
Quinnipiac Brewing Company site from Ferry St. Bridge.
