= Mill River, New Haven =

Neighborhood in New Haven, Connecticut

Coordinates: 41.307°N 72.910°W

Mill River is a primarily industrial neighborhood in the city of New Haven, Connecticut located between the Wooster Square and Fair Haven neighborhoods.

The area is bordered on the east by the Mill River (from I-95 up to the vicinity of Humphrey Street) then by Amtrak railroad tracks (up to Blatchley Avenue). It is bordered on the west and northwest by Interstate 91 (between Exits 2 and 6), and on the south by Interstate 95. There are two clusters of residential areas in the neighborhood, Farnam Courts, which are low cost apartments managed by the Housing Authority of New Haven, and the area around Jocelyn Square, which was traditionally part of the Upper State Street neighborhood. The northeastern corner of the area east of the river between I-91 (from Exit 5 to 6) and the railroad tracks, where the garage for Connecticut Transit New Haven is located, is also considered to be part of the community known as Cedar Hill. Hamilton Street and East Street are the main north–south thoroughfares, while Humphrey Street, Grand Avenue, and Chapel Street serve as east–west through routes.

English Station, an abandoned power plant, is located on Ball Island in Mill River.

== See also ==
- Northeast Corridor
