= New Haven Jewish Home for the Aged =

- U.S. National Register of Historic Places
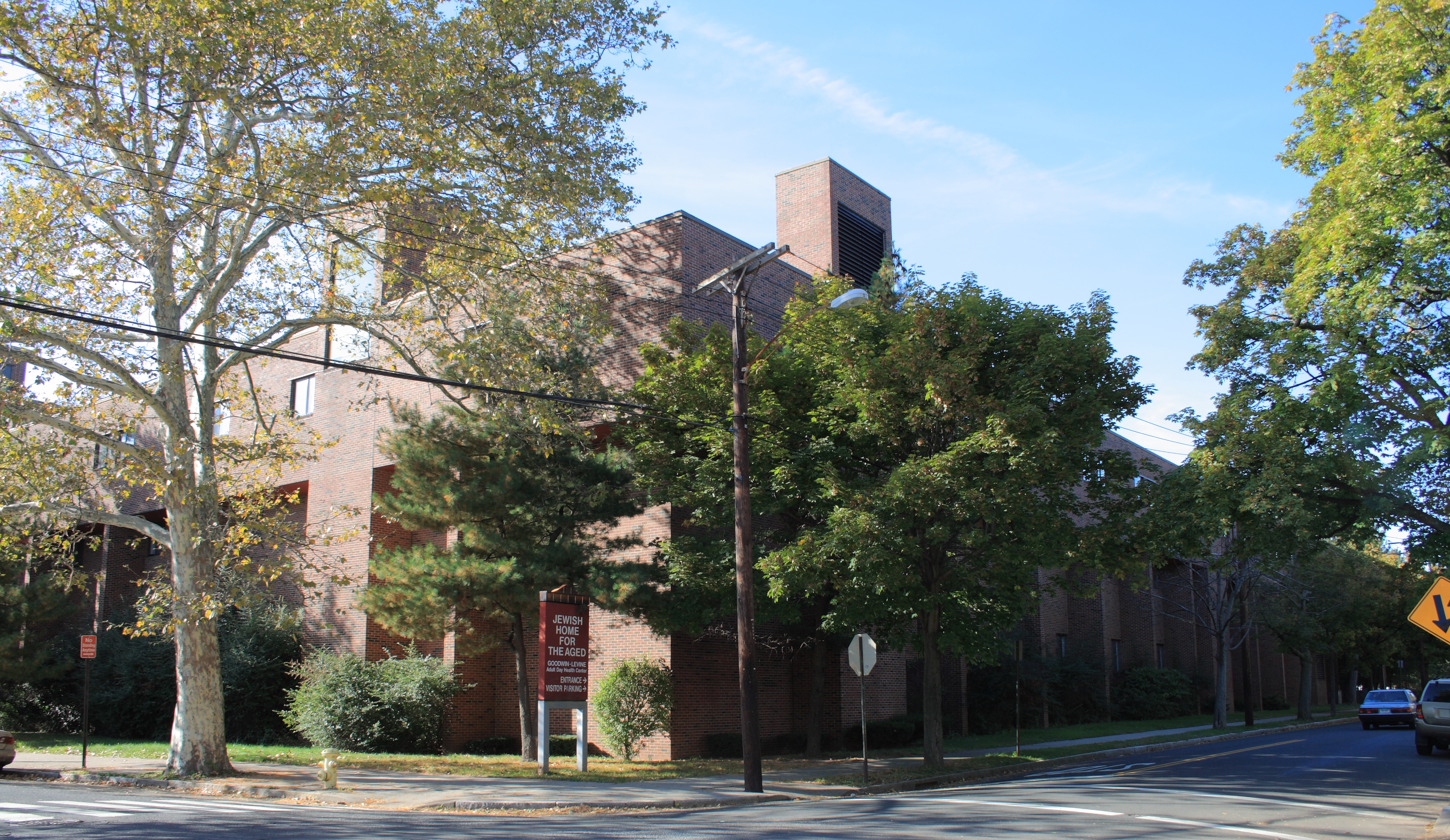
- New Haven Jewish Home for the Aged, 1974 extension

- Location within Connecticut Location within the United States
- Location: 169 Davenport Avenue, New Haven, Connecticut
- Coordinates: 41°18′9″N 72°56′23″W
- Area: 3.7 acres (1.5 ha)
- Built: 1921
- Architect: Brown & von Beren
- Architectural style: Beaux Arts
- NRHP reference No.: 79002641
- Added to NRHP: June 19, 1979

The New Haven Jewish Home for the Aged is a historic nursing home at 169 Davenport Avenue in the Hill neighborhood of New Haven, Connecticut. Completed in 1923 and repeatedly enlarged thereafter, it was the second organization in the state to provide housing and medical care to the local elderly and indigent Jewish population. The building, still in use as a nursing home, was listed on the National Register of Historic Places in 1979.

== Description and history ==
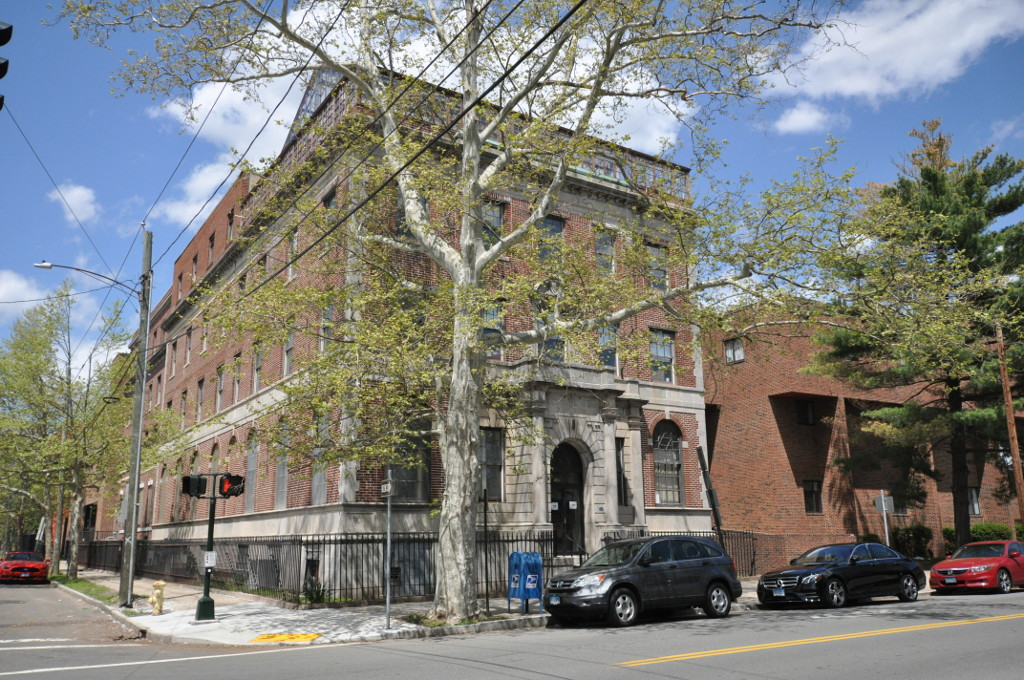
The 1920s section of the home

The New Haven Jewish Home for the Aged is located a few blocks west of the Yale–New Haven Hospital on the city's west side, bounded on two sides by Asylum Street, and Davenport Avenue. It is a large four-story masonry structure, built out of brick, steel, and concrete, with the oldest portion at the northeast corner of Davenport and Asylum. That portion has fine Beaux Arts styling, with the entrance projecting slightly at the center of a five bay facade. Modern wings extend to the rear and right of the original block.

The New Haven Jewish Home was organized in 1914, the second such charity to be founded in the state, after a similar one in Hartford. It was founded by the Sisters of Zion, a local women's group, and operated out of a residence at the present address. It grew rapidly, serving the Jewish population of southern Connecticut and all the way to New York City. The oldest portion of the present building was built in 1921-23, to a design by local architects Brown & von Beren. It was enlarged in 1950 and again in the mid-1970s, even after calls were made to move out of what had become a significantly crime-ridden neighborhood.

== See also ==
- National Register of Historic Places listings in New Haven, Connecticut
