= Connecticut State Board of Education =

Government agency

The Connecticut State Board of Education is the governing body of the Connecticut State Department of Education, which oversees the public education in the state's 201 local school districts.

The State Board of Education consists of 16 members, 11 voting and 5 non-voting members. The governor appoints the members to the board and the General Assembly confirms their appointment. The governor also appoints the Commissioner of Education, who serves as the head of the Connecticut State Department of Education for a term coterminous with that of the Governor.

== Members (as of November 2026) ==
Connecticut State Board of Education
Member	Title
Charlene M. Russell-Tucker	Commissioner of Education
Erin D. Benham	Vice-Chairperson
Bonnie E. Burr	Member
Dr. Evan Pitkoff	Member
Dr. Gladys B. Labas	Member
Donald F. Harris Jr.	Member
Kristen A. Record	Member
Dr. Seth D. Zimmerman	Member
Paula S. Gilberto	Member
(Vacant)	Member
(Vacant)	Member
(Vacant)	Member
Shruti Shah	Student Representative
Shepard Fisher	Student Representative
(Vacant)	Higher Education Representative
Dr. Kelli-Marie Vallieres	Workforce Representative

== Student Board Members ==
From 1998 to 2026, under state legislation passed during the 1998 session of the Connecticut General Assembly (Substitute Senate Bill 261), there were two non-voting one-year term (July 1st to June 30th) seats on the Connecticut State Board of Education for public high school seniors.

Student Board Members (Historical)
Student Name	Term Served	High School	District
Shruti Shah	2026–2027	South Windsor High School	South Windsor Public Schools
Shepard Fisher	2026–2027	Francis T. Maloney High School	Meriden Public Schools
Hansika Lenkala	2025–2026	East Granby High School	East Granby Public Schools
Samarth Basanth	2025–2026	South Windsor High School	South Windsor Public Schools
Sophia Messina	2024–2025	Amity Regional High School	Regional School District 5
Sreenidi Bala	2024–2025	South Windsor High School	South Windsor Public Schools
Yasmeen Galal	2023–2024	Woodland Regional High School	Regional School District 16
Connor Cowan	2023–2024	Fairfield Public High School	Fairfield Public Schools
Praja Tickoo	2022–2023	New Canaan High School	New Canaan Public Schools
	2022–2023		
Natalie Bandura	2021–2022	Staples High School	Westport Public Schools
Rishabh Bhandari	2021–2022	Wilton High School	Wilton Public Schools
	2020–2021		
	2020–2021		
Sophia Chin	2019–2020	South Windsor High School	South Windsor Public Schools
Milan Chand	2019–2020	Newtown High School	Newtown Public Schools
Tarini Krishna	2018–2019	Ridgefield High School	Ridgefield Public Schools
Makayla Dawkins	2018–2019	James Hillhouse High School	New Haven Public Schools
Jaweria Shah	2017–2018	Hamden High School	Hamden Public Schools
Saomai Nguyen	2017–2018	Hall High School	West Hartford Public Schools
Coral Ortiz	2016–2017	Hill Regional Career High School	New Haven Public Schools
Amina Lampkin	2016–2017	Hall High School	West Hartford Public Schools
Timothy Noel-Sullivan	2015–2016	Classical Magnet School	Hartford Public Schools
Susannah Beyl	2015–2016	West Haven High School	West Haven Public Schools
Megan Foell	2014–2015	Thomaston High School	Thomaston Public Schools
Michael Caminear	2014–2015	Branford High School	Branford Public Schools
Clayton Potter	2013–2014	Science & Technology Magnet High School	New London Public Schools
Jake Colavolpe	2013–2014	The Sound School	New Haven Public Schools
Andreea Dinicu	2012–2013	Glastonbury High School	Glastonbury Public Schools
	2012–2013		
Simon Brewer	2011–2012	Wilton High School	Wilton Public Schools
Joshua Friedman	2011–2012	Stamford High School	Stamford Public Schools
	2010–2011		
	2010–2011		
Hannah Klein	2009–2010	Amity Regional High School	Regional School District 5
Hunter Kodama	2009–2010	Wheeler High School	North Stonington Public Schools
	2008–2009		
	2008–2009		
	2007–2008		
	2007–2008		
Sloan Danehower	2006–2007	Old Lyme High School	Regional School District 18
Edna Chukwurah	2006–2007		Bridgeport Public Schools
Rebecca Crosswaith	2005–2006		
A'ine McCarthy	2005–2006	Waterford High School	Waterford Public Schools
Tori Hendrix	2004–2005	Thomaston High School	Thomaston Public Schools
Callan Walsh	2004–2005	Wilton High School	Wilton Public Schools
Yi-Mei Truxes	2003–2004	Westbrook High School	Westbrook Public Schools
Daniel Martinez	2003–2004		
Natalie Ivanhoff	2002–2003		
	2002–2003		
	2001–2002		
	2001–2002		
	2000–2001		
	2000–2001		
	1999-2000		
	1999-2000		
Danielle Robles	1998–1999		Bridgeport Public Schools
Daniel Kruger	1998–1999	Housatonic Valley Regional High School	Regional School District 1

Out of the 41 known student board members, 11 have come from Alliance Districts (a state-designated group of the lowest-performing school districts). Students in Alliance Districts make up roughly 44% of the state's total student body. The most recent student to be appointed from an Alliance District is Shepard Fisher (2026-2027) from Meriden Public Schools.

== See also ==
- List of admission tests to colleges and universities
- Education in Connecticut
- New England Association of Schools and Colleges (NEASC)
