= Southern New England Telephone Company Building =

- U.S. National Register of Historic Places
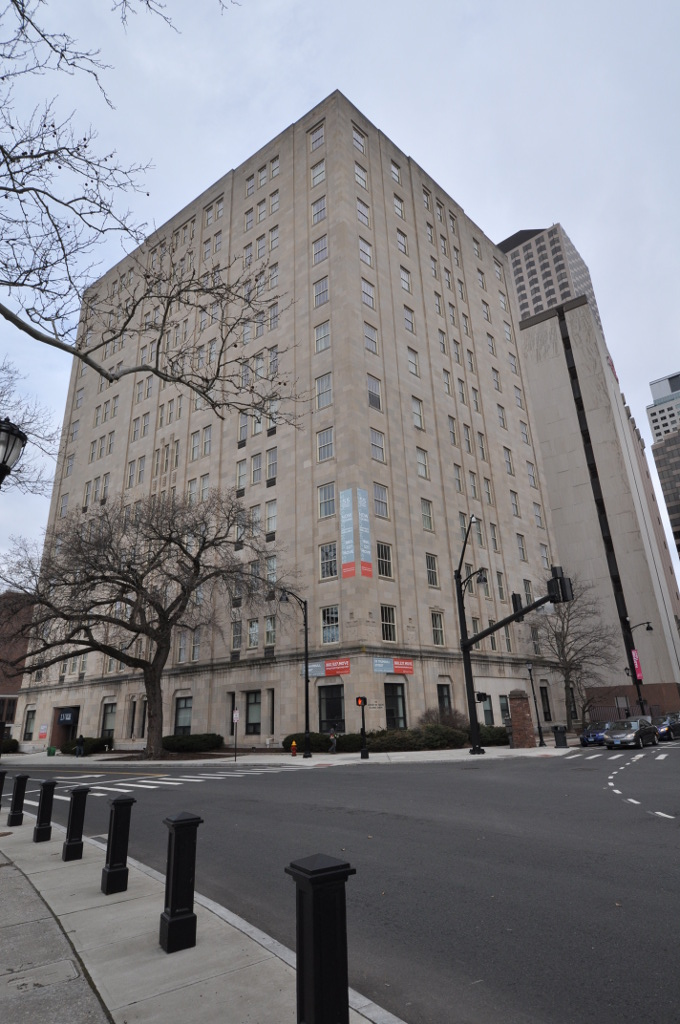

- Location within Connecticut Location within the United States
- Location: 55 Trumbull Street, Hartford, Connecticut
- Coordinates: 41°45′56″N 72°40′36″W
- Area: less than one acre
- Built: 1931
- Architect: Foote, Roy W.; et al.
- Architectural style: Art Deco
- NRHP reference No.: 04000417
- Added to NRHP: May 12, 2004

The Southern New England Telephone Company Building is a historic high-rise office building at 55 Trumbull Street in Hartford, Connecticut. It is a twelve-story Art Deco building built in 1931 for the Southern New England Telephone Company, which occupied it into the 1990s. Now mainly residential, it was listed on the National Register of Historic Places in 2004.

== Description and history ==
The former Southern New England Telephone Company Building is located on the South Side of Downtown Hartford, at the Northwest Corner of Jewell and Trumbull Streets, overlooking Bushnell Park. It is twelve stories in height, faced with granite and limestone, and has Art Deco styling. The main facade faces Jewell Street, and is fifteen bays wide, organized in a 1-3-2-3-2-3-1 pattern articulated by piers that have Art Deco relief carvings at the base of the second story. The present main entrance is in the second grouping from the left, framed by a decorated rectangular surround.

The building was designed by the architectural firm of Roy Foote, and its first six stories were completed in 1931. It was provisioned for enlargement at that time, and another six stories were added in 1952, designed by Westcott and Mapes to seamlessly integrated with the existing structure. The Southern New England Telephone Company, for many years Connecticut's major telephone service provider, housed offices and switching equipment in the building. The company was the first to introduce dial service, which began operation in Hartford in 1922. The company began moving out of the premises in the 1970s, and fully vacated it in the late 1990s.

== See also ==
- National Register of Historic Places listings in Hartford, Connecticut
