= Elm Street Historic District (New Haven, Connecticut) =

Coordinates: 41.309°N 72.924°W

Elm Street Historic District is a state historic district in the downtown area of New Haven, Connecticut. The area is eligible for listing, but not yet listed, on the National Register of Historic Places. The district is roughly bounded by Wall, Orange, Elm, and College Streets. It includes the New Haven Free Public Library, the New Haven County Courthouse, The Eli, the Union and New Haven Trust Building, the Yale School of Music, and the Yale University Press building.

== See also ==
- Fairlawn-Nettleton Historic District and Redfield & West Streets Historic District, other state historic districts in New Haven that are not listed on the National Register of Historic Places
