= Redfield & West Streets Historic District =

Coordinates: 41.2986°N 72.9411°W

Redfield & West Streets Historic District is a state-designated historic district in New Haven, Connecticut. It is located in The Hill neighborhood in southern New Haven.

It consists of a single city block, bordered on the south by Columbus Avenue (US Route 1), on the Northeast by Redfield Street, on the north by Congress Avenue, and on the southwest by West Street Both Sides of West and Redfield Streets in the block are within the district, but only the South Side of Congress Avenue and the North Side of Columbus Avenue

== See also ==
- Fairlawn-Nettleton Historic District and Elm Street Historic District, other state historic districts in New Haven that are not listed on the National Register of Historic Places
