= Beaver Hills Historic District =

Historic district in Connecticut, United States

- U.S. National Register of Historic Places
- U.S. Historic district
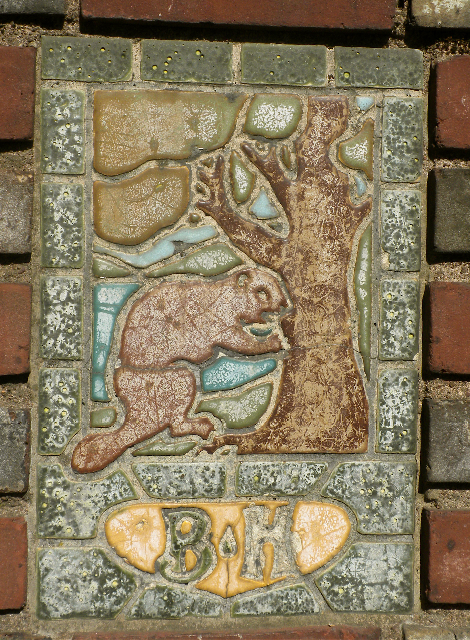

- Location within Connecticut Location within the United States
- Location: Roughly bounded by Crescent Street, Goffe Terrace, and Boulevard, New Haven, Connecticut
- Coordinates: 41°19′28″N 72°56′39″W
- Area: 97 acres (39 ha)
- Built: 1870
- Architect: Beaver Hills Co.; Et al.
- Architectural style: Colonial Revival, Bungalow/Craftsman, Tudor Revival
- NRHP reference No.: 86002108
- Added to NRHP: July 31, 1986

The Beaver Hills Historic District is a 97-acre (39 ha) historic district in the Beaver Hills neighborhood of New Haven, Connecticut. It was listed on the National Register of Historic Places in 1986. In 1986, it included 235 contributing buildings.

According to its 1986 nomination, the district is significant as a nearly intact example of an early 20th-century suburban residential subdivision. The district in 1986 was composed mostly of single-family homes built between 1908 and 1936. The most common architectural styles are Colonial Revival, Tudor Revival and Bungalow. Queen Anne, Spanish Colonial Revival, Prairie and other styles are also represented. One feature of note was the presence of "one of the city's best collections of early 20th-century garages."

Significant contributing properties in the historic district include:

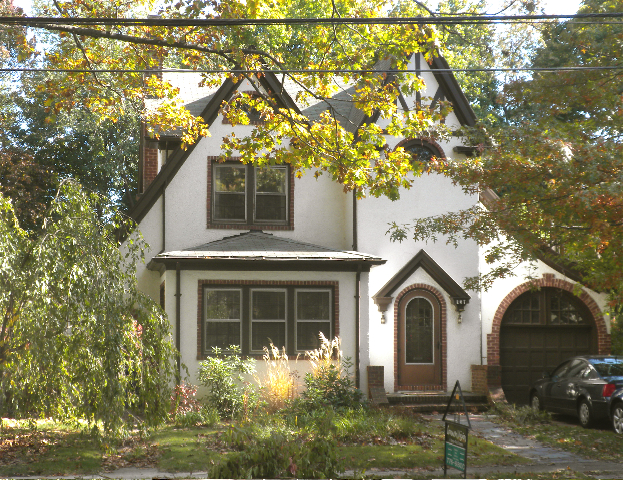
Tudor Revival, Pitkin House, 207 Colony Road (1931)

- Pitkin House, from 1931, a Tudor Revival style house at 207 Colony Road A 2 1/2-story "frame house with gable roof, front gable pavilions, stuccoed/half-timbered exterior" (see NRHP-nomination-accompanying photo #22)

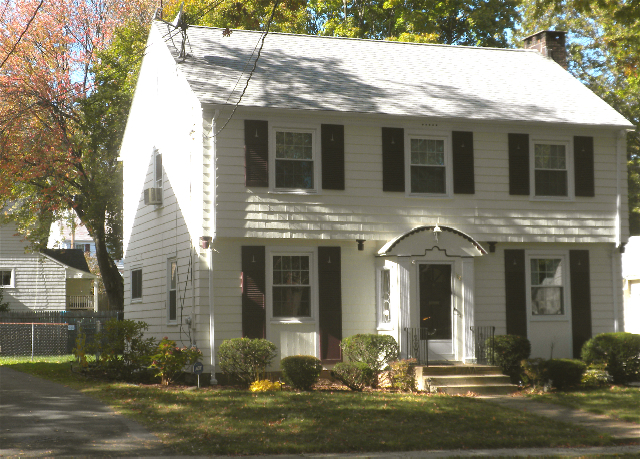
Colonial Revival, Alan Krevit House, 186 Colony Road (1936)

- Alan Krevit House, from 1936, a 2 1/2-story Colonial Revival style frame house with gable roof, at 186 Colony Road

The district includes brick gateway piers at the intersections of Goffe Terrace with Norton Parkway and with Ellsworth Avenue, at the South End of the District. The piers include "tile plaques depicting beavers" and "were constructed by the Beaver Hills Company in 1908 to define the southern terminus of the neighborhood." (see photo #13)

== History ==
The Beaver Hills area was given its name in colonial times, due to the large numbers of beavers that frequented local ponds. Until the turn of the 20th century, the area was farmland. After farmer George Mead died in 1906, his heirs began subdividing his farm for residential development, and also acquiring portions of adjacent farms for that purpose. They formed the Beaver Hills Development Company, which laid out streets, developed some of the housing lots itself, and sold off others, with restrictive covenants governing the size and quality of the construction to take place. The company built gates at the southern entries in order to give the neighborhood a sense of exclusiveness, and also built a neighborhood clubhouse. The company continued to develop the area until 1938, when it sold off the last of the lots it controlled. Development of the neighboring Farnham farm proceeded in a somewhat similar manner beginning in the 1920s, with virtually identical restrictive covenants to those of the Beaver Hills Company.

== Gallery ==
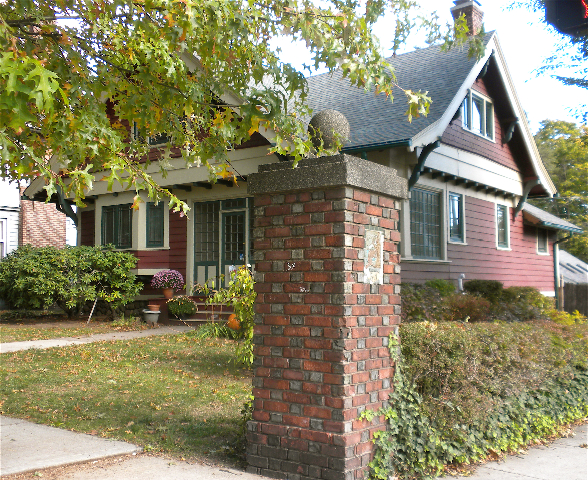
389 Norton Parkway at Goffe Terrace (1908), gate cottage with pier and tile beaver plaque.

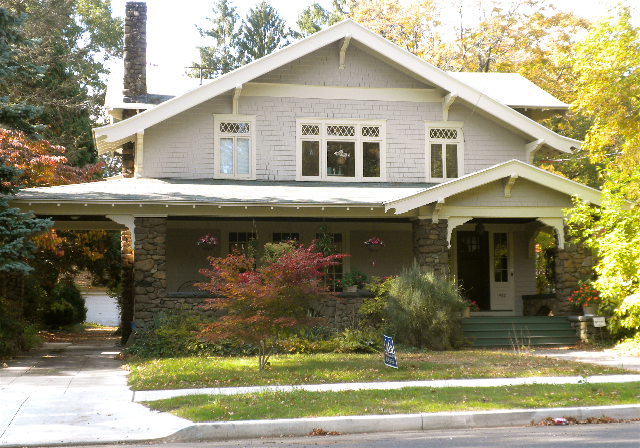
460 Ellsworth Avenue (1912) with porte-cochère.

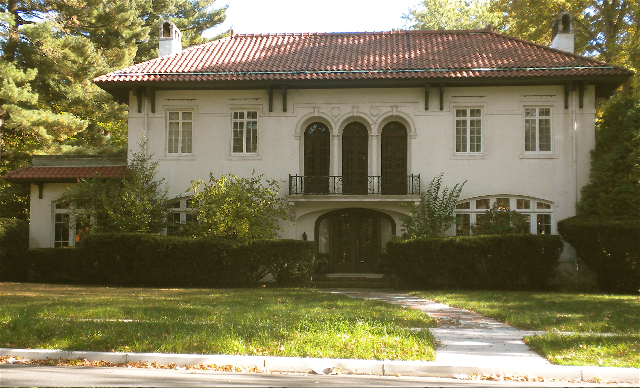
Italian villa, 475 Ellsworth Avenue (1915), R. W. Foote.

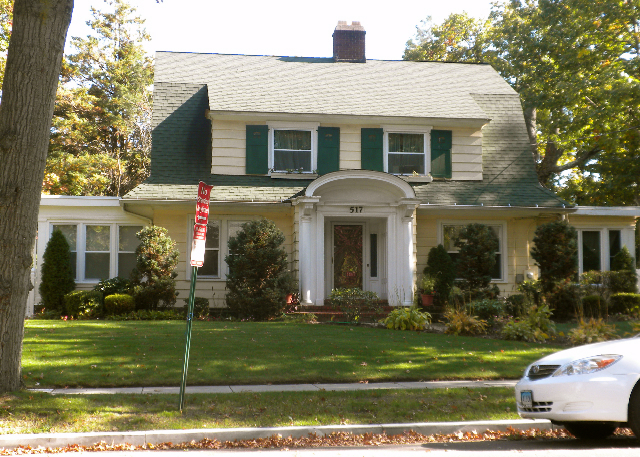
Dutch Colonial, 517 Ellsworth Avenue (1920), Brown & von Beren.

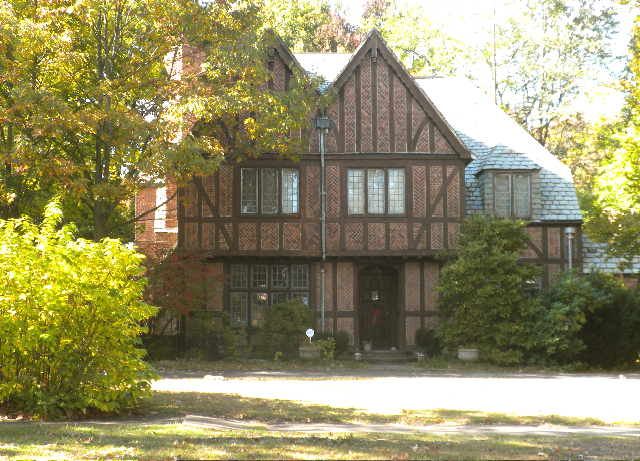
636 Ellsworth Avenue (1938), Lewis Bowman, Bronxville.

== See also ==
- National Register of Historic Places listings in New Haven County, Connecticut
