= Fairlawn–Nettleton Historic District =

Coordinates: 41.322°N 72.951°W

Fairlawn–Nettleton Historic District is a state-designated historic district in New Haven, Connecticut.

It is located in the Beaver Hills neighborhood of New Haven. The street boundaries are Goffe Terrace on the northeast, Osborn Avenue on the northwest, Whalley Avenue on the southwest, and Ella T. Grasso Boulevard on the southeast.

== See also ==
- Redfield & West Streets Historic District and Elm Street Historic District, other state historic districts in New Haven that are not listed on the National Register of Historic Places
