= Howard Avenue Historic District =

Historic district in Connecticut, United States

- U.S. National Register of Historic Places
- U.S. Historic district
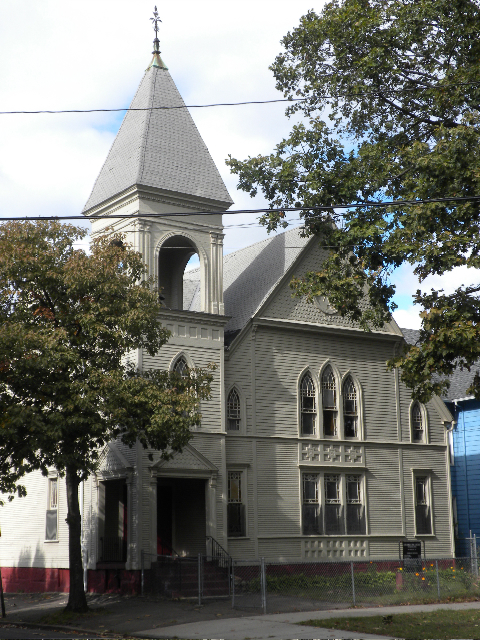
- Howard Avenue Methodist Church, now New Light Holy Church, 198 Howard Avenue (1875-1890), Luzerne I. Thomas, architect.

- Location within Connecticut Location within the United States
- Location: Properties along Howard Avenue between Interstate 95 and Washington Avenue, New Haven, Connecticut
- Coordinates: 41°17′31.7″N 72°55′57.4″W
- Area: 32 acres (13 ha)
- Built: 1880
- Architect: Multiple
- Architectural style: Colonial Revival, Late Victorian, Queen Anne
- NRHP reference No.: 85002308
- Added to NRHP: September 12, 1985

The Howard Avenue Historic District is a 32-acre (13 ha) historic district in The Hill neighborhood of the city of New Haven, Connecticut. Extending along Howard Avenue between Minor Street and Interstate 95, it contains an unusually high concentration of well-preserved late 19th-century middle class vernacular architecture, reflecting the area's growth at that time. It was listed on the National Register of Historic Places in 1985.

== Description and history ==
According to city maps and records, Howard Avenue was probably laid out in the 1640s. It was largely surrounded by farmland, and in the early 19th century it was given its present wide boulevard appearance, as part of an attempt by developer James Hillhouse to spur residential development. His attempt failed, and it was not until the 1860s, when a horsecar railway was run along the northern section, that serious development began. This development was further spurred by the creation of a large railyard just to its east by the New York, New Haven & Hartford Railroad, which drew workers to the area. In the early 20th-century, middle-class workers began to move further out into streetcar suburbs.

When listed in 1985, the district included 151 buildings deemed to contribute to the historic character of the area. It includes properties fronting Howard Avenue from Minor Street (just south of Washington Avenue) to Fifth Street (just North of Interstate 95). The portion from Lambertion Street to Fifth Street is also in City Point (which today is considered a section of The Hill). Most of the buildings are residential, with wood-frame single-family houses predominating. There are a few brick buildings, as well as a school and firehouse that date to later in the 20th century. The scale of these later additions is of a comparable scale. The houses are architecturally a cross-section of styles dating from the 1860s to the 1910s, typically in vernacular forms with modest adornment. There have been relatively few unsympathetic modifications; these are often limited to the application of modern siding.

== Gallery ==
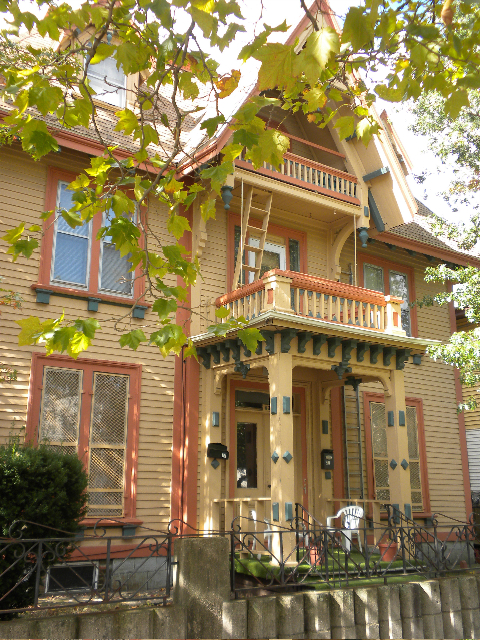
Nicholas Countryman House, 622 Howard Avenue (1866), Rufus G. Russell, with early influence of Gothic Stick style.

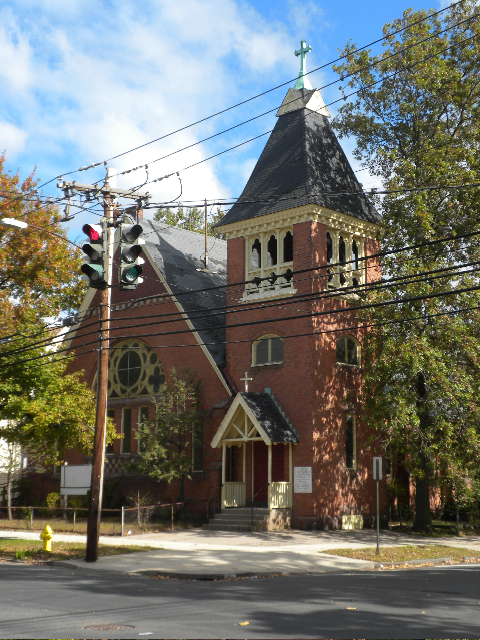
Episcopal Church of the Ascension, 33 Lamberton Street (1887), Leoni Robinson.

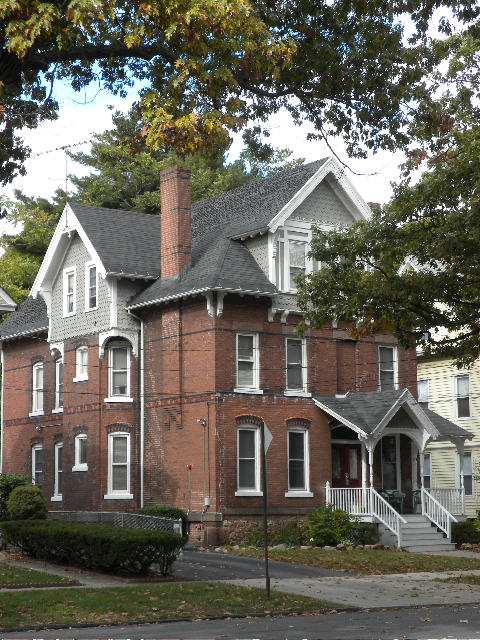
164 Howard Avenue (1885).

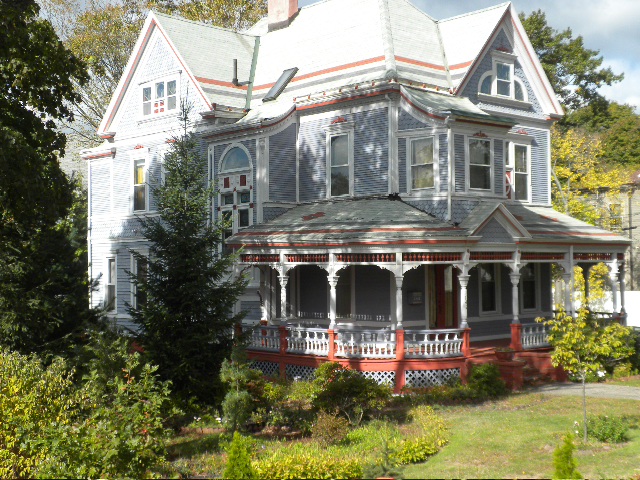
142 Howard Avenue (about 1900).

== See also ==
- National Register of Historic Places listings in New Haven, Connecticut
