= Trowbridge Square Historic District =

Historic district in Connecticut, United States

- U.S. National Register of Historic Places
- U.S. Historic district
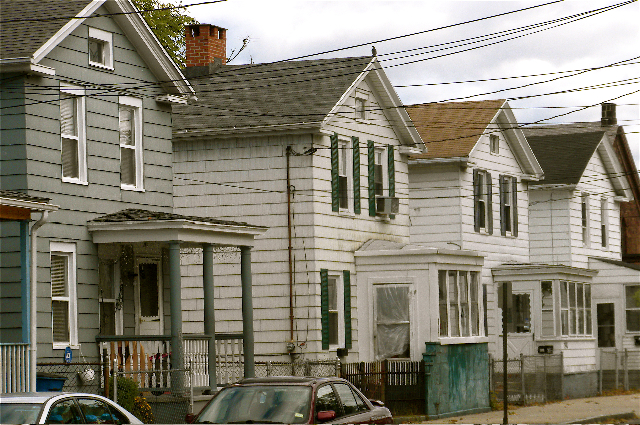
- Houses north side of Trowbridge Square (1860s).

- Location within Connecticut Location within the United States
- Location: Roughly bounded by Columbus & Howard Avenues, New Haven, Connecticut
- Coordinates: 41°17′47″N 72°55′55″W
- Area: 26 acres (11 ha)
- Built: 1830
- Architect: Thompson, Isaac; Multiple
- Architectural style: Greek Revival, Italianate, Queen Anne
- NRHP reference No.: 85002311
- Added to NRHP: September 12, 1985

Trowbridge Square Historic District, originally known as Village of Spireworth and Mount Pleasant, is a well-preserved 19th-century neighborhood in the Hill section of New Haven, Connecticut. Roughly bounded by Columbus, Howard, and Union Avenues, and Church Street on the East, the area was laid out in 1830 and developed as a working-class neighborhood. It retains its historic streetscape, and many original buildings, representing modest versions of a diversity of mid-to-late 19th century styles. The district was listed on the National Register of Historic Places in 1985.

== Description and history ==
The Trowbridge Square Historic District is centered on a Trowbridge Square, a small square park located southwest of downtown New Haven and northwest of the city's historic working port areas. The surrounding streets were laid out in apparent emulation of the nine-square plan by which New Haven was platted in the 17th century. These streets are mostly lined with modest 1-1/2 and 2-1/2 story frame houses, set close to the street, with vernacular touches of architectural styles dating from about 1830 to the turn of the 20th century. The principal non-residential structures in the area are those of the Sacred Heart church, school, and convent, which date to the same period.

The Trowbridge Square area was little more than a shanty town in the early 19th century, adjacent to docks and tanneries to the south. James Hillhouse, a local landowner, contemplated development of the area in the 1810s, but economic depression held these plans back. The idea was picked up in 1830 by Simeon Jocelyn and Isaac Thompson, who purchased the land, laid out the street grid, and dubbed the new development "Spireworth". Jocelyn, a successful businessman and real estate developer, sought to create "a harmonious community in which the city's poor and disadvantaged, a high proportion of whom were blacks, could achieve spiritual, moral and (hopefully) economic betterment." Development remained slow until the 1850s, when Thomas Trowbridge funded improvements to the park (including its fence) and spearheaded construction of the church. Trowbridge also developed many of the small worker cottages in the district, which were primarily rented out to laborers. He built more elaborate and larger Italianate houses in the Cedar Street area.

== Gallery ==
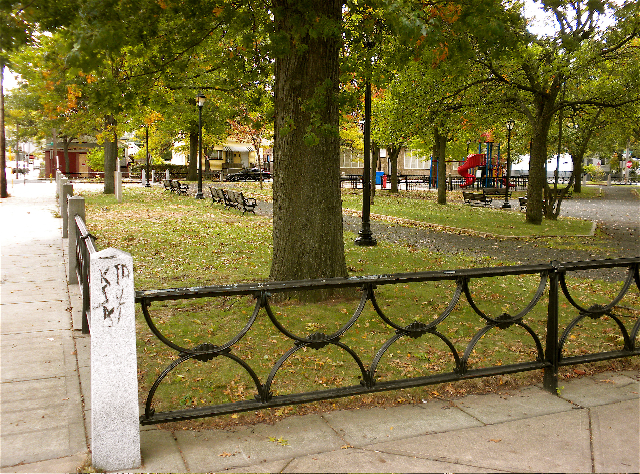
Trowbridge Square towards the South Side

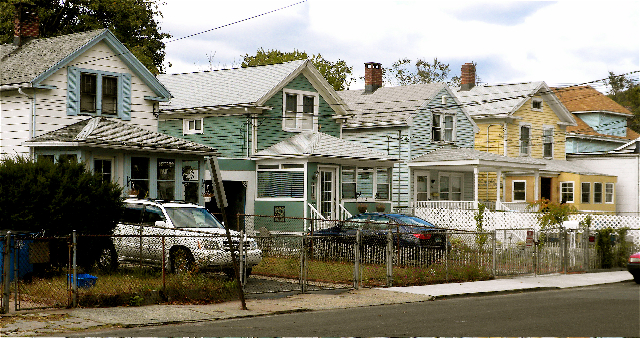
Houses West Side of Trowbridge Square (1870s)

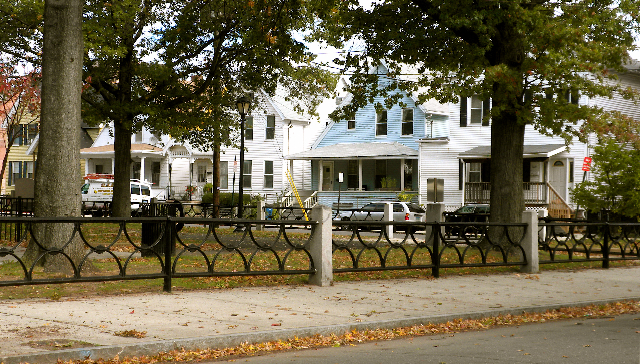
Trowbridge Square towards the East Side (1880s)

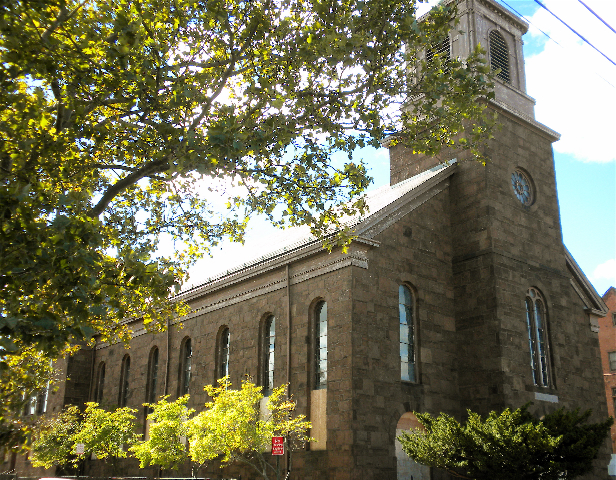
South Congregational Church, Liberty Street and Columbus Avenue (1851), Sidney Mason Stone. (Sacred Heart Church from 1875)

== See also ==
- National Register of Historic Places listings in New Haven, Connecticut
