= Betsy Ross Arts Magnet School =

Middle and High School in New Haven, Connecticut

Coordinates: 41.2883°N 72.9340°W

Betsy Ross Arts and Design Academy

Location
- 150 Kimberly Avenue; New Haven, Connecticut; United States

Information
- Former name: Betsy Ross Arts Magnet School
- School type: Magnet school
- NCES District ID: 0902790
- NCES School ID: 090279000545
- Teaching staff: 35 FTE
- Grades: 5-10
- Enrollment: 334 (2023-2024)
- Student to teacher ratio: 9.54

Betsy Ross Arts and Design Academy (BRADA) is an interdistrict middle and high school located at 150 Kimberly Avenue, New Haven, Connecticut, with a focus on the arts.

Students are offered an array of art subjects including music, visual art, dance and theater along with additional disciplines within each subject. While students do partake in arts classes during each school day, academic programs are also an important focus. Betsy Ross has many connections within the New Haven County community including the Quinnipiac University College Scholars Program and a residency with Shubert Theatre (New Haven).

== History ==
- In 1998, the collaboration of sixth grade Betsy Ross dancers and the Pilobolus Dance Theater was featured in the New York Times.
- In 2000, Betsy Ross was one of three schools in Connecticut to participate as an affiliate in the New York Times Learning Network.
- For the 2025-2026 school year, Betsy Ross added 9th grade with plans to add one grade a year up to 12th grade.
- For the 2026-2027 school year, Betsy Ross added 10th grade.
