= Upper State Street Historic District =

Historic district in Connecticut, United States

- U.S. National Register of Historic Places
- U.S. Historic district
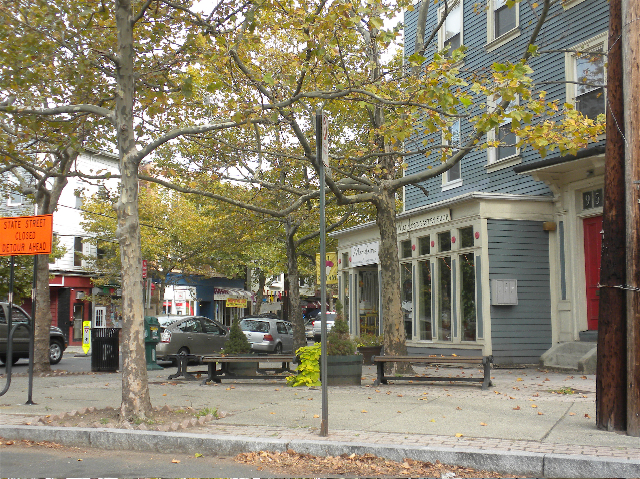
- Upper State Street at Beech Street

- Location within Connecticut Location within the United States
- Location: Roughly State Street from Bradley Street to Mill River Street, New Haven, Connecticut
- Coordinates: 41°18′53″N 72°54′41″W
- Area: 23 acres (9.3 ha)
- Architectural style: Late 19th and 20th Century Revivals, Late Victorian, Greek Revival
- NRHP reference No.: 84001143
- Added to NRHP: September 7, 1984

The Upper State Street Historic District encompasses a well-preserved neighborhood commercial district of the late 19th century in the East Rock neighborhood of New Haven, Connecticut. The district is an irregular strip running NNE to SSW mainly along State Street in New Haven (between Bradley Street and the Mill River), one block west of Interstate 91, the highway which determines the district's eastern and southern borders. The district was listed on the U.S. National Register of Historic Places in 1984.

When New Haven's core area was laid out in the 1630s, what is now State Street started out as a path from that area to a series of meadows along the Mill River that were used as pasture land. A bridge spanned the Mill River in 1641, cementing the roadway's importance as an east–west travel route. It saw no significant commercial development, however, until after 1850, when the rapidly industrializing city began expanding into the area. By the 1890s the street had been almost fully developed as a neighborhood commercial center, serving the large residential area traversed by Orange Street and Whitney Avenue to the west.

Most of the buildings lining State Street date to this first period of development. They are architecturally and functionally diverse, including commercial buildings, mixed-use commercial/residential buildings, light industrial buildings, and churches. Many of the commercial buildings have retained original features of their storefronts. Only a small number of buildings from that period have been demolished, and the surrounding streetscape suffered from the construction of Interstate 91 in the mid-20th century.

== Gallery ==
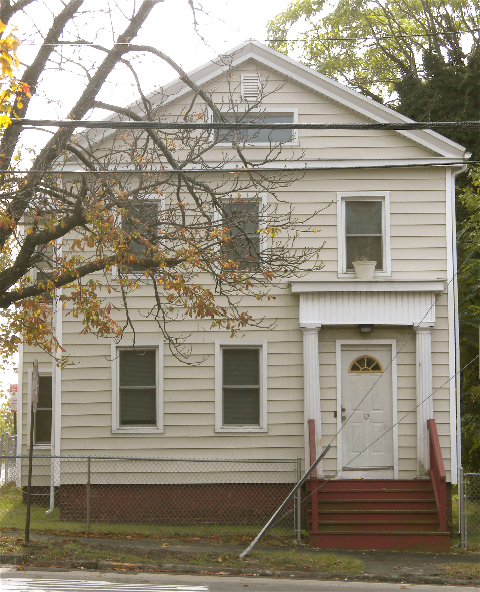
32 Walnut Street (about 1837), Franklin (now Jocelyn) Square.

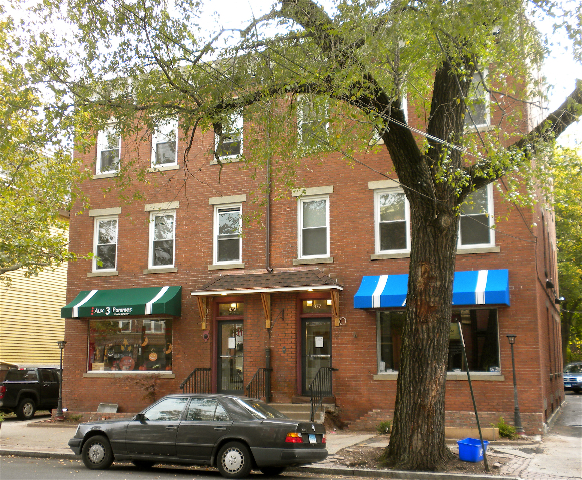
977-9 State Street.

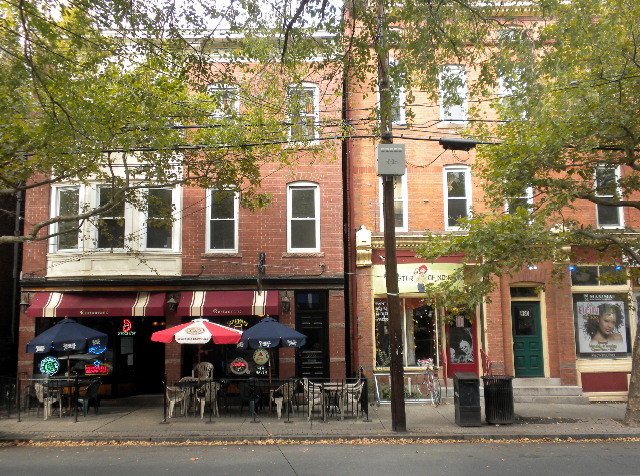
974-6 and 980 State Street.

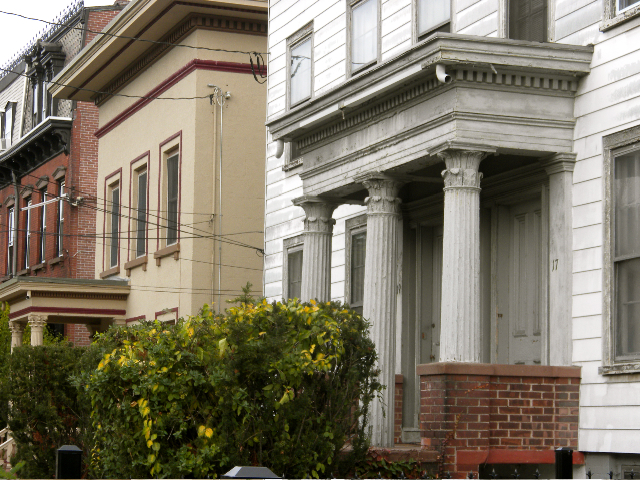
Eld Street West of State Street.

== See also ==
- National Register of Historic Places listings in New Haven, Connecticut
