= List of New York Public Library branches =

The New York Public Library system includes libraries in Manhattan, the Bronx, and Staten Island. This page is organized by borough, and alphabetically. The boroughs of Brooklyn and Queens are supported by their own separate library systems.

== Research libraries ==
	Library	Image	Address	Historical Note
1	Stephen A. Schwarzman Building (Main Branch)		Fifth Avenue at 42nd Street	Built after the New York Public Library was formed as a combination of two libraries in the late 1890s. The architectural firm Carrère and Hastings constructed the structure in the Beaux-Arts style, and the structure opened on May 23, 1911. The building was declared a National Historic Landmark, a National Register of Historic Places site, and a New York City designated landmark.
2	Library for the Performing Arts (Dorothy and Lewis B. Cullman Center)		40 Lincoln Center Plaza	Opened in 1965, it houses one of the world's largest collections of materials relating to the performing arts.
3	Schomburg Center for Research in Black Culture		515 Malcolm X Boulevard	Designed by McKim, Mead & White and opened in 1905.

== Libraries in Manhattan ==
	Library	Image	Address	Historical Note
5	53rd Street Library		18 West 53rd Street	The 53rd Street branch opened on June 27, 2016.
6	115th Street Library		203 West 115th Street	Designed by McKim, Mead & White and opened in 1907
7	125th Street Library		224 East 125th Street	Designed by McKim, Mead & White and opened in 1904.
8	58th Street Library		127 East 58th Street	Originally designed by Carrère & Hastings and opened May 10, 1907. The original building was demolished and replaced by a new branch in two floors of an office tower at 127 East 58th Street, which opened in 1969.
9	67th Street Library		328 East 67th Street	Designed by the firm Babb, Cook, & Willard; and was constructed with funds provided by Andrew Carnegie; built to resemble the Yorkville Branch of the library; renovated in the 1950s, and then again in 2005
10	96th Street Library		112 East 96th Street	Designed by Babb, Cook, & Willard and opened in 1905; constructed with funds provided by Andrew Carnegie.
11	Aguilar Library		174 East 110th Street	Originally named the Aguilar Free Library Society in 1896, for Grace Aguilar, a Sephardic Jewish author; merged with the NYPL in 1905 and moved into a new location that was built using Carnegie funds. The Library is known for its large collection of Spanish titles.
12	Andrew Heiskell Braille and Talking Book Library		40 West 20th Street	
13	Battery Park City Library	NYPL Murray St BPC evacuation drill jeh	175 North End Avenue	Designed by 1100 Architect in 2010.
14	Bloomingdale Library	NYFCL Bloomingdale Branch	150 West 100th Street	Opened in 1898 as the Bloomingdale Branch of the New York Free Circulating Library; merged with the New York Public Library in 1901; rebuilt one block east in 1961.
15	Chatham Square Library		33 East Broadway	Opened in 1903 as a branch of the New York Free Circulating Library; rebuilt in 1911 with funds contributed by Andrew Carnegie; one of the busiest branches of the NYPL.
16	Columbus Library		742 10th Avenue	First opened in 1909 and was built using funds contributed by Andrew Carnegie; Columbus Library received major collections from the reading room of the Columbus Catholic club; operated on one floor from the 1970s until 2004, until more rooms were incorporated after a 2005 remodel.
17	Countee Cullen Library		104 West 136th Street	Opened on January 14, 1905, originally named the 135th Street Branch; built using funds contributed by Andrew Carnegie; original building is now part of the Schomburg Center for Research in Black Culture; named for the poet and teacher Countee Cullen, who plays a role in the Harlem Renaissance, in 1951.
18	Donnell Library Center	NYPL-Donnell	20 West 53rd Street	Opened in 1955, and closed in 2008; had a large reference and circulating collection.
19	Epiphany Library		228 East 23rd Street	
20	Fort Washington Library		535 West 179th Street	
21	George Bruce Library	NYFCL George Bruce Branch	518 West 125th Street	
22	Grand Central Library		135 East 46th Street	
23	Hamilton Fish Park Library		415 East Houston Street	
24	Hamilton Grange Library		503 West 145th Street	
25	Harlem Library		9 West 124th Street	
26	Hudson Park Library		66 Leroy Street	
27	Inwood Library		4790 Broadway	
28	Jefferson Market Library	Jefferson Market Library	425 Avenue of the Americas	
29	Kips Bay Library	Kips Bay NYPL jeh	446 Third Avenue	Opened in 1972 as a replacement for the St. Gabriel's and Nathan Straus branches, which had been torn down to make way for construction of the Queens–Midtown Tunnel and Kips Bay Towers, respectively.
30	Macomb's Bridge Library		2633 Adam Clayton Powell, Jr. Boulevard	The branch opened in 1955 at 2650 Adam Clayton Powell Jr. Boulevard, inside the Harlem River Houses, and was the smallest NYPL branch at 685 square feet (63.6 m^{2}). In January 2020, the branch moved across the street to a larger space.
31	Mid-Manhattan Library	Mid-Manhattan Library	455 Fifth Avenue	Opened in 1970 to replace the circulating division at the Schwarzman Building. Renovated from 2017 to 2020.
32	Morningside Heights Library	Morningside NYPL Bwy 113 jeh	2900 Broadway	
33	Muhlenberg Library		209 West 23rd Street	Carnegie gift, Reopened in 2025.
34	Mulberry Street Library		10 Jersey Street	
35	New Amsterdam Library		9 Murray Street	
36	Ottendorfer Library	Freie Bibliothek and Deutsches Dispensary	135 Second Avenue	
37	Riverside Library		127 Amsterdam Avenue	
38	Roosevelt Island Library		524 Main Street 40.7608°N 73.9507°W	Opened In 1979 after being located in the Herman and Dorothy Reade apartment, then a community room, for three years.
39	Seward Park Library		192 East Broadway	Originally a branch of the Aguilar Free Library Society, and was initially built in 1886; the branch that stands today was built with Carnegie funds and opened in 1909.
40	St. Agnes Library		444 Amsterdam Avenue	
41	Terence Cardinal Cooke–Cathedral Library		560 Lexington Avenue 40.7567°N 73.9724°E	
42	Tompkins Square Library		331 East 10th Street	
43	Washington Heights Library		1000 St. Nicholas Avenue	
44	Webster Library		1465 York Avenue	Originally part of the Webster Free Library, founded by the East Side House settlement in 1894; absorbed by the NYPL in 1904, and it was set for a new library to be built with funds from Andrew Carnegie's gift to the city.
45	Yorkville Library		222 East 79th Street	Opened in 1902 as the first library built with Carnegie funds; designed by James Brown Lord.

== Libraries in the Bronx ==
	Library	Image	Address	Historical Note
46	Allerton Library		2740 Barnes Avenue	Opened in 1960, designed by Hertz and Salerni in conjunction with Department of Public Works.
47	Baychester Library	NYPL Bronx Baychester Library Co-op City	2049 Asch Loop North	First opened in 1973, and remodeled in 2003.
48	Belmont Library and Enrico Fermi Cultural Center		610 East 186th Street	
49	Bronx Library Center	Bronx Library Center	310 East Kingsbridge Road	
50	Castle Hill Library		947 Castle Hill Avenue	
51	City Island Library	City Island Library	320 City Island Avenue	
52	Clason's Point Library		1215 Morrison Avenue	Designed by John J. O'Malley.
53	Eastchester Library		1385 East Gun Hill Road	
54	Edenwald Library	Edenwald Library	1255 East 233rd Street	
55	Fordham Branch (Bronx Reference Center)		2556 Bainbridge Avenue	The original branch was a Carnegie branch designed by McKim, Mead & White. It operated as a standalone building from 1923 to 2005.
55	Francis Martin Library	Francis W. Martin Library	2150 University Avenue	Named after Francis W. Martin, the first district attorney of the Bronx.
56	Grand Concourse Library	Grand Concourse Library	155 East 173rd Street 40°50′38″N 73°54′36″W	
57	High Bridge Library		78 West 168th Street	
58	Hunt's Point Library	Hunt's Point Library	877 Southern Boulevard	
59	Jerome Park Library	Jerome Park Library	118 Eames Place	
60	Kingsbridge Library	Kingsbridge Library	291 West 231st Street	
61	Melrose Library	Melrose Bx NYPL 910 Morris Av jeh	910 Morris Avenue	Opened in 1914 as the first free circulating collection of books in the South Bronx using a portion of Andrew Carnegie's gift to the city; the building was designed by the Carrere and Hastings.
62	Morris Park Library	Morris Park Library	985 Morris Park Avenue	
63	Morrisania Library	Morrisania Library	610 East 169th Street	
64	Mosholu Library	Mosholu Library	285 East 205th Street	Opened in 1954.
65	Mott Haven Library	Mott Haven Library	321 East 140th Street	
66	Parkchester Library	Parkchester Library	1985 Westchester Avenue	
67	Pelham Bay Library	Pelham Bay Library	3060 Middletown Road	
68	Pelham Parkway–Van Nest Library	Pelham Bay Library	2147 Barnes Avenue	"The history of the branch goes back to 1912, when it was first established as a station of NYPL's Travelling Libraries program, bringing library books to neighborhoods that didn't yet have branches. The Van Nest sub-branch opened in 1917, and occupied a series of small, but progressively larger storefront locations around the neighborhood, until it moved to its current location in 1968." After years of "clamoring" and "an unprecedented amount of support" for the renaming of the branch, the Van Nest Library was renamed Pelham Parkway-Van Nest on August 27, 2014.
69	Riverdale Library		5540 Mosholu Avenue	
70	Sedgwick Library		1701 Martin Luther King, Jr. Boulevard	
71	Soundview Library	Soundview Library	660 Soundview Avenue	
72	Spuyten Duyvil Library	Spuyten Duyvil Library	650 West 235th Street	
73	Throg's Neck Library		3025 Cross Bronx Expressway Extension	
74	Tremont Library	Tremont Library	1866 Washington Avenue	
75	Van Cortlandt Library	Van Cortlandt Library	3874 Sedgwick Avenue	
76	Wakefield Library	Wakefield Library	4100 Lowerre Place	
77	West Farms Library		2085 Honeywell Avenue	
78	Westchester Square Library	Westchester Square Library	2521 Glebe Avenue	
79	Woodlawn Heights Library	Woodlawn Heights Library	4355 Katonah Avenue	
80	Woodstock Library	Woodstock	761 East 160th Street	Two-story Carnegie library building opened in 1914. Contains children's, young adult, and adult collections at ground level and a multipurpose room on the second floor.

== Libraries in Staten Island ==
	Library	Image	Address	Historical Note
81	Dongan Hills Library; 40.5904°N 74.101°W		1617 Richmond Road	The branch started operating out of a location on Richmond Road in 1957 and moved to its current one-story location in 1975. The building was refurbished in 2008.
82	Great Kills Library	Great Kills NYPL jeh	56 Giffords Lane	The Great Kills branch was opened in 1927 as a one-story building and was replaced by the current three-story building in the 1950s. Fully renovated in 2005, it currently has a lower level for community events, a first floor for adult collections, and a second floor for children's collections.
83	Huguenot Park Library		830 Huguenot Avenue	The branch opened in January 1985, replacing what was once the smallest New York Public Library building just east of the station (still standing). The Huguenot Park branch was possibly named in honor of the nearby Staten Island Railway Huguenot Station's former name. They anticipatd a new location in the summer of 2026, opening at Rossville.
84	Mariners Harbor Library		206 South Avenue 40°38′5″N 74°9′59″W	Opened on December 16, 2013 in single-story building on a 16,000-square foot plot, the Mariners Harbor Library is located amidst the rich maritime heritage of Staten Island's Mariners Harbor neighborhood. It is the thirteenth branch of The New York Public Library on Staten Island and serves roughly 30,000 people.
85	New Dorp Library		309 New Dorp Lane	First opened in 1907, then moved several times. In 1910, the branch moved to a real estate office owned by a local resident, in 1920 the community provided and maintained the library building, then in 1926, the library became part of the NYPL system. Finally, the branch moved to a store building, renamed the "James Watson Hughes Memorial Library", in 1928.
86	Port Richmond Library		75 Bennett Street	Interest in a library began in 1833, and various private library groups operated during the 19th century. The Port Richmond branch's current Carnegie library structure was built in 1905, becoming Port Richmond's permanent library. The Chimes Playhouse auditorium was constructed in 1939, and the Children's Room was rehabilitated in 2008.
87	Richmondtown Library	Richmondtown NYPL jeh	200 Clarke Avenue	The Richmondtown branch opened in 1996 and contains two floors: a first floor for adults and a second floor for children.
88	South Beach Library	South Beach NYPL jeh	21-25 Robin Road	The South Beach branch started operating out of a location on Sand Lane in the mid-20th century, but was destroyed in a 1989 fire. The South Beach branch reopened in 1990 and moved to its current one-story, 3,000-square-foot (280 m^{2}) location on Robin Road in 2000.
89	St. George Library Center		5 Central Avenue	Opened June 1907, designed by Carrère and Hastings and built using Carnegie funds.
90	Stapleton Library		132 Canal Street	The Carrere & Hastings-designed Carnegie library was built in 1907. It underwent significant renovations and remodeling from 2011 to 2013, including the addition of a 7,600-square-foot (710 m^{2}) building. A minor controversy arose over the discrepancy of architectural styles between the modernist black-glass addition and the original structure.
91	Todt Hill–Westerleigh Library		2550 Victory Boulevard 40.6096°N 74.1487°W	The three-story branch opened in 1991.
92	Tottenville Library		7430 Amboy Road	The one-story Carnegie library building was designed by Carrère and Hastings and opened in 1904. It is a New York City designated landmark.
93	West New Brighton Library		976 Castleton Avenue	When the branch opened in 1913, it was a sub-branch of the NYPL. The West New Brighton moved to a second location in 1918, and then to its present site in 1933.

== See also ==
- List of Brooklyn Public Library branches
- List of Carnegie libraries in New York City
- List of Queens Library branches
- List of libraries in the United States
