= List of Carnegie libraries in New York City =

List of libraries in New York City endowed by the Carnegie Corporation

The following list of Carnegie libraries in New York City provides detailed information on United States Carnegie libraries in New York City, where 67 libraries were built with funds from one grant totaling $5,202,261 (worth some $201 million today), awarded by the Carnegie Corporation of New York on December 8, 1899. Although the original grant was negotiated in 1899, most of the grant money was awarded as the libraries were built between 1901 and 1923. Carnegie libraries were built in all 5 boroughs.

== Key ==
Building still operating as a library
Building standing, but now serving another purpose
Building no longer standing
Building listed on the National Register of Historic Places (including buildings that are also New York City designated landmarks) Building is a New York City designated landmark but not on the National Register of Historic Places

== Carnegie libraries in Manhattan, the Bronx, and Staten Island ==
In Manhattan, the Bronx, and Staten Island, 39 libraries were built and became part of the New York Public Library.

=== Carnegie libraries in Manhattan ===
	Library	Image	Location	Notes
1	115th Street		203 W. 115th St. 40°48′10″N 73°57′14″W	Designed by McKim, Mead & White and opened in 1908.
2	125th Street		224 E. 125th St. 40°48′10.89″N 73°56′5.52″W	Designed by McKim, Mead & White and opened in 1904.
3	135th Street		103 W. 135th St. 40°48′52.31″N 73°56′28.98″W	Designed by McKim, Mead & White and opened in 1905. Now part of the Schomburg Center for Research in Black Culture, a research center of The New York Public Library.
4	58th Street		121-7 East 58th Street	Designed by Carrère & Hastings and opened May 10, 1907. It was demolished and replaced by a new branch in two floors of an office tower at 127 East 58th Street, which opened in 1969.
5	67th Street		328 E. 67th St. 40°45′53.69″N 73°57′34.29″W	Designed by Babb, Cook & Willard in the style of the Yorkville branch and opened in 1905, this building has undergone two extensive renovations in the 1950s and 2005.
6	96th Street		112 E. 96th St. 40°47′9.57″N 73°57′6.34″W	Designed by Babb, Cook & Willard and opened on September 22, 1905.
7	Aguilar		174 E. 110th St. 40°47′39.11″N 73°56′36.32″W	Designed by Herts & Tallant, this building opened as a branch of The New York Public Library in November 1905. "This library is apparently not an entirely new building but is rather an extensive renovation of the earlier [1899] Aguilar Library building on the same site."
8	Chatham Square		33 E. Broadway; 40°42′48.25″N 73°59′47.44″W	Designed by McKim, Mead & White and opened in 1903.
9	Columbus		742 10th Ave. 40°45′53.85″N 73°59′28.53″W	Designed by Babb, Cook & Willard and opened in 1909.
10	Epiphany		228 E. 23rd St. 40°44′17.18″N 73°58′55.06″W	Designed by Carrère & Hastings and opened in September 1907.
11	Fort Washington		535 W. 179th St. 40°50′52.12″N 73°56′2.41″W	Designed by Cook & Welch and opened in April 1914.
12	Hamilton Fish		388-92 East Houston Street	Designed by Carrère & Hastings and opened in 1909, the building was razed during the widening of Houston Street. The road and a small park now stands at its original site. A new Hamilton Fish Park Branch opened at 415 East Houston Street in 1960.
13	Hamilton Grange		503 W. 145th St. 40°49′32.2″N 73°56′53.04″W	Designed by McKim, Mead & White and opened in 1907.
14	Harlem		9 W. 124th St. 40°48′22.29″N 73°56′35.86″W	Designed by McKim, Mead & White and opened in 1909, this building was renovated in 2004 at a cost of nearly $4 million.
15	Hudson Park		66 Leroy St. 40°43′47.95″N 74°0′18.57″W	Designed by Carrère & Hastings and opened in 1906.
16	Muhlenberg		209 W. 23rd St. 40°44′40.02″N 73°59′45.61″W	Designed by Carrère & Hastings, this branch opened February 19, 1906.
17	Riverside		190 Amsterdam Ave. 40°46′35.9″N 73°59′1.04″W	Designed by Carrère & Hastings and opened in 1905, this building stood until 1969, when it was replaced by a new one on the same 69th St site. That branch was replaced by another in 1992, at 127 Amsterdam Ave & 65th St.
18	Rivington Street		61 Rivington St. 40°43′15.15″N 73°59′24.84″W	Designed by McKim, Mead & White and opened in 1905, the building was then taken over by a church several decades after. In 2021, the building was renovated into condos, preserving the original facade.
19	Saint Agnes		444 Amsterdam Ave. 40°47′5.44″N 73°58′38.96″W	Designed by Babb, Cook & Willard, this branch opened in 1906.
20	Saint Gabriel's Park		303-5 East 36th Street	Designed by McKim, Mead & White and opened in 1908, across from St. Gabriel's Park. Razed in order to construct the Queens–Midtown Tunnel.
21	Seward Park		192 E. Broadway; 40°42′52.08″N 73°59′18.68″W	Designed by Babb, Cook & Willard, this branch opened on November 11, 1909.
22	Tompkins Square		331 E. 10th St. 40°43′38.39″N 73°58′49.5″W	Designed by McKim, Mead & White, this branch opened in 1904.
23	Washington Heights		1000 St. Nicholas Ave. 40°50′4.26″N 73°56′22.81″W	Designed by Carrère & Hastings, this branch opened in 1914.
24	Webster		1465 York Ave. 40°46′14.27″N 73°57′4.6″W	This Babb, Cook & Willard work opened on October 24, 1906.
25	West 40th Street		457 West 40th Street	Designed by Cook & Welch, the structure was a Classical Revival limestone building that first opened in 1915. It became part of the Covenant House complex. Covenant House is now redeveloping the site into affordable housing and a new international headquarters. The building was demolished in 2020. Covenant House is pursuing the option of storage, and re-installation of the first-floor and basement facade of the Carnegie Library.
26	Yorkville		222 E. 79th St. 40°46′25.15″N 73°57′22.72″W	Designed by James Brown Lord, this branch opened December 13, 1902, the first Carnegie library built in New York City.

=== Carnegie libraries in Staten Island ===
	Library	Image	Location	Notes
27	Port Richmond		75 Bennett St. 40°38′15.19″N 74°7′52.14″W	Designed by Carrère & Hastings and opened in 1905.
28	Saint George		5 Central Ave. 40°38′30.18″N 74°4′35.94″W	Known today as the St. George Library Center, this Carrère & Hastings work opened on June 26, 1907, and is the largest library on Staten Island.
29	Stapleton		132 Canal St. 40°37′35.25″N 74°4′40.78″W	Designed by Carrère & Hastings and opened in 1907.
30	Tottenville		7430 Amboy Rd. 40°30′34.5″N 74°14′38.79″W	A Carrère & Hastings design, this branch opened in 1904.

=== Carnegie libraries in the Bronx ===
	Library	Image	Location{	Notes
31	Fordham		2556 Bainbridge Ave. 40°51′45.76″N 73°53′34.5″W	Designed by McKim, Mead & White and opened in 1923, this building was the Fordham Library Center, The New York Public Library's central branch in the Bronx, through 2005, when it closed and was replaced by the newly built Bronx Library Center.
32	High Bridge		78 W. 168th St. 40°50′17.48″N 73°55′25.37″W	Designed by Carrère & Hastings and opened in 1908. Demolished in 1975 and replaced by a new High Bridge Branch on the same site.
33	Hunts Point		877 Southern Blvd. 40°49′7.11″N 73°53′38.68″W	Designed by Carrère & Hastings and completed in 1929, this was the final Carnegie building added to the New York Public Library system.
34	Kingsbridge		3041 Kingsbridge Ave. 40°52′44.18″N 73°54′26.79″W	Designed by McKim, Mead & White and opened May 19, 1905. This branch outgrew its original building and closed in 1958. It is now the Spuyten Duyvil Preschool.
35	Melrose		910 Morris Ave. 40°49′35.73″N 73°55′3.42″W	A Carrère & Hastings design, this branch opened January 16, 1914. It was originally four stories but was reduced to two in 1959.
36	Morrisania		610 E. 169th St. 40°49′53″N 73°54′6.16″W	Designed by Babb, Cook & Willard and opened in 1908.
37	Mott Haven		321 E. 140th St. 40°48′41.49″N 73°55′27.42″W	The oldest library building in the Bronx, this branch opened in 1905, designed by Babb, Cook & Willard.
38	Tremont		1866 Washington Ave. 40°50′45.72″N 73°53′54.04″W	Designed by Carrère & Hastings and opened in 1905.
39	Woodstock		761 E. 160th St. 40°49′13.45″N 73°54′19.4″W	Designed by McKim, Mead & White and opened in 1914.

== Carnegie libraries in Brooklyn ==
Brooklyn received $1.6 million ($61.9 million today) of the entire grant to construct 21 libraries for the Brooklyn Public Library.

	Library	Image	Location	Notes
1	Arlington		203 Arlington Ave. at Warwick St. 40°40'50.4"N 73°53'14.0"W	Originally known as the East Branch and officially opened on November 7, 1906; renovated from 1950 to 1952 and in 1980.
2	Bedford		496 Franklin Avenue	This Library plan was recognized as an excellent example of library planning and design in the March 1903 issue of Library Journal. It was built using Carnegie funds. In 2000, an interior renovation and exterior restoration by Sen Architects was completed.
3	Brownsville		61 Glenmore Avenue	The first Brownsville Branch opened in 1905 on the second floor of the Alliance Building after the Hebrew Educational Society donated its books. The Carnegie-built branch, which opened at 61 Glenmore Avenue on December 19, 1908, continues to operate today.
4	Bushwick		340 Bushwick Avenue	Bushwick Library opened in the rented first floor of a church at Montrose Avenue and Humboldt Street in 1903 before moving to its present location on Bushwick Avenue in 1908.
5	Carroll Park [now Carroll Gardens]		396 Clinton Street at Union Street	Designed by William B. Tubby, this location opened at 396 Clinton Street on March 3, 1905, and was originally called the Carroll Park Branch, until the name was changed to Carroll Gardens in 1973. A predecessor library operated out of a rented space at Smith Street and Carroll Streets from 1901 until completion of this building, which still serves the community today.
6	DeKalb		790 Bushwick Avenue	Located on bustling Bushwick Avenue in the neighborhood of the same name, DeKalb Library originally opened its doors on February 11, 1905. The building was designed by the Brooklyn architect William Tubby in the Classical Revival style. Many of the original features in this three-bay brick and limestone building remain today, including its spacious, high-ceilinged reading rooms. The library was rehabilitated in 1950.
7	Eastern Parkway		1044 Eastern Parkway	This medium-sized library, built with funds donated by Andrew Carnegie, was designed with a classical limestone facade with large arched windows and entrance portal.
8	Flatbush		22 Linden Blvd. at Flatbush Ave.	Flatbush Library has served patrons in its present location on Linden Boulevard since 1905; it was the sixth library built in Brooklyn with funds from philanthropist Andrew Carnegie. The building was designed by Rudolphe L. Daus, but an extensive renovation in 1934 has rendered the building almost unrecognizable.
9	Fort Hamilton		9424 Fourth Ave.	This library started out as an independent free library and was absorbed into Brooklyn Public Library in 1901. The building was designed by the Lord & Hewlett architecture firm and formally opened at 9424 Fourth Avenue on October 16, 1907.
10	Greenpoint		107 Norman Ave. 40°43′33″N 73°57′2.6″W	The original Greenpoint Library opened in 1906 and was one of Brooklyn's first Carnegie libraries, but the building's deterioration necessitated its replacement in the early 1970s.
11	Leonard		81 Devoe St. at Leonard St., Williamsburg	The Leonard Branch was officially opened on December 1, 1908, at its current site at Devoe and Leonard Streets. The one-story classically styled building, designed by William B. Tubby, has an elegantly designed interior of 10,000 square feet that originally featured molded skylights, wood paneling and wood-trimmed windows.
12	Macon		361 Lewis Avenue, Bedford-Stuyversant	The 11th Carnegie Brooklyn library, beautiful, historic Macon Library is one of the best preserved Carnegie branches in Brooklyn. Opened in 1907, the two-story, Classical Revival-style building retains its original fireplaces, oak paneling, alcoves and wooden benches, along with the warm charm that has welcomed patrons for more than 100 years.
13	Pacific		25 4th Avenue at Pacific Street	The Pacific Branch was the first of the Carnegie-funded libraries to open in Brooklyn, on October 8, 1904. Architect Raymond F. Almirall designed the building, at 25 Fourth Avenue, and was hired again as architect after the building suffered structural damages due to BMT subway construction in 1914. Upon its opening, New York Tribune praised the branch for its classical and dignified design.
14	Prospect [now Park Slope]		431 6th Ave. at 9th St.	This library began life as a small collection of books on natural history in the Litchfield Mansion in Prospect Park. In 1906, the building, designed by Raymond Almirall was finished, using Carnegie funds.
15	Red Hook			The original Red Hook Library, opened on April 22, 1915, was the only of Brooklyn's Carnegie libraries to be built in the Mediterranean Revival style. The architect, Richard A. Walker, accented the original interior of the building with decorative wooden staircases, pendant light fixtures and clerestory windows. This architectural gem was forced to close in August 1946 after suffering extensive damage from a fire, and was demolished soon after.
16	Saratoga		8 Thomas S Boyland Street 40°41′5.1″N 73°54′54″W	Saratoga Library is a Classical Revival-style Carnegie branch with a distinctive Spanish tile roof and a storied history. Opened in 1908, Saratoga was renovated in 1958, 1974 and 1990.
17	South		51st street and 4th Avenue	South Branch opened to the public on December 9, 1905, on the same site the Sunset Park branch occupies today. The original two-story, Classical Revival-style building, designed by architects Lord & Hewlett, was demolished in 1970.
18	Stone Avenue		581 Mother Gaston Boulevard	Originally constructed to relieve overcrowding at the nearby Brownsville branch, Stone Avenue Library was one of the last Carnegie libraries built in Brooklyn. Officially opened on September 24, 1914, it was originally called the Brownsville Children's Library and is believed to have been the first library in the world devoted exclusively to serving children. Designed by architect William B. Tubby in the Jacobethan style, many of the original architectural details that distinguished the branch as a place for children remain, including the Rookwood storybook fireplace tiles and the original carved wooden benches with rabbit-head finials.
19	Walt Whitman		93 Saint Edwards Street, Ft Greene	Originally called the City Park Branch, this library was renamed to honor Walt Whitman (who once lived on nearby Ryerson Street) in 1943, on the 125th anniversary of his birth. The branch once boasted a naval architecture and science collection, to serve the workers of the Brooklyn Navy Yard.
20	Washington Irving		360 Irving Ave. Bushwick 40°41′51″N 73°54′44″W	Washington Irving Library was the 21st and final Carnegie library built in Brooklyn.
21	Williamsburg		240 Division Avenue 40°42′25″N 73°57′27″W	Although the branch didn't open until 1905, it is often considered the first of Brooklyn's Carnegie libraries. Thousands, including Mayor Seth Low, came out with much fanfare for a ceremony in November 1903, when a time capsule of documents including a copy of the Carnegie contract was laid in the cornerstone of the building at 240 Division Avenue.

== Carnegie libraries in Queens ==
Queens received $240,000 ($9.3 million today) from the grant and built seven libraries for the Queens Public Library.

	Library	Image	Location	Notes
1	Astoria		14-01 Astoria Blvd.	The first Carnegie library completed in Queens. In the 1930s the structure was heavily renovated. Additional renovations took place in the 1960s. $9 million in renovations are planned for 2022–2024.
2	Elmhurst		86-01 Broadway; 40°44′18″N 73°52′38″W	Demolished 2012.
3	Far Rockaway			The third Carnegie library completed in Queens. Destroyed by fire in 1962.
4	Flushing		Kissena Boulevard and Main Street	Demolished in 1955
5	Poppenhusen		121-23 14th Ave. and 13-16 College Point Blvd.	Completed in 1904, it was the second Carnegie library completed in Queens.
6	Richmond Hill		118-14 Hillside Ave.	
7	Woodhaven		85-41 Forest Pkwy.	

== See also ==
- List of New York Public Library Branches
- List of Brooklyn Public Library Branches
- List of Queens Public Library branches
- List of libraries in the United States
