= List of Brooklyn Public Library branches =

The Brooklyn Public Library consists of a Central Library, a Business & Career Library, and 58 neighborhood branches in the New York City borough of Brooklyn. Eighteen libraries are historic Carnegie libraries. The Brooklyn Public Library also has five adult learning centers, as well as a research library called the Center for Brooklyn History.

The Brooklyn Public Library is one of three separate and independent public library systems in New York City. The other two are the New York Public Library (serving the Bronx, Manhattan, and Staten Island), and the Queens Library (serving Queens).

== Libraries ==
Library	Image	Address	Historical notes
Adams Street Library		9 Adams Street	The branch opened on October 12, 2021, and was the first new branch opened in nearly 40 years.
Arlington Library		203 Arlington Avenue	The branch was originally known as the East Branch and officially opened on November 7, 1906; it was renovated from 1950–52 and in 1980.
Bay Ridge Library		7223 Ridge Boulevard	The branch was first organized in 1880 by the Bay Ridge Reading Club, built on its present site in 1896, and became a branch library in 1901. The current two-story facility opened in 1960. In 2004 it received a $2.1 million renovation.
Bedford Library		496 Franklin Avenue	The branch was recognized as an excellent example of library planning and design in the March 1903 issue of Library Journal. It was built using Carnegie funds and opened in 1905. In 2000, an interior renovation and exterior restoration by Sen Architects was completed.
Borough Park Library		1265 43rd Street	
Brighton Beach Library		16 Brighton First Road	The branch opened in December 1949, but due to high patronage, moved to its current location in 1964. The branch was renovated in the early 1990s.
Brooklyn Heights Library		286 Cadman Plaza West	The library opened in its current location in 1962 and was renovated and expanded from 1990 to 1993, along with the adjacent Business & Career Library. In 2017, BPL sold the Brooklyn Heights branch to a developer, who tore the structure down and replaced it with condominiums and a smaller library, which opened in June 2022.
Brower Park Library at Brooklyn Children's Museum	Brower Park Library, a two-story building with an enormous yellow second floor	155 Brooklyn Avenue	The branch was built in 1963 under a plan by mayor Abraham Beame. When it opened, it was northern Brooklyn's first new library in four decades. The original building, located at 725 St. Marks Avenue, was vacated in 2020. Brower Park Library reopened for lobby service in the Brooklyn Children's Museum in 2021. Full service resumed in 2023.
Brownsville Library		61 Glenmore Avenue	The branch opened in 1905 and used a second-floor space of another building, before moving to its current location in 1908. The library is set to close in 2023 for renovations and re-open in 2026.
Bushwick Library		340 Bushwick Avenue	The branch was founded in 1903 and moved to its current building in 1908.
Business & Career Library		280 Cadman Plaza West	Established 1857; current building 1962. In 2017, BPL sold the Brooklyn Heights branch to a developer, who is tearing the structure down and replacing it with condominiums. The Business and Career Library's functions were relocated to BPL's Central Branch.
Canarsie Library		1580 Rockaway Parkway	The branch opened in 1909 with a small circulating connection and became a BPL branch in 1932. Since then, it has relocated twice to accommodate high patronage.
Carroll Gardens Library		396 Clinton Street	The branch was originally the Carroll Park branch and opened in 1901 in a rented facility. The library moved to its current facility, a 14,000-square-foot (1,300 m^{2}) Carnegie library designed by William B. Tubby, in 1905. After extensive renovations, the library received its current name in response to a request from the community.
Center for Brooklyn History		128 Pierrepont Street	The building, constructed in 1881 and designed by George B. Post, housed an organization originally known as the Long Island Historical Society and then the Brooklyn Historical Society. It is a National Historic Landmark. In 2023 it became part of the BPL system.
Central Library		10 Grand Army Plaza	The library started construction in 1912 and was originally envisioned by architect Raymond Almirall called for a domed, four-story Beaux Arts building. Only one wing was built, and in the 1930s, the structure was downsized to a three-story Art Deco building, which was completed in 1940. The second floor opened in 1955. The Central Library was listed on the National Register of Historic Places in 2002.
Clarendon Library		2035 Nostrand Avenue	The branch was founded as a deposit station with a small circulating collection in 1913. The branch moved into its current building in 1954, and it was renovated in 1990.
Clinton Hill Library		380 Washington Avenue	The branch opened in 1973.
Coney Island Library		1901 Mermaid Avenue	The branch opened in 1911 as an unmanned deposit station. Ten years later, it moved to the former Coney Island Times offices and became fully staffed. In 1954 another branch was built. According to BPL's website, the library was referred to as "the first-ever library built on stilts over the Atlantic Ocean." The branch was rebuilt in 2013 after being damaged in Hurricane Sandy.
Cortelyou Library		1305 Cortelyou Road	The branch was first proposed in 1968, but did not open until 1983.
Crown Heights Library	A one-story beige library topped with a large clock	560 New York Avenue	The branch was built in 1958 as part of a plan by mayor Abraham Beame.
Cypress Hills Library		1197 Sutter Avenue	The branch was founded at the Cypress Hills Houses in 1955 and the current building opened in 1995.
DeKalb Library	A tall one-story red brick building stands behind a concrete ramp and black metal fencing. Newly green trees of medium height have grown to the left and right. The sky is blue with some clouds.	790 Bushwick Avenue	Built in the classical revival style with Carnegie funds. The library was rehabilitated in 1950.
Dyker Library		8202 13th Avenue	The one-story structure, opened in 1974, was designed by Daniel Laitin and features a blue-green glazed facade.
East Flatbush Library		9612 Church Avenue	The branch opened in 1945 and temporarily closed for renovations in September 2018.
Eastern Parkway Library	Eastern Parkway Library, a tall single-story building made of light stone	1044 Eastern Parkway	This medium-sized library, built as a Carnegie library, was designed with a classical limestone facade with large arched windows and entrance portal. It is a two-story structure with 12,000 square feet (1,100 m^{2}) of floor space. The branch was renovated at least four times, most recently in 2016.
Flatbush Library		22 Linden Boulevard	The branch was built in 1905 as a Carnegie library.
Flatlands Library		2065 Flatbush Avenue	The branch was opened in a former Prudential Savings Bank branch in 1949, and moved to its current 6,000-square-foot (560 m^{2}) space in 1955.
Fort Hamilton Library		9424 Fourth Avenue	Among the first libraries from philanthropist Andrew Carnegie's $1.6 million gift to build branch libraries in Brooklyn. It opened in 1906, and has gone through numerous renovations. The most recent was completed in March 2011.
Gerritsen Beach Library		2808 Gerritsen Ave. (Bartlett Place)	The branch has been operating since the 1950s, though it moved to its current location, a 10,000-square-foot (930 m^{2}) structure, in 1997. The branch will reopen on December 11, 2025 after a several year renovation.
Gravesend Library		303 Avenue X	The branch opened in 1962 and was renovated in 2001.
Greenpoint Library		107 Norman Avenue	The site originally housed a Carnegie library that opened in 1906. It was replaced twice, first in the 1970s, and again in 2020. The new branch is called the Greenpoint Library & Environmental Education Center.
Highlawn Library		1664 W. 13th St. at Kings Highway	
Homecrest Library		2525 Coney Island Avenue	
Jamaica Bay Library		9727 Seaview Avenue	The branch opened in 1973.
Kensington Library		4207 18th Avenue	The branch was originally created in 1908 as a "deposit station" with a small collection. It had relocated three times by 1912, and moved again in 1960. The current building, completed in 2012, was the first new library built in over 20 years. Designed by Sen Architects, the project was heralded by the Art Commission of the City of New York for its successful integration of green design with other human, urban and architectural aspects.
Kings Bay Library		3650 Nostrand Avenue	The branch opened in 1951, and has occupied its current location since 1959.
Kings Highway Library		2115 Ocean Avenue	The branch was founded in 1910 and initially occupied several storefronts. The Kings Highway branch moved to its current location in 1954, designed by architects Knapp and Johnson and constructed by the Department of Public Works in 1954. It was the first branch library to be erected in Brooklyn by the City of New York. The branch was renovated in 2009 and now contains a reading room in the basement and a passport office.
Leonard Library		81 Devoe Street	The 26,000-square-foot (2,400 m^{2}) library opened in 1908 and was designed by William Tubby.
Library for Arts & Culture		10 Lafayette Avenue, 2nd floor	This small library and event space is part of the L10 Arts and Cultural Center, which opened on January 28, 2025.
Macon Library		361 Lewis Avenue	The Macon Library was the 11th Carnegie Brooklyn library.
Mapleton Library		1702 60th Street	Founded in the 1930s, the Mapleton branch moved to its present building in 1955.
Marcy Library		617 DeKalb Avenue	Formally known as the Tompkins Park Free Library, this branch opened in the center of Tompkins Park on June 6, 1899.
McKinley Park Library		6802 Fort Hamilton Parkway	The branch was originally a deposit station when it opened in 1911. The branch moved to the current 7,425-square-foot (689.8 m^{2}) building in 1959, and the structure was restored in 1995.
Midwood Library		975 East 16th Street	The branch was founded in 1912 and relocated several times before moving to its current location. The branch was rebuilt in the 1950s and again in 1998, and a public plaza was built in 2013.
Mill Basin Library		2385 Ralph Avenue	The branch first opened in 1940, and it has been located in its current building since 1975.
New Lots Library		665 New Lots Avenue	The branch was founded in 1942 and became a BPL branch in 1949.
New Utrecht Library		1743 86th Street	The branch was founded in 1894 as the Free Library of the Town of New Utrecht and became a BPL branch in 1901. The current building opened in 1956.
Pacific Library		25 Fourth Ave. at Pacific St.	The Pacific Branch was the first Carnegie Branch to open to the public in Brooklyn, on October 8, 1904. Designed by Raymond F. Almirall and built by the Church Construction Company, the New York Tribune praised the new branch for its classical and dignified design.
Paerdegat Library		850 E. 59th Street	The branch opened in 1950 and moved to its current building in 1959.
Park Slope Library		431 6th Ave. at 9th St.	This library began life as a small collection of books on natural history in the Litchfield Mansion in Prospect Park. In 1906, the building, designed by Raymond Almirall was finished, using Carnegie funds. It was named the "Prospect branch" before 1975.
Red Hook Library		7 Wolcott Street	The branch was originally housed in a Carnegie library, which was built in 1915 but burned down in a 1946 fire. The branch moved several times before moving to its current location. In March 2023, the branch closed for renovations, and an interim facility opened in July 2024 at 362 Van Brunt Street. The Wolcott Street renovations, originally scheduled for a 2025 completion, are now expected to finish in the first half of 2026.
Rugby Library		1000 Utica Avenue	The branch opened in 1957. It was closed for renovations in mid-2018.
Ryder Library		5902 23rd Ave. (bet. 23rd Ave. at 59th St.)	The branch opened in April 1970 and was designed by Arthur Witthoefft.
Saratoga Library		8 Thomas S. Boyland Street	The branch is a Carnegie library that opened in 1909.
Sheepshead Bay Library	A single-story beige brick building stands beneath a gray sky. A tall person stands facing away from the camera while a second person with crutches is entering the library's front door, near the center of the building.	2636 East 14th Street	The branch has occupied four buildings since it was founded in 1903. The current 7,475-square-foot (694.5 m^{2}) building opened in 1963.
Spring Creek Library		12143 Flatlands Avenue	The single-story, 7,500 square feet (700 m^{2}) structure opened in 1977.
Stone Avenue Library		581 Mother Gaston Boulevard	When the branch opened in 1914 as the Brownsville Children's Library, it was among the world's first children's libraries, as well as one of the last Carnegie libraries in Brooklyn. The branch was renovated in 2014. Stone Avenue was renamed to Mother Gaston Boulevard in 1981, but the library kept its original name.
Sunset Park Library		5108 4th Avenue	The branch was founded in 1905 and was initially located in a two-story Carnegie library designed by Lord and Hewlett. The old library was demolished and rebuilt between 1970 and 1972. A redevelopment of the library site, including a replacement library space, was proposed in 2014 and approved in 2017.
Ulmer Park Library		2602 Bath Avenue; 40.592901°N 73.988609°W	The branch was founded as a subdivision of another library in 1951 before becoming a full-fledged circulation branch in 1956. The current building was opened in 1963 and was renovated in 2016.
Walt Whitman Library		93 Saint Edwards Street	The current Carnegie library structure opened in 1908.
Washington Irving Library		360 Irving Avenue	The branch opened in 1923 and was Brooklyn's final Carnegie library.
Williamsburgh Library	A two-story red brick building partially obscured by a tree on a cloudy day	240 Division Avenue	The original building was designed by Richard A. Walker in classical revival style. It is housed in a 26,000-square-foot (2,400 m^{2}) Carnegie library structure that is one of Brooklyn's largest circulating-library buildings, and is a New York City designated landmark.
Windsor Terrace Library		160 East 5th Street	The branch began as a deposit station with a small collection in 1922, but after 1940, service was intermittent after the library moved to a makeshift structure created out of two old streetcars. In 1969, it moved again into the current library building, which had been completed that year. The branch was renovated in 1994, and again in 2011. It closed for another renovation in February 2019.

== See also ==
- List of Carnegie libraries in New York City
- List of New York Public Library branches
- List of Queens Library branches
- List of libraries in the United States
