= George Fletcher Babb =

American architect

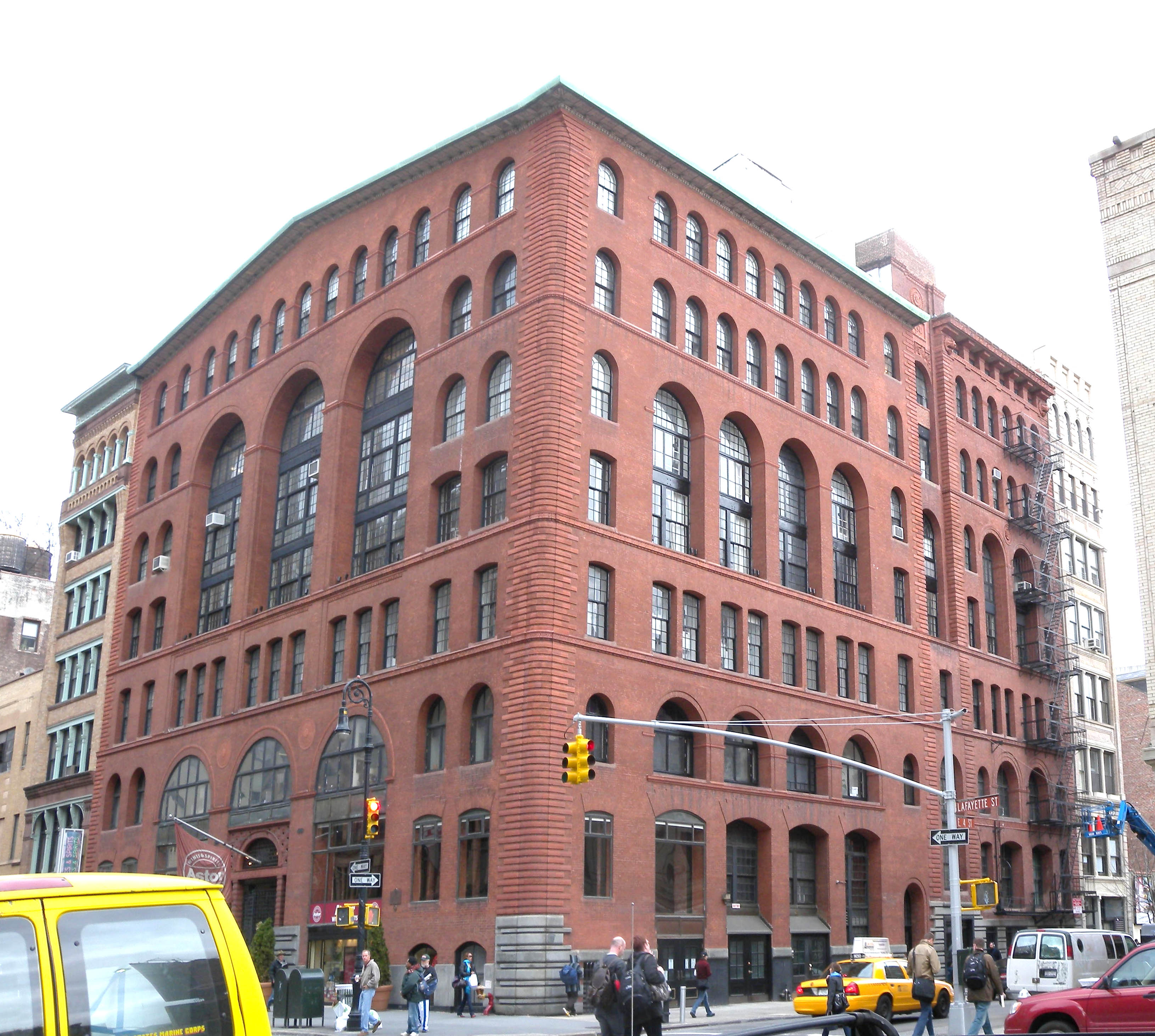
Babb was involved in the designing of buildings such as the De Vinne Press Building.

George Fletcher Babb (1835–1915) was an American architect who worked primarily in New Jersey and New York. Although he designed several buildings independently, he is best known for his work as senior partner at Babb, Cook & Willard, a partnership he formed with Walter Cook in 1877.

== Career ==
In his time with Babb, Cook & Willard, Babb was involved in the design of several well known New York buildings, including the cast-iron office building and the De Vinne Press Building. He was also known for designing alterations to the summer home of the sculptor Augustus Saint-Gaudens, now the Saint-Gaudens National Historic Site in New Hampshire.

In addition to his architectural work, Babb was known in his time for his work designing the covers of publications such as Century Magazine and Sport with Rod and Gun. He also designed the De Vinne Centennial, a motif featuring a quote in Greek by Prometheus, which was used in books printed by De Vinne beginning in 1886.

== Personal life ==
Babb was sometimes referred to as "Badger Babb" by his friends, who are said to have valued his "dry humor and the intricacy of his puns."
