= Architectural light shelf =

Horizontal surface that reflects daylight deep into a building

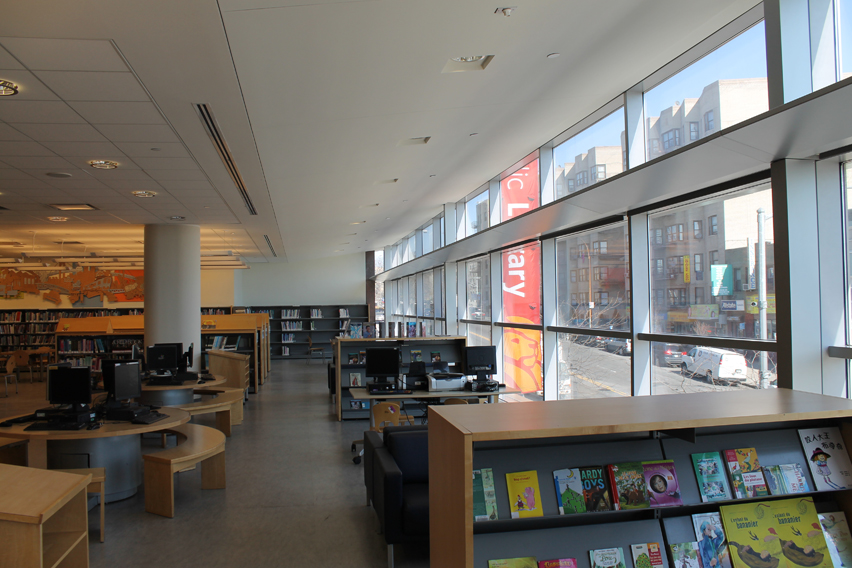
Curtain wall and light shelf, in the second-floor children's library of Bronx Library Center

A light shelf is a horizontal surface that reflects daylight deep into a building. Light shelves are placed above eye-level and have high-reflectance upper surfaces, which reflect daylight onto the ceiling and deeper into the space.

Light shelves are typically used in high-rise and low-rise office buildings, as well as institutional buildings. This design is generally used on the equator-facing side of the building, which is where maximum sunlight is found, and as a result is most effective. Not only do light shelves allow light to penetrate through the building, they are also designed to shade near the windows, due to the overhang of the shelf, and help reduce window glare. Exterior shelves are generally more effective shading devices than interior shelves. A combination of exterior and interior shelves will work best in providing an even illumination gradient.

== Benefits ==
Architectural light shelves have been proven to reduce the need for artificial lighting in buildings. Since they can reflect light deeper into a space, the use of incandescent and fluorescent lighting can be reduced or eliminated, depending on the space. Light shelves make it possible for daylight to penetrate the space up to 2.5 times the distance between the floor and the top of the window. Today, advanced light shelf technology makes it possible to increase the distance up to 4 times. In spaces such as classrooms and offices, light shelves have been proven to increase occupant comfort and productivity. Furthermore, incorporating light shelves in a building design is admissible for the LEED point system, falling under the “Indoor Environment Quality: Daylight & Views” category.

== Limitations ==
Light shelves may not be suitable for all climates. They are generally used in mild climates and not in tropical or desert climates due to the intense solar heat gain. These hot climates, compared to mild climates, require very small window openings to reduce the amount of heat infiltration.

The fact that light shelves extend a fair distance into a room may result in interference with sprinkler systems. In Canada, they cannot exceed 1200 mm (4 ft.) in width if sprinklers are present or the design will require integration with sprinkler system to cover the floor area under the light shelf. They also require a higher than average floor-to-ceiling height in order for them to be effective, or daylight may be inadvertently redirected into occupants' eyes.

The distance into a space that light is cast is variable depending on both the time of day and the time of year.

Light shelves also increase maintenance requirements and window coverings must be coordinated with light shelf design.

== Alternatives ==
Alternatives to light shelves for window daylighting include blinds and louver systems, both of which can be interior or exterior.

Blinds reduce solar gain, but do little to redirect light into the interior space.

Exterior louver systems often rely on adjustments from either complex servo motors or building occupants throughout the day to operate well. Both of these systems can be unreliable at times, reducing the overall benefit of having a daylighting system.

== See also ==
- Architectural lighting design
- Daylighting
