= List of Queens Public Library branches =

The Queens Public Library, also known as the Queens Library and Queens Borough Public Library, is one of three separate and independent public library systems in New York City. The other two are the New York Public Library (serving the Bronx, Manhattan, and Staten Island), and the Brooklyn Library (serving Brooklyn).

== Libraries in Queens ==
c	Library	Image	Contact Information	Historical Note
1	Arverne		312 Beach 54th Street, Arverne, NY 11692	The Arverne branch was located at Beach 75th Street and Rockaway Beach Boulevard, Arverne, from 1915 to 1921. It moved to 488 Beach 66th Street in 1922, and was there until 1935. From 1951 to 1964, it was located at 339 Beach 54th Street, until it moved into its current location at 312 Beach 54th Street, Arverne in 1964.
2	Astoria		14-01 Astoria Boulevard, Astoria, NY 11102	The Astoria branch was first opened on February 28, 1899, at 112 Fulton Avenue, Astoria, NY. In 1904, it moved to its current location at 1401 Astoria Boulevard.
3	Auburndale		25-55 Francis Lewis Boulevard, Flushing, NY 11358	The Auburndale branch first opened in 1930 at 199-10 32nd Avenue, Auburndale. It was located at 200-15 32nd Avenue from 1937 to 1952, at 29-09 Francis Lewis Boulevard. 1952–1969, and 25-55 Francis Lewis Boulevard. from 1969 to the present.
4	Baisley Park		117-11 Sutphin Boulevard, Jamaica, NY 11436	The Baisley Park branch first opened on June 25, 1935, at 116-03 Sutphin Boulevard, Baisley Park, and was at that location until 1970. On Dec 14, 1970, it moved to its present location, 117-11 Sutphin Boulevard., Baisley Park.
5	Bay Terrace		18-36 Bell Boulevard, Bayside, NY 11360	The Bay Terrace branch first opened on February 20, 1981.
6	Bayside		214-20 Northern Boulevard, Bayside, NY 11361	The Bayside branch has moved four times; 1906–1911, Bell Avenue, near Palace Avenue, Bayside: 1912–1934, at Elsie Pl. and 1st St: 1935–1965, 39-28 Bell Boulevard, Bayside: and 1965-its present location.
7	Bellerose		250-06 Hillside Avenue, Bellerose, NY 11426	The Bellerose branch was first opened on February 27, 1978.
8	Briarwood		85-12 Main Street, Briarwood, NY 11435	The Briarwood branch was first opened on April 14, 1975.
9	Broad Channel		16-26 Cross Bay Boulevard, Broad Channel, NY 11693	The Broad Channel branch has been open since the summer of 1990–present.
10	Broadway		40-20 Broadway, Astoria, NY 11103	The Broadway branch first opened in 1906 at 37-19 Broadway, Astoria, New York. It moved five subsequent times until it was relocated to 40-20 Broadway, Astoria, on April 28, 1958, where it remains today.
11	Cambria Heights		218-13 Linden Boulevard, Cambria Heights, NY 11411	The Cambria Heights branch first opened in July, 1949 on 220-20 Linden Boulevard, Cambria Heights. Since 2006, the branch has been at 218-13 Linden Boulevard, Cambria Heights.
12	Central Library and The Archives		89-11 Merrick Boulevard, Jamaica, NY 11432	
13	Corona		38-23 104th Street, Corona, NY 11368	The Corona branch had its first days at 13 Locust Street, Corona, from 1912 to 1913. It has since moved five times to its present location at 38-23 104th Street, in March 1969.
14	Court Square		25-01 Jackson Avenue, Long Island City, NY 11101	The Court Square branch opened on Jackson Avenue, Long Island City, in October, 1989. It closed in February 2020.
15	Douglaston/Little Neck		249-01 Northern Boulevard, Little Neck, NY 11363	The Douglaston branch was in operation from 1914 to 1934.
16	East Elmhurst		95-06 Astoria Boulevard, East Elmhurst, NY 11369	The East Elmhurst branch has been around from 1972–present.
17	East Flushing		196-36 Northern Boulevard, Flushing, NY 11358	The East Flushing branch has been open at 196-36 Northern Boulevard since September 1977.
18	Elmhurst		86-07 Broadway, Elmhurst, NY 11373	The Elmhurst branch has been open from September 1972 – present and was rebuilt extensively in 2011–2016.
19	Far Rockaway		1637 Central Avenue, Far Rockaway, NY 11691	The Far Rockaway branch has been open from August 1904 – present, and is currently located at 1637 Central Avenue, Far Rockaway.
20	Flushing		41-17 Main Street, Flushing, NY 11355	The Flushing branch first opened in January, 1902 at Jamaica Ave and Jagger Avenue. It moved 3 times until it settled at its present location in 1998 at 41-17 Main Street, Flushing, New York.
21	Forest Hills		108-19 71st Avenue, Forest Hills, NY 11375	The Forest Hills branch first opened in 1915 at 1 Station Sq, Forest Hills, NY. It moved 5 times until settling in its present location at 108-19 71st Avenue in 1947.
22	Fresh Meadows		193-20 Horace Harding Expressway, Fresh Meadows, NY 11365	The Fresh Meadows branch was located at 195-13 69th Avenue, from 1949 to 1958, until it moved to 193-20 Horace Harding Expressway, Fresh Meadows, in 1958, and still remains today.
23	Glen Oaks		256-04 Union Turnpike, Glen Oaks, NY 11004	The Glen Oaks branch has had two locations: From 1950 to 1956, it was at 256-25 Union Turnpike, Glen Oaks, NY, and from 1956–present it was just down the street at 256-04 Union Turnpike.
24	Glendale		78-60 73rd Place, Glendale, NY 11385	The Glendale branch has had four locations, opening first in April 1911 at 123 Edison in Glendale, and presently occupying a location at 78-60 73rd Place.
25	Hillcrest		187-05 Union Turnpike, Flushing, NY 11366	The Hillcrest branch has been open from 1980–present at 187-05 Union Turnpike, Hillcrest.
26	Hollis		202-05 Hillside Avenue, Hollis, NY 11423	The Hollis branch has moved seven times, and has been open since 1906. It currently is located at 202-05 Hillside Avenue, Hollis, NY.
27	Howard Beach	A one-story brick building in a 1960s architectural style stands with a waving American flag before it.	92-06 156th Avenue, Howard Beach, NY 11414	The Howard Beach location first opened in May 1963. It moved to its present location at 92-06 156th Avenue in November 1978.
27	Hunters Point	Hunters Point Community Library	47-40 Center Boulevard, Long Island City, NY 11109	The Hunters Point Community Library opened on September 24, 2019, more than 15 years after it was proposed. It is 22,000 ft^{2} (2,000 m^{2}) and 82 feet (25 m) tall.
28	Jackson Heights		35-51 81st Street, Jackson Heights, NY 11372	The Jackson Heights branch has moved five times. It was opened in 1918, and has been at its current location at 35-51 81st Street, Jackson Heights, since 1954.
29	Kew Gardens Hills		72-33 Vleigh Place, Flushing, NY 11367	The Kew Gardens Hills branch was formerly the Vleigh branch. It has been open since 1998 at 72-33 Vleigh Place.
30	Langston Hughes		100-01 Northern Boulevard, Corona, NY 11368	The Langston Hughes branch first opened in 1969, and was open at that location until 1999. It moved to its current location at 100-01 Northern Boulevard in 1999.
31	Laurelton		134-26 225th Street, Laurelton, NY 11413	The Laurelton branch was first opened in 1936. It has moved 2 times, the 2nd move in 1954, was to its present location at 134-26 225th Street.
32	Lefferts		103-34 Lefferts Boulevard, Richmond Hill, NY 11419	The Lefferts branch opened in 1975 at 103-34 Lefferts Boulevard, and remains there today.
33	Lefrak City		98-30 57th Avenue, Corona, NY 11368	The Lefrak City branch was first opened in December 1966, and moved to its present location at 98-30 57th Avenue, Corona in 1997.
34	Long Island City		37-44 21st Street, Long Island City, NY 11101	The Long Island City branch has been open from July 2007 – present. The branch was formerly the Queensbridge and Ravenswood branches.
35	Maspeth		69-70 Grand Avenue, Maspeth, NY 11378	The Maspeth branch has moved six times since its opening in 1915. It has been located at 69-70 Grand Avenue, Maspeth, since 1975.
36	McGoldrick		155-06 Roosevelt Avenue, Flushing, NY 11354	The McGoldrick branch was first opened in 1933. It was named for Father Edward McGoldrick, the founding pastor of the nearby Catholic parish of St. Andrew Avellino. Father McGoldrick, who died in 1930, had also been a member of the board of directors of the (then) Queens Borough Public Library. It has moved 3 times, and has been at its current location at 155-06 Roosevelt Avenue, Flushing since 1974.
37	Middle Village		72-31 Metropolitan Avenue, Middle Village, NY 11379	The Middle Village branch has moved seven times since it was opened in 1915. It has occupied its current location since 1990 at 72-31 Metropolitan Avenue, Middle Village.
38	Mitchell-Linden		31-32 Union Street, Flushing, NY 11354	The Mitchell-Linden branch has been open at 29-42 Union Street since March 1962. In 2013, it moved to its current location.
39	North Forest Park		98-27 Metropolitan Avenue, Forest Hills, NY 11375	The North Forest Park branch has been open at 98-27 Metropolitan Avenue since January 1982.
40	North Hills		57-04 Marathon Parkway, Little Neck, NY 11362	The North Hills branch has had two locations; the first from 1964 to 1987 at 245-24 Horace Harding Expressway, and the second at 57-04 Marathon Parkway from 1987–present.
41	Ozone Park		92-24 Rockaway Boulevard, Ozone Park, NY 11417	The Ozone Park branch has moved six times. It first opened in 1901, and has resided at its current location since 1977.
42	Peninsula		92-25 Rockaway Beach Boulevard, Rockaway Beach, NY 11693	The Peninsula branch was formerly known as Rockaway Beach branch; it has been open since 1972 at 92-25 Rockaway Beach Boulevard.
43	Pomonok		158-21 Jewel Avenue, Flushing, NY 11365 40.7325°N 73.8102°E	The Pomonok branch has had two locations - first opening in 1952 at 67-09 Kissena Boulevard, and then relocating in 1970 to 158-21 Jewel Avenue.
44	Poppenhusen		121-23 14th Avenue, College Point, NY 11356	The Poppenhusen branch opened in 1903, and currently resides in the same location that it was opened.
45	Queens Village		94-11 217th Street, Queens Village, NY 11428 40.7199°N 71.7391°W	The Queens Village branch has moved five times since it opened in 1900. It has been at its current location at 94-11 217th Street since 1952.
46	Queensboro Hill		60-05 Main Street, Flushing, NY 11355	The Queensboro Hill branch has been located at 60-05 Main Street, since 1940.
47	Ravenswood		35-32 21st Street, Long Island City, NY 11106.40.7607°N 73.9363°W	Ravenswood has moved 2 times, and is now a Family Literacy Center.
48	Rego Park		91-41 63rd Drive, Rego Park, NY 11374	The Rego Park branch has been open since 1937. It was moved 3 times, each time within the same block, and has been at its current location since March 1975.
49	Richmond Hill		118-14 Hillside Avenue, Richmond Hill, NY 11418	Richmond Hill branch has held the same location since its opening in 1901.
50	Ridgewood		20-12 Madison Street, Ridgewood, NY 11385 40.7052°N 73.9025°W	Ridgewood branch moved three times between its opening in 1912, and 1929. Since then has occupied 20-12 Madison Street, Ridgewood.
51	Rochdale Village		169-09 137th Avenue, Jamaica, NY 11434	Rochdale Village branch opened in 1969 at 169-09 137th Avenue, Baisley Park, and has remained at the location.
52	Rosedale		144-20 243rd Street, Rosedale, NY 11422	Rosedale branch has moved four times. It was first opened in 1920, and has been at its present location at 144-20 243rd Street, Rosedale, since 1962.
53	Seaside		116-15 Rockaway Beach Boulevard, Rockaway Park, NY 11694	Seaside branch has moved six times. It first opened in 1907, and has been at its present location since 1980.
54	South Hollis		204-01 Hollis Avenue, South Hollis, NY 11412	South Hollis branch was opened at 204-01 Hollis Avenue, Hollis, in 1974, and remains there to this day.
55	South Jamaica		108-41 Guy R. Brewer Boulevard, Jamaica, NY 11433 40.6955°N 73.790°W	South Jamaica branch was opened in 1961, and have moved once to its present location at 108-41 Guy R. Brewer Boulevard, South Jamaica.
56	South Ozone Park		128-16 Rockaway Boulevard, South Ozone Park, NY 11420 40.675°N 73.809°W	South Ozone Park branch was first opened in 1912. It has moved six times. It currently is located at 128-16 Rockaway Boulevard, South Ozone Park.
57	St. Albans		191-05 Linden Boulevard, St. Albans, NY 11412 40.692°N 73.760°W	The St. Albans branch was first opened in 1920, and has moved five times.
58	Steinway		21-45 31st Street, Long Island City, NY 11105	The Steinway branch was first opened in 1890 in Steinway, and has moved four times. It has been located at 21-45 31st Street, Steinway since 1955.
59	Sunnyside		43-06 Greenpoint Avenue, Long Island City, NY 11104 40.7408°N 73.922°W	The Sunnyside branch was first opened in 1935. It has been located at 43-06 Greenpoint Avenue since 1976.
60	Whitestone		151-10 14 Road, Whitestone, NY 11357	The Whitestone branch was first opened in 1907. It has moved three times, to its present location at 151-10 14th Road, Whitestone, NY.
61	Windsor Park		79-50 Bell Boulevard, Bayside, NY 11364 40.7345°N 73.7556°W	The Windsor Park branch first opened in 1951. It moved in 1956 to 79-50 Bell Boulevard, where it currently operates.
62	Woodhaven		85-41 Forest Parkway, Woodhaven, NY 11421	The Woodhaven branch was originally called the Manor branch. It opened in 1918, and moved in 1924 to its present location at 85-41 Forest Parkway.
63	Woodside		54-22 Skillman Avenue, Woodside, NY 11377	The Woodside branch has been open since 1911. It moved two times, to its current location at 54-22 Skillman Avenue.

== See also ==
- List of Carnegie libraries in New York City
- List of New York Public Library branches
- List of Brooklyn Public Library branches
- Queens Memory Project
- List of libraries in the United States
