= Hall-Benedict Drug Company Building =

- U.S. National Register of Historic Places
- U.S. Historic district – Contributing property
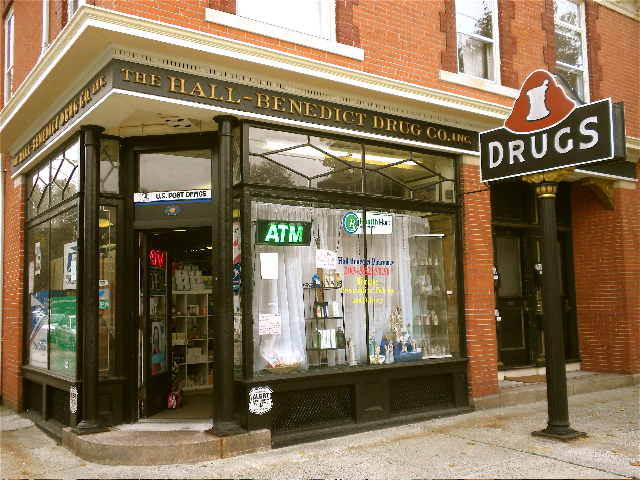

- Location within Connecticut Location within the United States
- Location: 763-767 Orange Street, New Haven, Connecticut
- Coordinates: 41°19′16″N 72°54′45″W
- Area: 0.1 acres (0.040 ha)
- Built: 1909
- Architect: Brown, Frank Elwood
- Architectural style: Colonial Revival, Queen Anne
- Part of: Whitney Street Historic District (ID88003209)
- NRHP reference No.: 86001205

Significant dates
- Added to NRHP: June 05, 1986
- Designated CP: February 2, 1989

The Hall-Benedict Drug Company Building is a historic commercial building at 763-767 Orange Street in the East Rock neighborhood of New Haven, Connecticut. Built in 1909 to house a pharmacy, it is a little-altered and well-preserved example of an early 20th-century mixed residential-commercial neighborhood building. The building was listed on the National Register in 1986. It is also a contributing property in the Whitney Avenue Historic District.

== Description and history ==
The Hall-Benedict Drug Company Building is located northeast of downtown New Haven, on the south corner of Orange and Linden Streets in the East Rock Neighborhood. It is a 2-1/2 story brick structure, built with load-bearing brick walls and a roof that has a steep mansard facade in front and a slightly sloping shed roof to the rear. The front roof face has modillion blocks at the eave, and is pierced by three dormers; the outer two have gabled roofs, while that at the center has a shed roof. The front facade faces Orange Street, and is asymmetrical, with a glassed storefront at the corner that has a recessed entrance. The main building entrance is near the center of the facade, under a continuation of the cornice that extends across the storefront's top. A round-arch window occupies the rightmost bay of the front. Upper-level windows are sash with fixed diamond-light transom windows above. Despite efforts of local preservationists, the original storefront windows were removed in 2020 and replaced with historically inappropriate modern plate-glass windows.

The building was constructed in 1909 for Alonzo B. Hall, a druggist who had just entered partnership with Edward M. Benedict. The only significant alteration to its interior or exterior has been the addition of an ell to its rear in 1929. This is in contrast to most similar buildings of the period in the city, which have been substantially altered. The building was designed by Frank Elwood Brown, a local architect who produced a significant number of designs for modest residences and commercial buildings in the neighborhood.

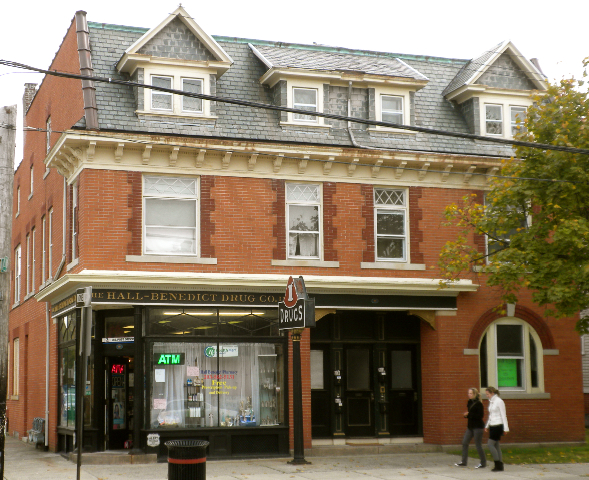
Hall-Benedict Drug Company Building, 763-767 Orange Street, New Haven.

== See also ==
- National Register of Historic Places listings in New Haven, Connecticut
