= Atwater–Ciampolini House =

- Joseph Atwater House
- U.S. Historic district – Contributing property
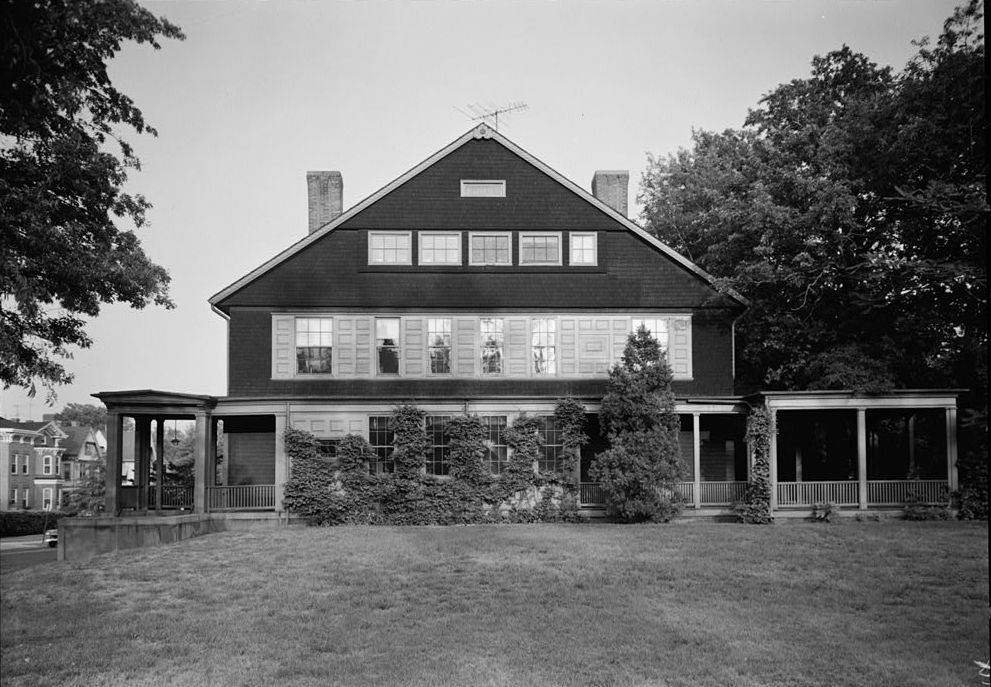
- Front view, in 1964
- Location: 321 Whitney Avenue, New Haven, Connecticut
- Coordinates: 41°19′9.3″N 72°55′6.72″W
- Built: 1890-92
- Architect: Babb, Cook and Willard
- Architectural style: Shingle
- Part of: Whitney Avenue Historic District (ID88003209)
- Added to NRHP: February 2, 1989

The Atwater–Ciampolini House, also known as the Charles Atwater House, is located at 321 Whitney Avenue in New Haven, Connecticut, at the southwest corner of intersection with Edwards Street. It is an important example of Shingle style architecture. It was designed by New York City-based architects Babb, Cook and Willard and was built during 1890-92. For many years the property had served as offices for Thompson and Peck, an insurance agency.

The house was documented by the Historic American Buildings Survey with photographs taken in 1964, 1967, and 1970, and it is a contributing property in the Whitney Avenue Historic District that was listed on the National Register of Historic Places in 1989. According to HABS documentation, the building is discussed and illustrated in Vincent J. Scully, Jr.'s The Shingle Style (1955, Yale University Press). That book is one of the principal documents of the Shingle style.

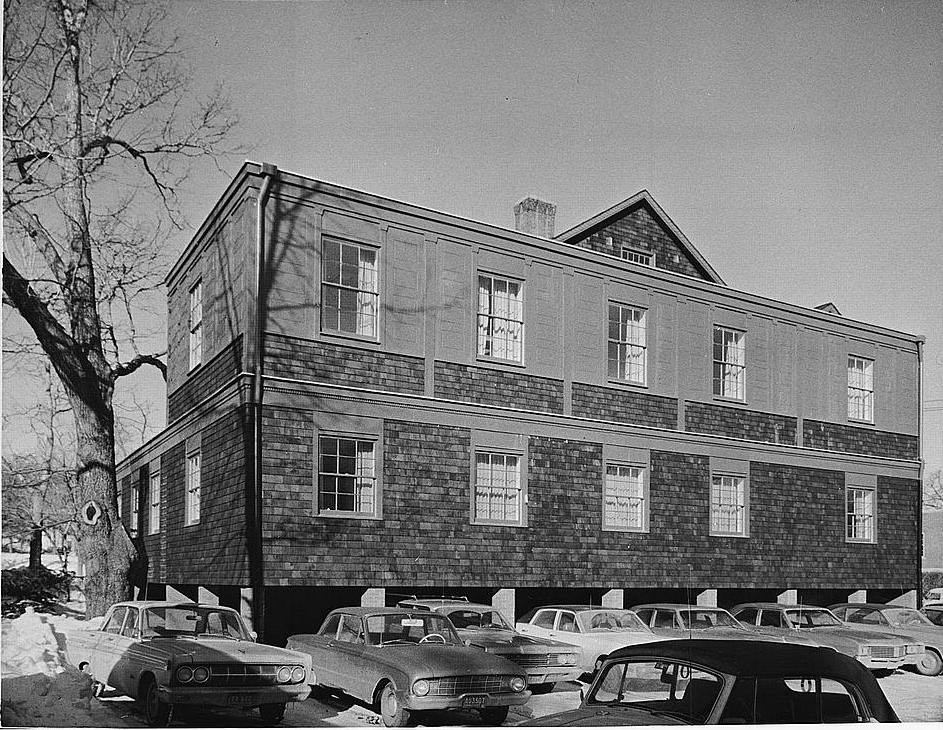
Two story addition from 1969, HABS photo in 1970

The house has gable front, strip windows, and a shingled exterior. The house is two and a half stories tall. A two-story addition at the rear was added in 1969; the architect for the addition was Henry Miller.

In the 1988 nomination of the Whitney Avenue Historic District, the house was described as follows:

The Charles Atwater House of 1890 at 321 Whitney Avenue, recalls McKim, Mead and White's William Low House of Bristol, Rhode Island, of 1887 in its low, spreading roof and banded fenestration with windows separated by panels; it was designed by the nationally renowned firm of Babb, Cook and Willard.

In 1890 the deed was put into the name of Helen G. Atwater, wife of Charles Atwater, when the property was purchased from previous owners. Charles apparently died in 1916 and Helen remarried to Ettore Ciampolini in 1922. The house was purchased by Thompson and Peck in 1968. Today, the Atwater–Ciampolini House serves as the law offices of Balzano & Tropiano, P.C., trial lawyers.
