= Fort Washington Library =

Library in Manhattan, New York

- New York Public Library, Fort Washington Branch
- U.S. National Register of Historic Places
- U.S. Historic district – Contributing property
- New York State Register of Historic Places
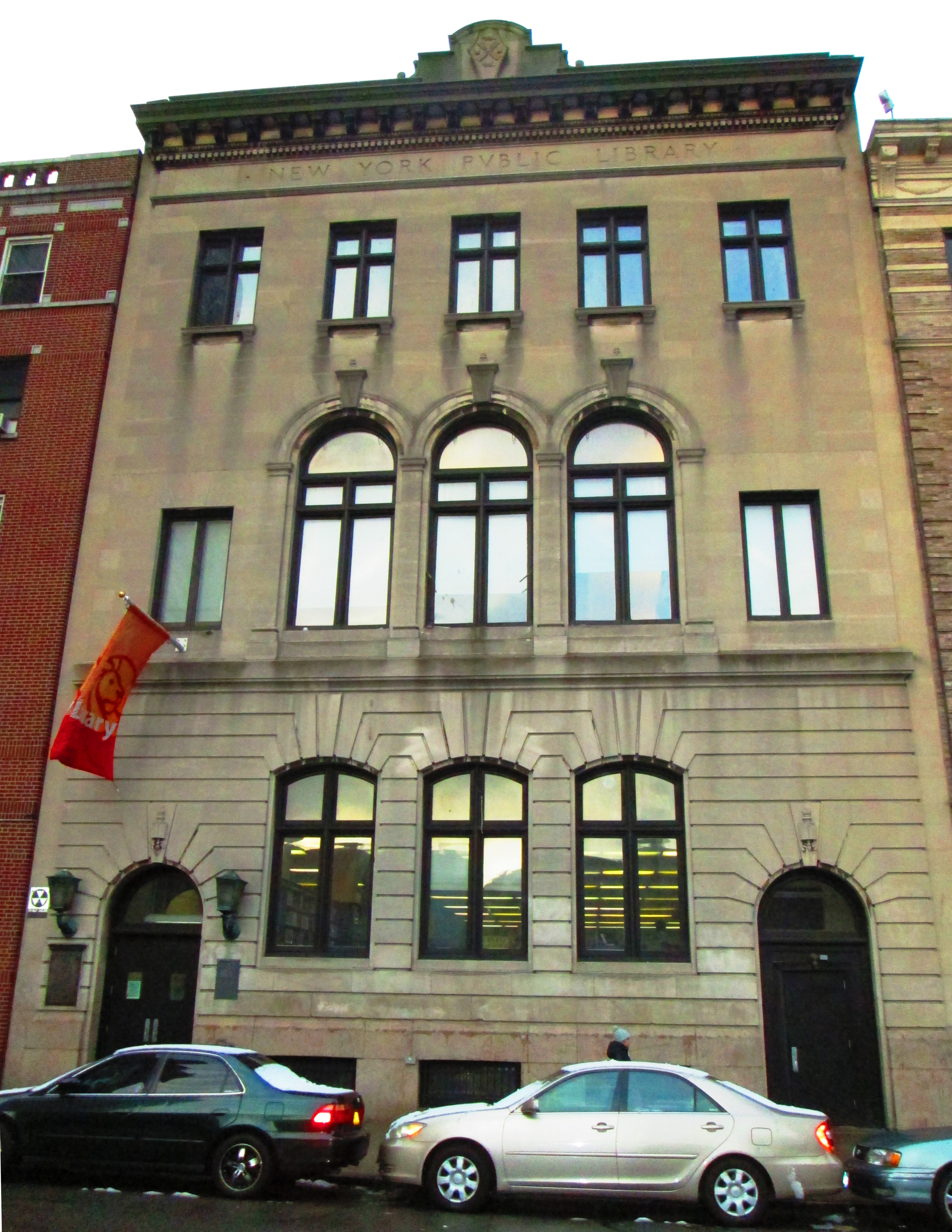

- Location within New York City Location within New York Location within the United States
- Location: 535 West 179th St., Manhattan, New York, US
- Coordinates: 40°50′52″N 73°56′02″W
- Area: 0.12 acres (0.049 ha)
- Built: 1914
- Architect: Cook & Welch
- Part of: Dominican Historic District (ID100011048)
- MPS: Carnegie Libraries of New York City MPS
- NRHP reference No.: 100005470
- NYSRHP No.: 06101.008643

Significant dates
- Added to NRHP: August 27, 2020
- Designated NYSRHP: June 16, 2020

The Fort Washington Library is a branch of the New York Public Library (NYPL) at 535 West 179th Street in the Washington Heights neighborhood of Manhattan, New York City, United States. It was designed by Cook & Welch and opened in April 1914. The facade is constructed in the Italian Renaissance Revival style and is three stories high. Inside, the branch has about 14,500 square feet (1,350 m^{2}) spread across a basement and three floors; this area includes a caretaker's apartment. One of the Carnegie libraries in New York City funded by the businessman Andrew Carnegie, it is on the National Register of Historic Places.

== Description ==
The New York Public Library's Fort Washington Library branch is located at 535 West 179th Street in the Washington Heights neighborhood of Manhattan in New York City, New York, US. It is a Carnegie library designed by Cook & Welch and built by the William L. Crow Construction Company. Like many of Manhattan's Carnegie libraries, it is located in the middle of a block. The building occupies a land lot of 100 by 50 feet (30 by 15 m). The surrounding neighborhood contains five- to six-story apartment buildings, and immediately across 179th Street to the south is the Trans-Manhattan Expressway. The entire city block, aside from a garage facing Audubon Avenue, is residential.

=== Exterior ===
The facade is constructed in the Italian Renaissance Revival style. The main elevation, facing south toward 179th Street, is five bays wide and is made of stone, while the rear elevation in the north is made of brick. The building has three stories, but due to the double-height floors, the building is about as high as the neighboring apartment buildings, which conceal its side elevations. There are lightwells to the east at the third floors, and to the north at the second and third floors. For the most part, the building has its original casement windows with vertical mullions between the panes, many of which are topped by transom windows.

The first story has a rusticated limestone base above a foundation made of granite. The outermost two bays have arched openings with voussoirs and ornamental keystones depicting torches and books. The westernmost bay has the main entrance and is marked by two copper sconces (one on either side), along with a flagpole above it. The ground story facade also has a name plaque and a mailbox. Between these arches are three segmental-arched window openings at the first floor, and three rectangular openings shielded by iron grilles in the basement below. A belt course runs above the first-floor openings.

The second and third stories are clad in smooth ashlar. The second floor is treated like a piano nobile, with three high segmentally-arched windows at the center, set between two smaller rectangular windows. The second-floor windows all have keystones and are set within a contiguous group of arches. The third story has five rectangular windows with splayed lintels. Above the third story is an entablature. The lower part of the entablature has a frieze reading "New York Public Library" in all-capital letters (with the "u" stylized as a Roman "V"), while the upper part has a slightly protruding cornice with modillions.

=== Interior ===
The branch has about 14,500 square feet (1,350 m^{2}) spread across a basement and three floors. Like many Carnegie libraries, the interior had an open plan layout with spaces divided by bookshelves and furniture, rather than fixed-position partition walls. This layout is largely retained except at the first floor's rear western corner, which has an office. A dumbwaiter along the eastern wall of the library could transport books between stories.

The main entrance leads to a vestibule with a double wooden door, which in turn leads to a short staircase ascending to the main first-floor corridor, on the western side of that door. The corridor has stairs up to the second floor and down to the basement. Originally, there was an adult reference collection and reading room on the first floor; the reading room occupied the front portion of the floor, while the stacks were in the back. The modern first-floor layout has a U-shaped circulation desk, dating from the original construction; the rest of the space is subdivided by bookshelves.

Originally, there was a 250-seat meeting room in the basement; the meeting room is in the rear and has since been converted into a reference room. A corridor runs across the building's width, separating the basement's reference room from some offices in the front. The building was also constructed with a children's collection on the second floor, which maintains its original layout, aside from an office at the rear western corner. There is an apartment on the third story, above the main collections, though the apartment has since been subdivided. This was one of several custodial apartments incorporated into Carnegie libraries across New York City.

== History ==
Eastern entrance

Before the Fort Washington Library was constructed, the surrounding section of Washington Heights was still largely undeveloped, a circumstance that continued until the first line of the New York City Subway was expanded to the neighborhood in 1906. The Fort Washington Library was one of 65 Carnegie libraries in New York City to be funded through a donation from the businessman Andrew Carnegie, who had donated $5.2 million (equivalent to $201,240,000 in 2025) for the purpose in 1901. The NYPL selected a site for a new library on 179th Street in 1911, though the existing tenant's lease on the site did not expire until the next year. The architectural contract was awarded in January 1913, followed by the general contract that March. The building was the 37th completed Carnegie library and is cited as having cost $115,000 or $132,607 to build.

The branch opened in March 1914. At the time, it was the farthest north NYPL branch in Manhattan; its next-farthest-north branch was the Washington Heights Library, about 1 mile (1.6 km) south at 160th Street and Saint Nicholas Avenue. The Fort Washington Library was one four NYPL branches to open that year, along with the Washington Heights, Melrose, and Woodstock libraries (the latter two in the Bronx). In 1935–1936, as part of a Works Progress Administration initiative, a Little Theatre Movement stage was built in the library. The theater was used by the branch's in-house theatrical troupe Fort Washington Players, then the Equity Library Theatre, before it was closed and removed in 1949. That year, the third-floor reference room was replaced with one in the basement.

In 2000, the NYPL announced plans to spend $3.1 million renovating the Fort Washington Library, the first major renovation of the branch since its opening. The project included an elevator, accessibility upgrades to the main entrance, new mechanical systems, and expansion of the public collections into the third floor. By the mid-2000s, the branch served 10,000 monthly readers, who were largely Russian or Dominican; during the next decade, it was designated as an "enhanced literacy site", hosting book readings for children. The NYPL spent $12.4 million renovating the library in the early 2010s to make it wheelchair-accessible; this required a four-year closure, after which the library reopened in March 2014. As part of the project, Dattner Architects installed a spiral stair, elevator, and seating area.

The Fort Washington Library was added to the National Register of Historic Places in 2020, and it was also listed on the New York State Register of Historic Places. The branch's custodial apartment was one of seven remaining in New York City's Carnegie libraries by the mid-2020s; at that point, the NYPL had designated the Fort Washington Library for renovations as part of a $176 million program to upgrade five libraries citywide. Following a renovation, it reopened in March 2025.

== See also ==
- List of Carnegie libraries in New York City
- National Register of Historic Places listings in Manhattan above 110th Street

== Sources ==
- [National Park Service] (June 16, 2020). New York Public Library, Fort Washington Branch (Report). National Register of Historic Places, National Park Service. Report hosted on cris.parks.ny.gov (On "Search" tab: Criteria → Lookup → National Register number: 20NR00052 → NR Nomination Form).
