= Cortelyou Library =

Public library in Brooklyn, New York

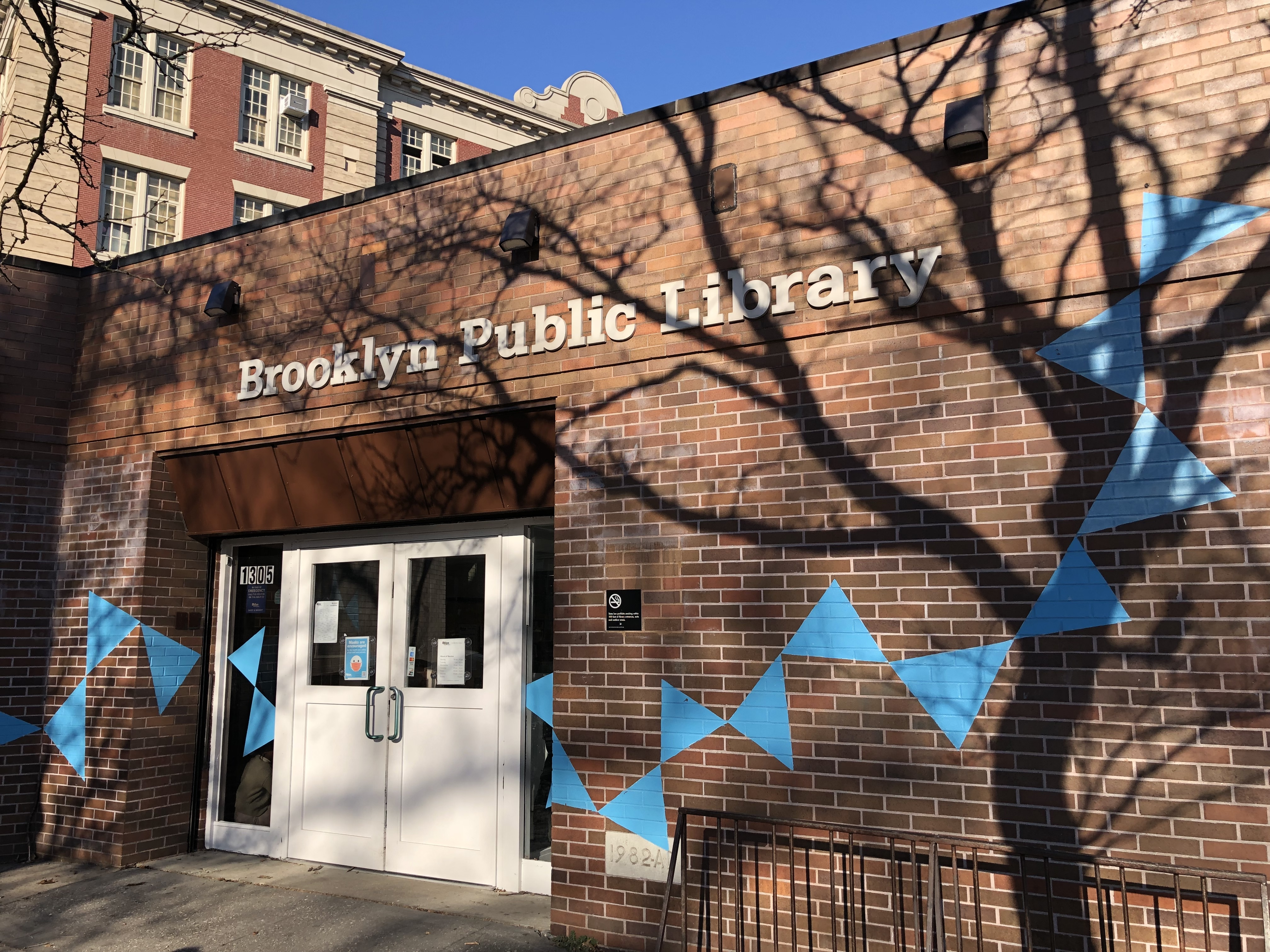
- 40°38′26″N 73°57′58″W
- Location: Brooklyn, New York City

Other information
- Website: Official website

Cortelyou Library is a public library in Flatbush, Brooklyn, located on Cortelyou Road, owned and operated by the Brooklyn Public Library system.

== History ==
Flatbush residents began advocating and planning for the Cortelyou Branch starting in 1969. The branch was completed and opened in 1983. The library was one of the first in NYC to utilize a "merchandising format" of displaying books.

The Cortelyou branch was one of 10 branches to close temporarily during the COVID-19 pandemic.

The library was remodeled in 2021, led by community organization Friends of Cortelyou Library. The branch re-opened in late 2021 after the six month remodel.

== See also ==
- List of Brooklyn Public Library branches
