= Macon Library =

Branch of the Brooklyn Public Library

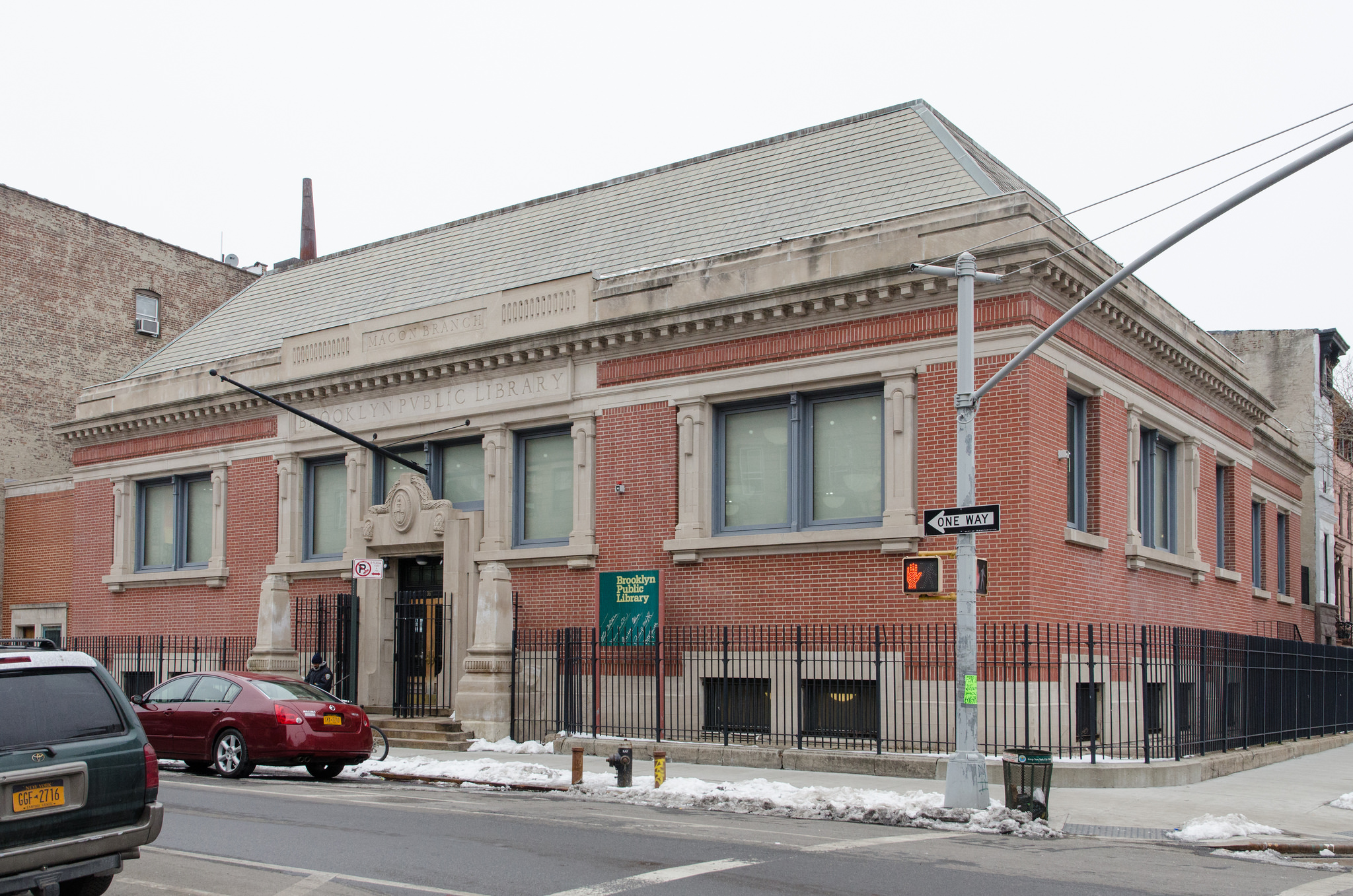
- Macon Library's front entrance in 2015
- Interactive map of the Macon Library area

General information
- Type: Branch library
- Architectural style: Classical Revival
- Location: 361 Lewis Avenue, Brooklyn, New York
- Coordinates: 40.6830071°N 73.9348306°W
- Construction started: 1907
- Opened: July 15, 1907
- Cost: $93,481 (equivalent to $2,300,000 in 2024)
- Owner: Brooklyn Public Library

Technical details
- Material: Brick, limestone
- Floor count: Two
- Grounds: 9,000 square feet (840 m^{2})

Design and construction
- Architect: Richard A. Walker
- Architecture firm: Walker & Morris
- Main contractor: Daniel Ryan

Macon Library is a branch of the Brooklyn Public Library, located in the Bedford–Stuyvesant neighborhood of Brooklyn, New York City. The branch, opened in 1907, was the borough's eleventh Carnegie library. Richard A. Walker designed Macon in the Classical Revival style and the library was built from red brick and limestone trim with a slate roof at a cost of $93,481 (equivalent to $2,300,000 in 2024). In the 1940s, 1970s, and 2000s, the library underwent major renovations and repairs. Despite the changes, design elements present at the library's opening remain, including some bookshelves, guardrails, and wood paneling. Macon Library houses the African American Heritage Center.

== History ==
Situated in Bedford–Stuyvesant, Brooklyn, Macon Library was the eleventh Carnegie library–libraries built with a donation from businessman and philanthropist Andrew Carnegie–to be constructed as part of the Brooklyn Public Library system. Costing $93,481 ($71,481 for the building and its furnishings plus an additional $22,000 for the site), the library was designed by Richard A. Walker of Walker & Morris and built in 1907 on a corner lot at the intersection of Macon Street and Lewis Avenue. The library's construction was conducted by Daniel Ryan of Manhattan. In 1906, the New York City Board of Estimate designated $10,000 for the library's collection. The branch library's opening on July 15, 1907, was attended by 2,000 visitors. Upon its opening, Macon held 10,000 books with the space to expand to 25,000.

The library has undergone a number of repairs and renovations. Between 1948 and 1949, Macon was closed for a repainting, the installation of new windows, the addition of a new heater, and the removal of partitions in its reading areas. Efforts to modernize the library's interior space took place from 1973 to 1977 including an HVAC upgrade, the construction of an auditorium, and the installation of fluorescent lighting. Around 1996, the library was being rehabilitated once again, with efforts underway to improve library accessibility and the building's air conditioning system, and to install a new roof designed to mimic the original roof. The latter project was headed by the architect Leslie Defer. Macon was again renovated between 2006 and 2008 by Sen Architects. The project was intended to bring the library closer to its original appearance by making HVAC systems less visible and replacing the hanging fluorescent lights with lamps like those in the space when it opened. The renovation also included the addition of the African American Heritage Center.

The Brooklyn Public Library announced that Macon Library would be one of the first six libraries in its system to receive exterior digital signage, the first upgrade of exterior signage across the Brooklyn system in over two decades. The project, completed in summer 2017, totaled $35,000.

== Architecture and features ==
Macon Library stands two stories tall and is slightly raised above street level. It occupies the majority of the 90-by-100-foot (27 by 30 m) lot upon which it is situated. The building was designed in the Classical Revival architectural style and consists of five bays. While the library was mainly built with red brick, its front entrance is highlighted by a stone border adorned above the front door with a cartouche. The doors and windows are surrounded by an Indiana limestone trim. Macon Library is capped with a dentillated cornice, below which its windows rest, high on the building's facade. The Brooklyn Daily Eagle singled out Macon as one of Brooklyn's best-lighted libraries in 1907. Near the front entrance are two pillars that at one time sported lamps. The building is surrounded by an iron fence and topped with a slate roof.

Inside, the library is divided into two main spaces: alcoves and larger reading areas. The building's main desk is located in the center-front of the floor plan, while its stacks are located in the back, on the first and second floors. On the upper level, the original metal guardrail continues to protect patrons, and the bookcases and wood paneling that was present when Macon opened is also still used. The library's small alcoves contain wooden benches and fireplaces present when the library opened. A series of frescoes and panels with phrases such as Living Brave and Patriotic Men Are Better Than Gold and No Gain Without Pains were inlaid on the mantelpieces above the fireplaces, but the panels with their verbiages are no longer present.

== See also ==
- List of Brooklyn Public Library branches
