= Andrew Heiskell Braille and Talking Book Library =

Library in Manhattan, New York

Coordinates: 40°44′26″N 73°59′36″W

Heiskell Library for the Blind (2026)

The Andrew Heiskell Braille and Talking Book Library, also known as the Heiskell Library and formerly as the Andrew Heiskell Library for the Blind and Physically Handicapped and the New York Free Circulating Library for the Blind, is a branch of New York Public Library (NYPL) on West 20th Street in the Flatiron District of Manhattan, New York City. It provides reading materials in a format accessible to those unable to read print due to blindness, low vision, or other visual impairments. The current location in the Flatiron District opened in 1991, and may be the first US library to have braille and other accessible materials available to the public.

The library was established as the New York Free Circulating Library for the Blind by Richard Randall Ferry in 1895 and it expanded in its remit through legislation and partnerships with both the Library of Congress and NYPL.

The branch's prior location, which opened in 1953, was in SoHo on Sixth Avenue near Spring Street, which had previously held NYPL maintenance operations. An expansion and move was approved and funded in 1988 following years of advocacy.

Upon opening on 20th Street, the library's collection of more than 515,000 volumes was primarily circulated via mail order due to the space limitations of the branch's prior location, with more than two thousand moving per day. The library, which is named for former NYPL Chair Andrew Heiskell, occupies six floors of an early 20th-century building. It is also part of the Library of Congress' branches dedicated to those with physical or other disabilities.

As of 2019, it held about 14,000 braille titles, believed to be among the largest such collection in the United States and its circulation was 500,000 volumes annually.
