= Brooklyn Heights Branch Library =

Branch of Brooklyn Public Library

Coordinates: 40.6957°N 73.9913°W

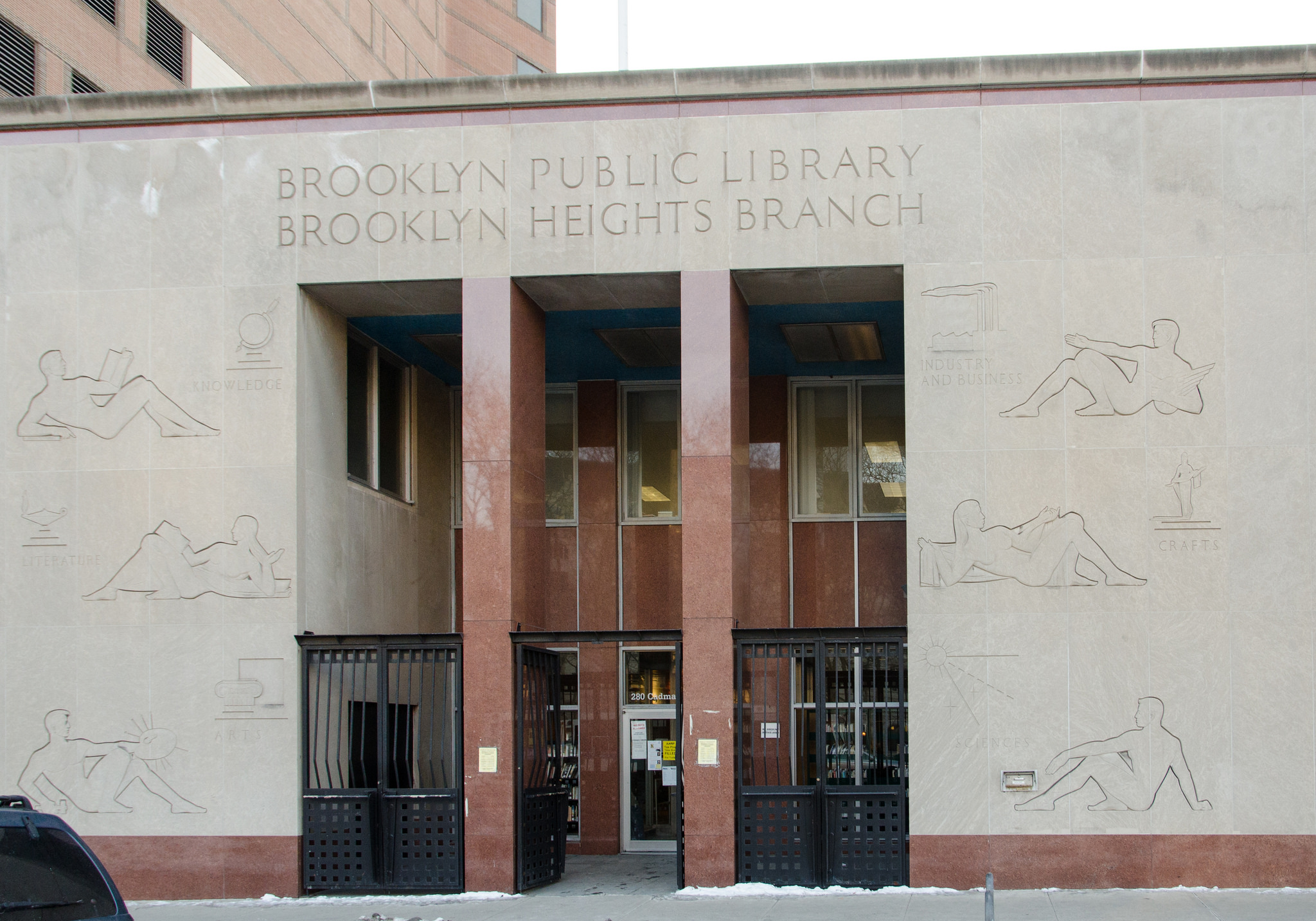
Former Brooklyn Heights Library, demolished in 2015

The Brooklyn Heights Branch Library is at 280 Cadman Plaza West in Brooklyn Heights, near Downtown Brooklyn, in New York City. It is a branch of the Brooklyn Public Library (BPL) and the former home of the Business & Career Library.

The branch's history precedes that of the BPL itself. In 1852, prominent citizens established the Brooklyn Athenaeum and Reading Room for the instruction of young men. In 1857, a group of young men established the Brooklyn Mercantile Library Association of the City of Brooklyn, which shared a building with the Athenaeum. The Mercantile Library attempted to be more practical, placing less emphasis on Literature and philosophy. The librarian in charge was Stephen Buttrick Noyes. In 1866, he went to work at the Library of Congress.

In 1869, the Mercantile Library and the Athenaeum consolidated their holdings and moved to a new building, the Montague Street Branch Library. Also in 1869, Noyes returned, and one of his labors on his return was the preparation of a catalog, which was issued in 1881. In 1878, the Mercantile Library was renamed the Brooklyn Library. By 1943, the Business Reference Department was known as the Business Library. The library outgrew its space, and in 1957, a new building to house both the Business Library and the Brooklyn Heights neighborhood branch was approved by city government. On June 1, 1962, the new $2.5 million library building opened its doors to the public at its current location. In 1993, a two-year renovation and expansion was completed; the renovated building housed both the Brooklyn Heights branch and Business & Career Library.

In 2013, BPL announced its intent to sell 280 Cadman Plaza West, and as part of this announcement, the Business and Career Library's functions were relocated to BPL's Central Branch. BPL then sold the branch to developer Hudson Companies. Hudson Companies then demolished the structure and replaced it with a 34-story condominium, which would contain a smaller Brooklyn Heights branch library at its base upon completion. In the interim, the BPL opened a temporary branch at 109 Remsen Street. In June 2022, the condominium building was completed, and the new library at its base was opened.
