= Bronx Library Center =

Branch of the New York Public Library in the Bronx, New York

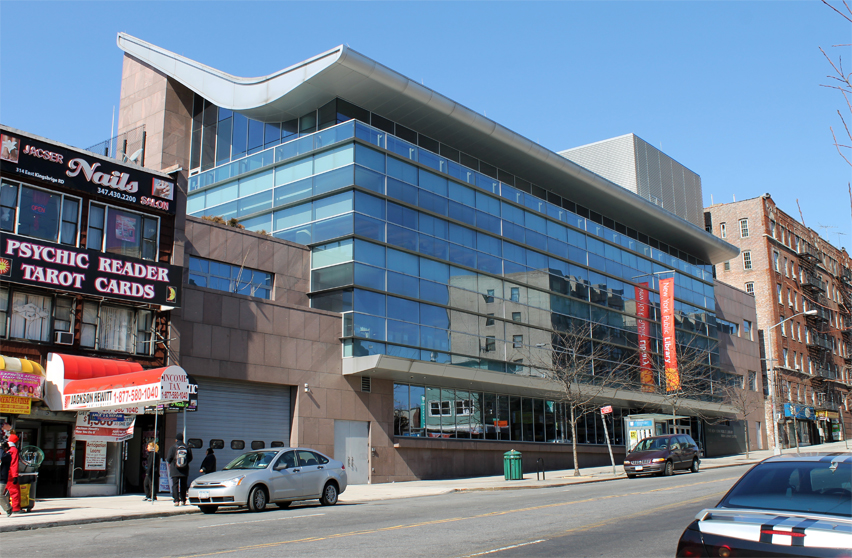
- View from Kingsbridge Road looking northwest
- 40°51′47″N 73°53′40″W
- Location: 310 East Kingsbridge Road, Bronx, New York 10458, United States
- Type: Circulating library
- Established: January 17, 2006
- Architect: Dattner Architects
- Branch of: New York Public Library

Other information
- Website: www.nypl.org/locations/bronx-library-center

The Bronx Library Center is a branch of the New York Public Library in the Fordham section of the Bronx in New York City. The library is located at 310 East Kingsbridge Road between Fordham Road and East 192nd Street, two blocks east of the Grand Concourse. It is the central library for the Bronx, and the largest library in the borough.

The library opened in January 2006, replacing the Fordham Branch Library, which had previously served the Bronx. At 78,000 square feet (7,200 m^{2}), it is the first "green" library in New York City with LEED Silver certification; it also has three times as much space as its predecessor. This building cost an estimated $50 million and is characterized by the sloping curve of its roof and the extensive glass curtain wall on the eastern elevation of the facade.

The building was designed by the New York City-based architecture firm Dattner Architects, led by architect Richard Dattner.

== Site ==
The library is in the Fordham Heights neighborhood of the Bronx, overlooking the shopping strip along Fordham Road and facing the old library on Bainbridge Avenue to the east. The massive new building is highly visible from East Kingsbridge Road, contrasting drastically with its neighboring buildings, which are primarily low-rise commercial or residential buildings. The Edgar Allan Poe Cottage, Fordham University, the New York Botanical Garden, and the Bronx Zoo are all nearby. It is close to the New York City Subway's B and D trains at Kingsbridge Road (IND Concourse Line) and the 4 train at Kingsbridge Road (IRT Jerome Avenue Line). The Bx1, Bx2, Bx12 and Bx12 SBS New York City Bus routes are also nearby.

== Design ==
The library contains over 300,000 volumes, including the New York Public Library's central collection of Hispanic/Latino and Puerto Rican heritage works. The building is designed for the digital technology and social/civic functions as well as for books; it contains reading areas, a 150-person auditorium, computer rooms, staff offices, conference rooms, and a public gallery/gathering area, divided among the floors:

- Basement or concourse level - auditorium and writing center.
- Ground floor - Teen center and main circulation desk.
- Second floor - Children's floor
- Third floor - Adult circulating materials
- Fourth floor - Reference materials with computer desks
- Partial fifth floor - Career services center and conference room.

The library also offers classes to the community including financial and career services to help people manage their money and improve their resume-writing in the pursuit of jobs.

=== Facade ===
The building is steel-framed and uses diverse materials in its construction that contrast with each other. The building is intended to be inviting on the interior and bold on the exterior. The exterior face of the library includes a multi-story glazed glass curtain wall (which stretches four stories and cantilevers out from the main body of the library to dominate the facade's front elevation). Water-treated Minnesota red granite panels are used on the rest of the facade and also extend into the interior of the library on the fourth floor towards the terrace. The signature swooping roof is clad in aluminum paneling on the exterior and maple veneer on the interior. Maple softens many of the other surface cladding. The swooping roofline also contributes to visibility and also allows a partial fifth floor for the building while also following setback regulations for the block.

=== Interior ===
While the public areas are lit by the glazing on the front elevation, skylights above staff offices in the building's rear provide daylight for library workers. To help keep the library floors open, circulation is pushed to the back of the building as well. The main stair wraps around the elevator and is framed by a translucent glass wall to provide daylight. Patrons are expected to move through the library from back to front; from the stairs, through the stacks, and finally to the lounging and reading areas that are situated along the curtain wall. The main stair at the back of the library has a frosted channel glass wall, steel handrails, and linoleum flooring. This floor surface is extended to other areas of the building in contrast with the terrazzo and carpeting that weather the high foot traffic hardily.

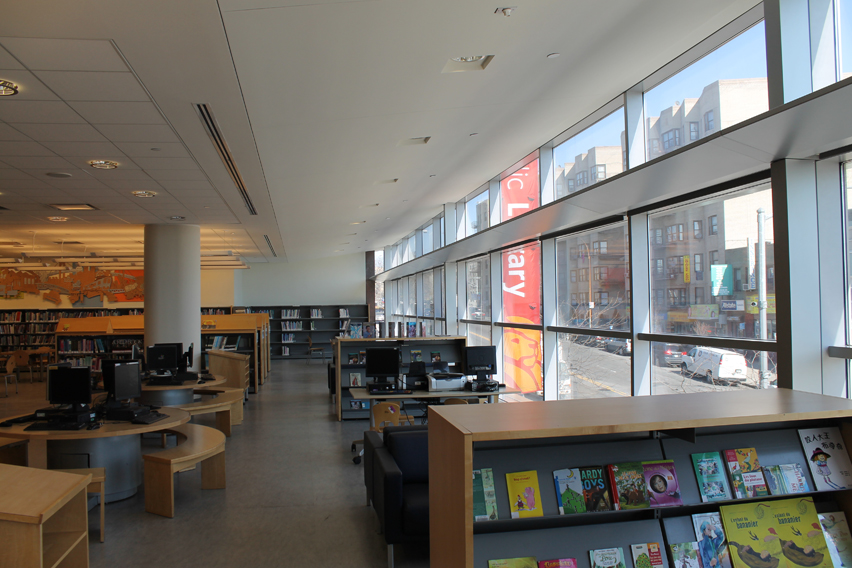
View of the second floor children's library with curtain wall and light shelf

The Bronx Library Center is LEED Silver-certified and is the first "green" library in New York City; it includes many sustainable architecture features. Approximately 40 percent of materials used in the construction of the library were manufactured locally (within 500 miles of the site). The majority of materials produced by the demolition of the Con Edison building on site before the library were recycled to be used in off-site locations. The library itself is composed of roughly 20 percent recycled material. In addition to using environmentally safe materials, chemical release into the atmosphere is further mitigated by water-cooled chillers. The mechanical HVAC systems help provide building energy use of 20 percent less than code requires.

The energy-efficient lighting systems and the extensive use of sunlight are perhaps the boldest sustainable features of the library. The glazed curtain wall is composed of glass with a low U-value for better insulating properties on the interior of the building. At times there may be too much daylight along the perimeter reading areas along the wall, so there are mechanized nylon mesh shades to soften the light and light shelves that bounce some of the strongest light off of the surface and push it deeper into the spaces. Photocell sensors on the ceilings react to daylight levels and automatically change electric lighting intensities accordingly to save energy used. Overall, 75 percent of the interior spaces meet LEED criteria for the ratio of daylight to illuminated light.

== History ==
Fordham Library Center
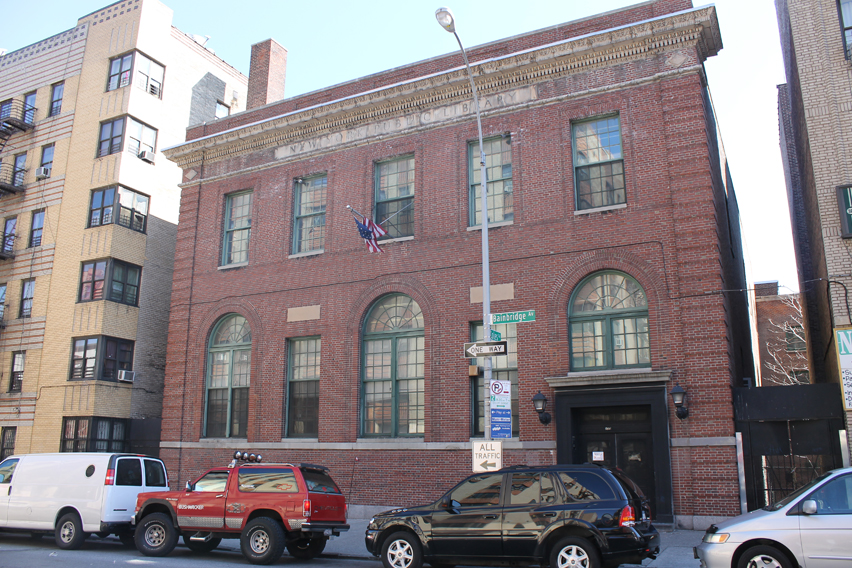
- Former Fordham Library Center, Bainbridge Avenue
- Etymology: Fordham, Bronx

General information
- Status: Completed
- Type: Former library
- Architectural style: Georgian Revival
- Location: The Bronx, 2556 Bainbridge Avenue, New York City, United States
- Coordinates: 40°51′45.76″N 73°53′34.5″W
- Completed: 1923
- Relocated: 2005 (Last year as a library.)
- Renovated: 1956
- Client: New York Public Library
- Owner: New York City Department of Citywide Administrative Services

Technical details
- Material: Brick
- Floor count: 2 (above ground)
- Floor area: 25,000 square feet (2,300 m^{2})
- Lifts/elevators: 1

Design and construction
- Architecture firm: McKim, Mead & White
- Known for: Carnegie library building

For more than 75 years, the Fordham Library Center at 2556 Bainbridge Avenue, served the borough before the new center opened in 2006. The library was part of a public library system built in the United States, supported by donations from wealthy businessman Andrew Carnegie. As part of the Carnegie library system it followed the philosophy of being accessible and free to all people with an emphasis on access and service to working class Americans. The library opened in 1923 and saw multiple expansions and renovations over the decades to continue serving a rapidly growing community. As immigrants (primarily of Irish, Italian and Jewish heritage) moved into the Bronx from Manhattan, they used the library to learn to read and write English and become acclimated to American culture. Compared to main branch libraries in the other outer boroughs, the Bronx building was significantly smaller taking up only three floors at a total of roughly 27,500 square feet. A renovation in 1956 proved to be the last; it would take nearly 50 years before enough money was raised to build a new, bigger, much needed building. The Fordham Library Center officially closed its doors to the public in November 2005. Two months later the Bronx Library Center opened right around the corner.

It was the goal of the New York Public Library and the architects who designed the new library branch in the Bronx to continue the tradition of the accessible library model established by Carnegie. It would remain a welcoming place of learning for a new generation of immigrants primarily from the Caribbean and Latin America with Spanish being the new dominant language. A bigger piece of land was needed to accommodate the new building. Around the corner from the old Carnegie library was the site of a Con Edison building that closed in 1999; the building components were mostly recycled or sold for scraps to fund demolition.

After a long fund-raising push in the late 1990s, with contributions from New York State Legislature and allocation of funds by former mayor Rudolph Giuliani, the New York Public Library acquired the site for the new library in 2001. The Bronx Library Center is New York City's first "green" library, with many sustainable features. It's LEED Silver-certified and was built using environmentally safe materials, including recycled materials. The library also has energy-efficient lighting systems and water-cooled chillers to reduce chemical release into the atmosphereThe Bronx Library Center has a large Vejigante mask that hangs high above the floor. The mask is a piece of folk art that originated in Medieval Spain and is used to honor Saint James.

== Programs and Services ==
The Bronx Library Center offers a variety of programs and services for children, teens, and adults. Adult programs include job and career support, social services assistance, fitness classes, technology instruction, and craft programs. Teen programs include movie nights, writing classes, crafts, and college and career advice. Children's programs including storytime, STEAM activities, Spanish workshops, and arts and crafts.

Patrons can also apply for their IDNYC card at the Bronx Library Center. The IDNYC program, launched in 2015, is an identification card for all New Yorkers, regardless of immigration status. In addition to providing a broadly accepted form of identification, there are numerous benefits including free, one-year membership to museums and cultural institutions, and discounts at participating retailers.

== Gallery ==
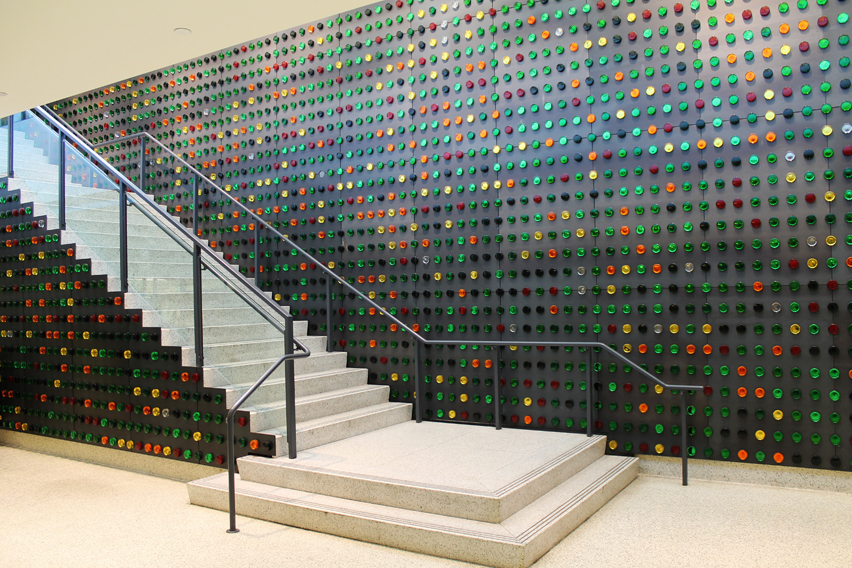
Portrait of a Young Reader, by Iñigo Manglano-Ovalle, flanking the Concourse level stair

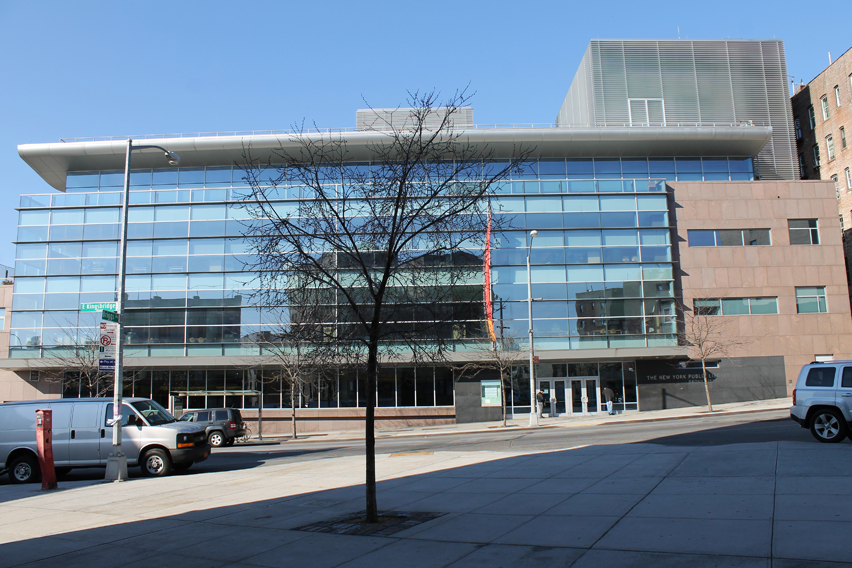
Front/Kingsbridge elevation

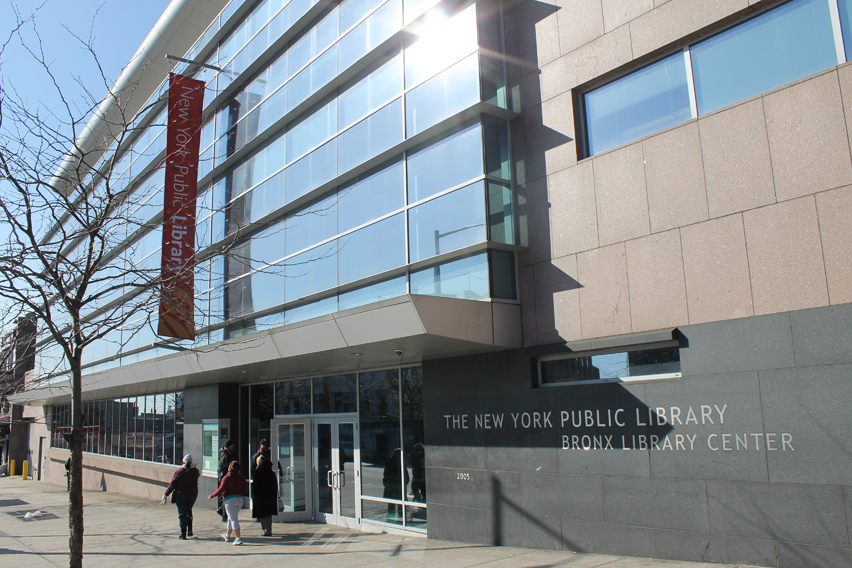
Main entrance off Kingsbridge Road

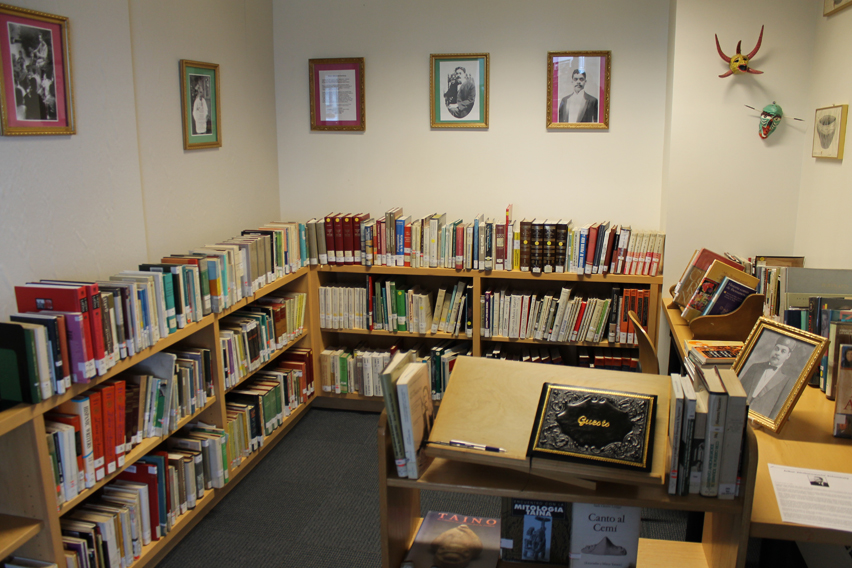
Puerto Rican Heritage Collection room

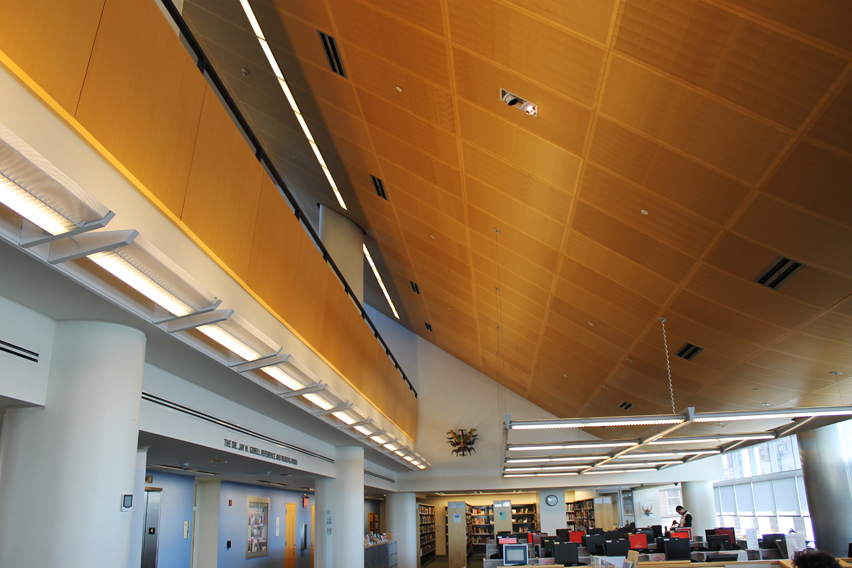
Fourth floor swooping ceiling view
