= Babb, Cook & Willard =

U.S. architectural firm

Babb, Cook & Willard was a New York City-based architectural firm established in 1884 that designed many important houses and commercial buildings. The principals of the firm were George Fletcher Babb (1836–1915), Walter Cook (1843–1916), and Daniel W. Willard. Willard left the firm in 1908, and was replaced by Winthrop A. Welch. The firm was subsequently renamed Babb, Cook and Welch until 1912, when it became Cook and Welch.

== Walter Cook ==
Partner Walter Cook was born in New York and graduated from Harvard College in 1869. He further studied at the Royal Polytechnic School in Munich and at the École des Beaux-Arts in Paris. He returned to New York in 1877 and worked there as an architect until he died on March 25, 1916, aged 70.

== Works ==
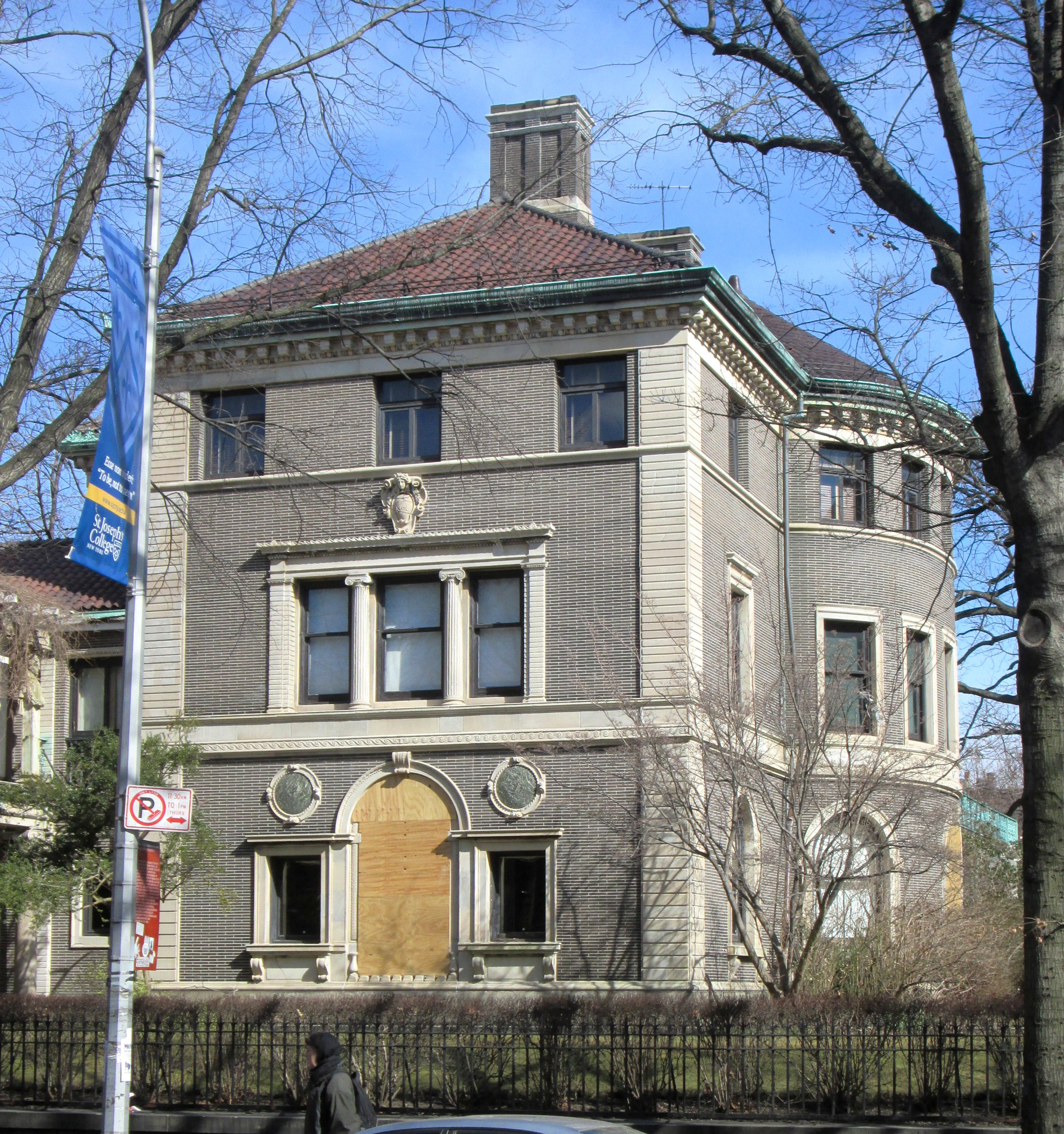
Frederick B. Pratt House

- Andrew Carnegie Mansion, 2 East 91st Street, New York City, designed to be "most modest, plainest, and most roomy house in New York"
- New York Life Insurance Building, Montreal, which was the tallest building in the province of Quebec from 1888 to 1908
- "The Clearing", a Colonial Revival estate house built around 1889 for John Hornor Wisner, a merchant in the China trade, at what is now the Reeves-Reed Arboretum
- De Vinne Press Building, built 1885–1886, listed on the National Register of Historic Places
- About six of 39 Carnegie libraries built in New York City
- Frederick B. Pratt House, in Brooklyn, New York, completed in 1898 in a neo-Georgian style
- Charles Atwater House at 321 Whitney Avenue in New Haven, Connecticut, a significant Shingle style house in the Whitney Avenue Historic District
- William S. Ingraham House in the Federal Hill Historic District of Bristol, Connecticut. The 25-room Shingle-Style home was built in 1890 and heated by pipes connected to the E. Ingraham Company
- Welwyn, a Georgian-style mansion built in 1906 in Glen Cove, New York
