= 115th Street Library =

Library in Manhattan, New York

- New York Public Library
- U.S. National Register of Historic Places
- New York City Landmark
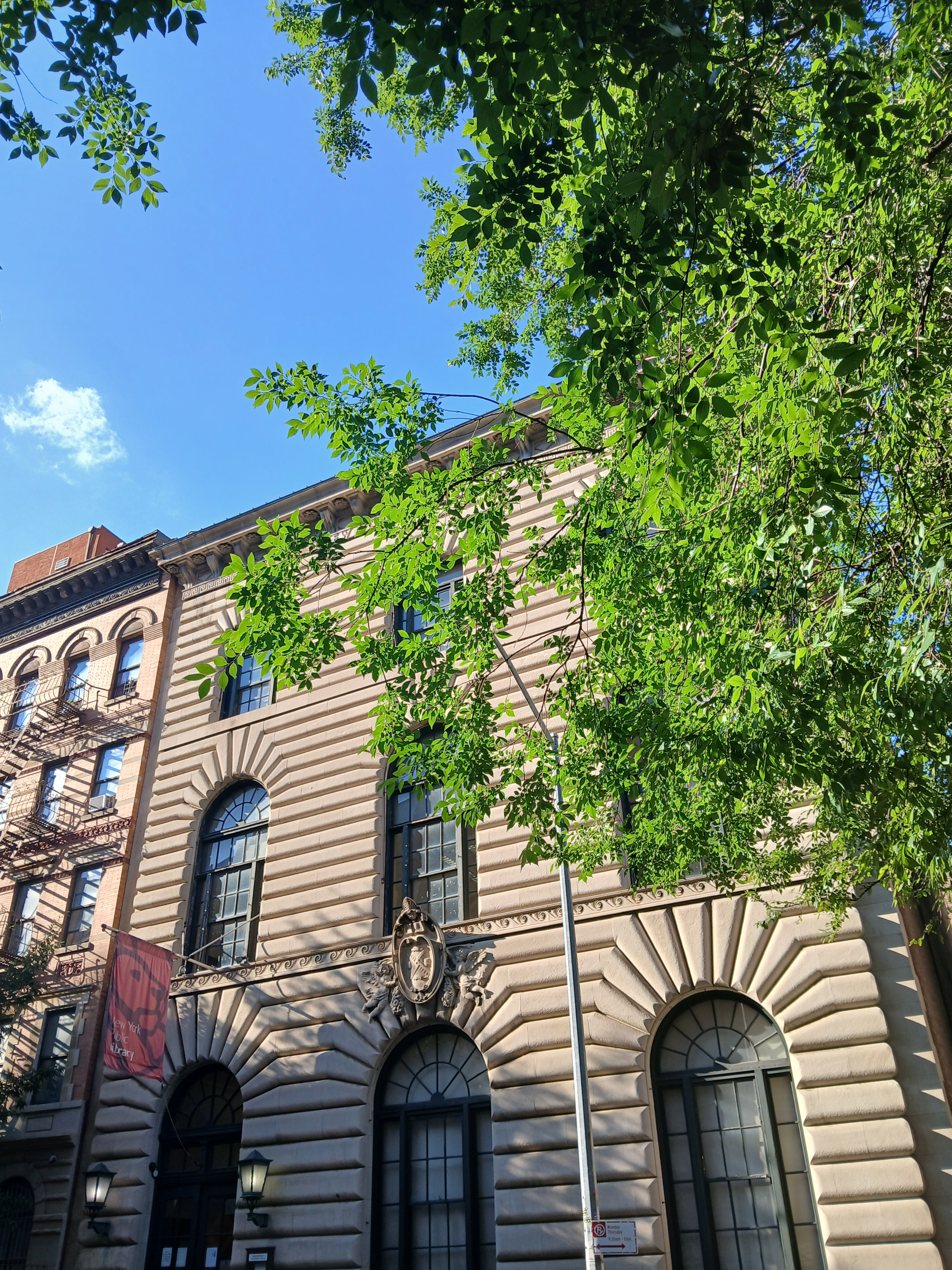
- Harry Belafonte 115th Street Library, July 2026
- Location: 203 W. 115th St., New York, New York
- Coordinates: 40°48′10″N 73°57′14″W
- Area: less than one acre
- Built: 1907
- Architect: McKim, Mead & White
- Architectural style: Late 19th And 20th Century Revivals, Neo Italian Renaissance
- NRHP reference No.: 80002704
- NYCL No.: 0298

Significant dates
- Added to NRHP: May 6, 1980
- Designated NYCL: July 12, 1967

The Harry Belafonte 115th Street Branch of the New York Public Library is a historic library building located in Harlem, New York City. It was designed by McKim, Mead & White and built in 1907–1908 and opened on November 6, 1908. It is a three-story-high, three-bay-wide building faced in deeply rusticated gray limestone in a Neo Italian Renaissance style. The branch was one of 65 built by the New York Public Library with funds provided by the philanthropist Andrew Carnegie, 11 of them designed by McKim, Mead & White. The building is 50 feet wide and features three evenly spaced arched openings on the first floor. The branch served as Harlem cultural center and hub of organizing efforts.

It was listed on the National Register of Historic Places in 1980. In 2017, the branch was renamed to honor Harry Belafonte who lived near the branch. Another branch of the Library, the Schomburg Center holds Belafonte's archives.

== See also ==
- List of New York City Designated Landmarks in Manhattan above 110th Street
- National Register of Historic Places listings in Manhattan above 110th Street
