= Ninth Square Historic District =

Historic district in Connecticut, United States

- U.S. National Register of Historic Places
- U.S. Historic district
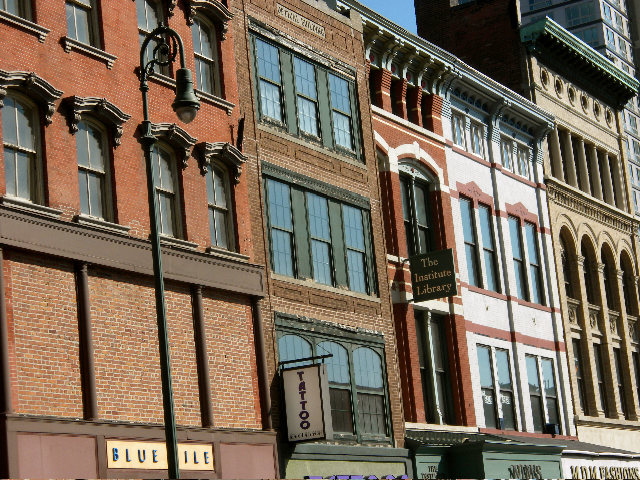
- Facades on Chapel Street between Church Street and Orange Street

- Location within Connecticut Location within the United States
- Location: Roughly bounded by Church, State, George, and Court Streets, New Haven, Connecticut
- Coordinates: 41°18′17″N 72°55′28″W
- Area: 18 acres (7.3 ha)
- Architectural style: Late 19th and 20th Century Revivals, Italianate, Greek Revival
- NRHP reference No.: 84001135
- Added to NRHP: May 3, 1984

The Ninth Square Historic District encompasses a historically diverse and well-preserved part of the commercial area of Downtown New Haven, Connecticut. The district is bounded by Church, Court, State, and Crown Streets, and is centered on the intersection of Chapel and Orange Streets. The buildings in the district are mostly late-19th and early 20th commercial buildings, and includes a number of commercial buildings from the first half of the 19th century, a rarity in most of Connecticut's urban downtown areas. The district was listed on the National Register of Historic Places in 1984.

Ninth Square takes its name from an early division of New Haven, when leaders of the New Haven Colony created a town plan of nine large squares in 1637, centered on the one now housing the New Haven Green. Because the ninth square was located closest to the colony's harbor, it was the first to develop a significant commercial presence. In the 1820s, the Farmington Canal was routed near the district, spurring further commercial development. The conversion of the canal right-of-way to railroad use intensified the area's commercial development in the second half of the 19th century. All of this resulted in a significant diversity of styles in the commercial buildings seen, generally reflecting architectural styles popular at the time of their construction. The area declined after World War II, but has been spared from destruction in urban renewal activities of the mid-20th century.

The Ninth Square has been at the center of New Haven's cultural renaissance, densification and renewal over the last decade.

== Businesses ==
Category	Business names
Education & Sharing Economy	A100, Grove, Grove Studios, Gateway Community College, Institute Library, MakeHaven, Project Storefronts, Strive
Entertainment	Barcade, CafeNine, Elm City Games, Firehouse 12
Galleries	Artspace
Retail	Artist and Craftsman Supply, Ecoworks, English Market, Sportspark
Coffee & Cafes	BNatural, Gcafe, Greenwell, Happy Lab
Housing	Residences at Ninth Square, 360 State Street
Knowledge Economy	Knight Architecture, SeeClickFix, svigals, Veoci, Square Nine Software, DataHaven, MEA Mobile, Patient Wisdom, IDriveYourCar.com, Ovote.com, BetterITS
Wellness	Balanced Yoga, Fresh Yoga
Restaurants	Pho N Spice, Skappo, Marco Polo, Miso, Tikkaway, Hunan House, 116 Crown, Meat & Co., Trinity

== Gallery ==
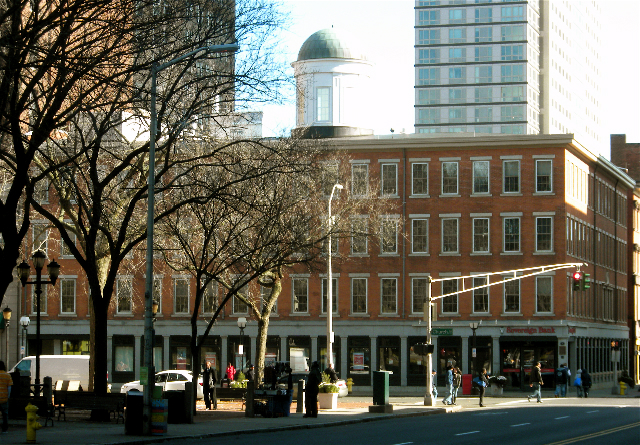
The Exchange (1832), Chapel and Church Streets, New Haven

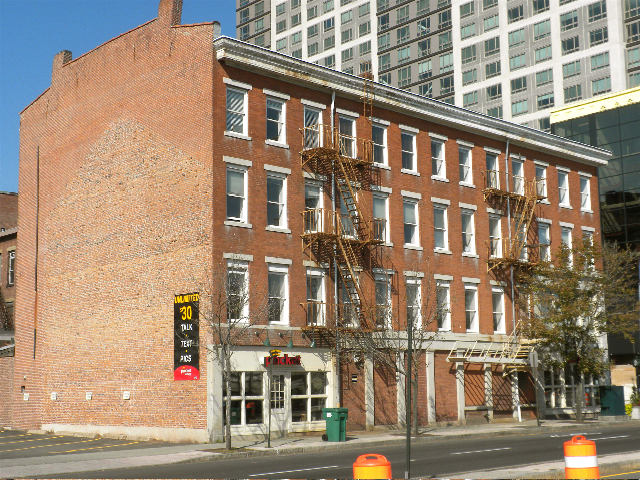
Street Building (1832), 742-750 Chapel Street

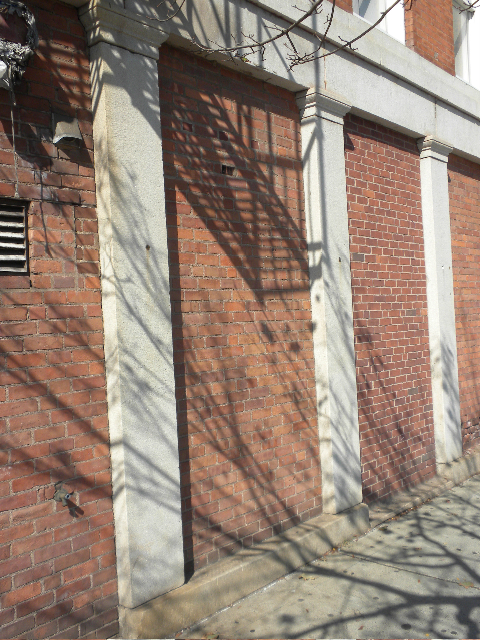
Street Building along State Street Monolithic granite piers with Doric capitals marking the original street storefronts.

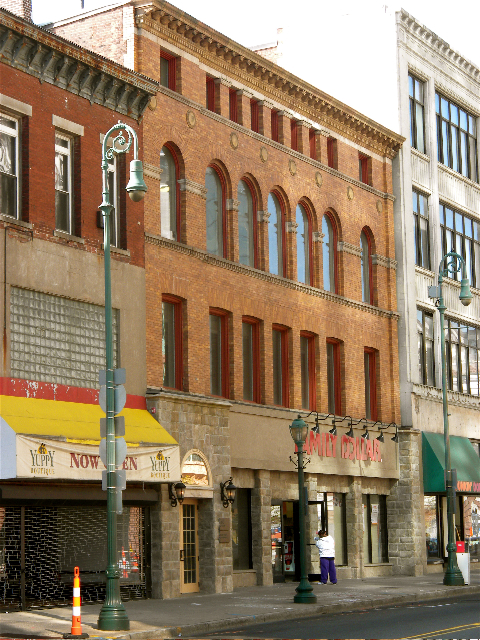
Monson Building (1891), 760 Chapel Street

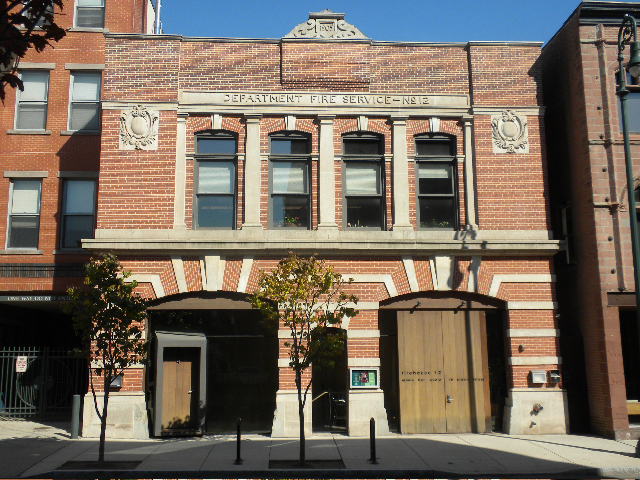
Fire House 12 (1905), 47 Crown Street

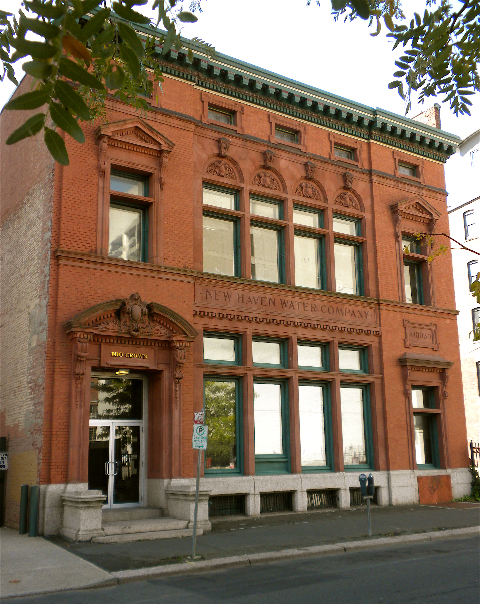
New Haven Water Company (1903), 100 Crown Street, Leoni Robinson.

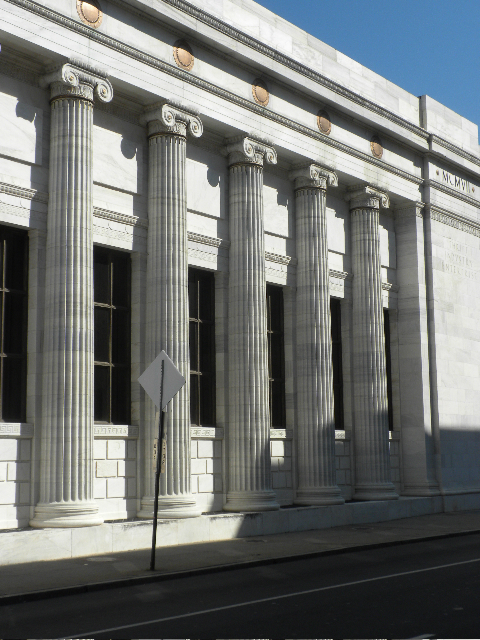
Connecticut Savings Bank (1906), 45 Church Street, Gordon, Tracy and Swartwout, New York.

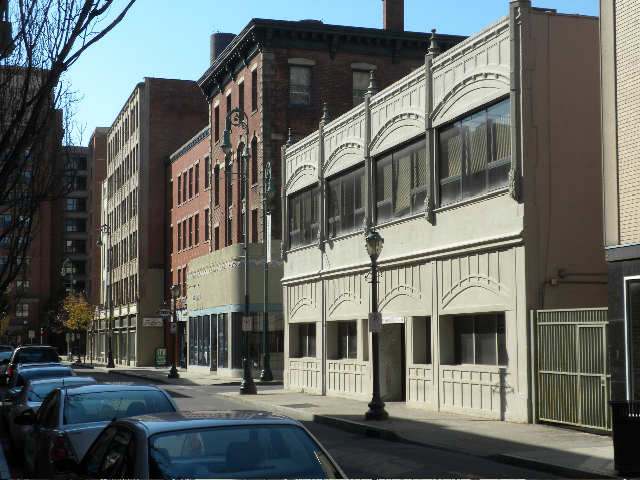
Orange Street from Center Street to Crown Street

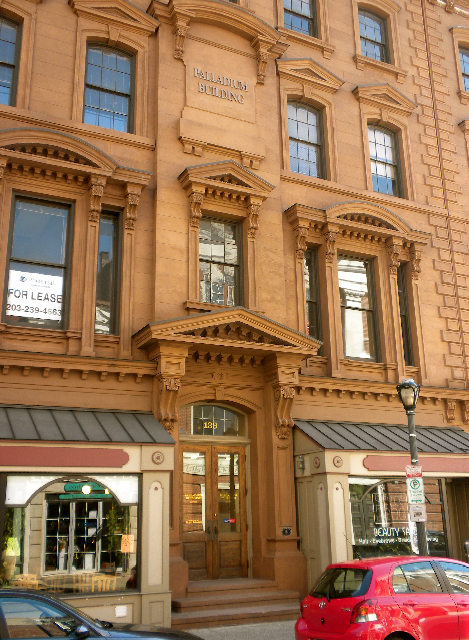
Young Men's Institute, later the Palladium Building, (1855), 139 Orange Street

== See also ==
- National Register of Historic Places listings in New Haven, Connecticut
