= William H. Allen (architect) =

American architect (1858–1936)

- Born: 1858
- Died: 1936 (aged 77–78)
- Occupation: Architect

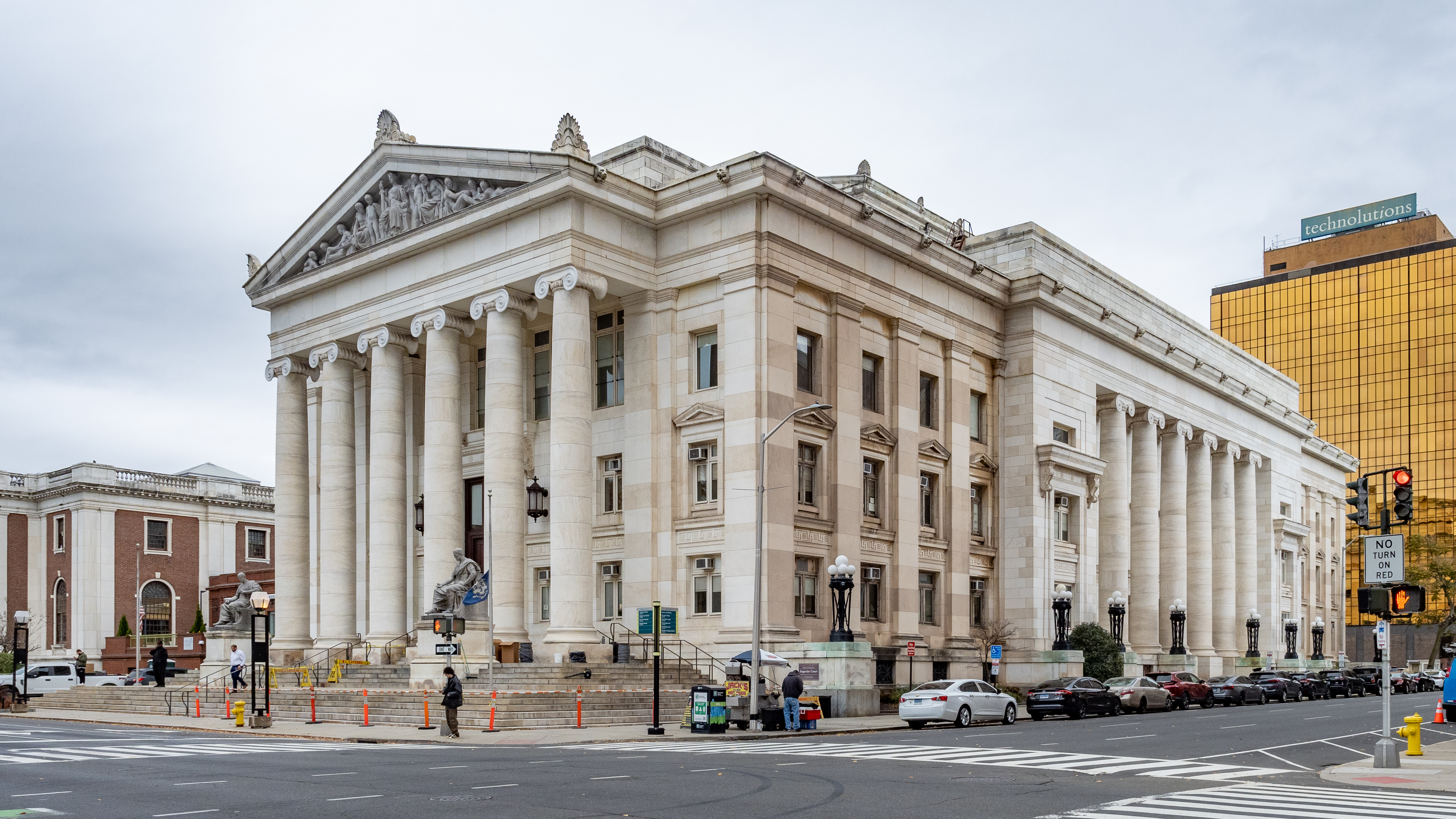
The New Haven County Courthouse, designed by Allen & Williams in the Neoclassical style and completed in 1914

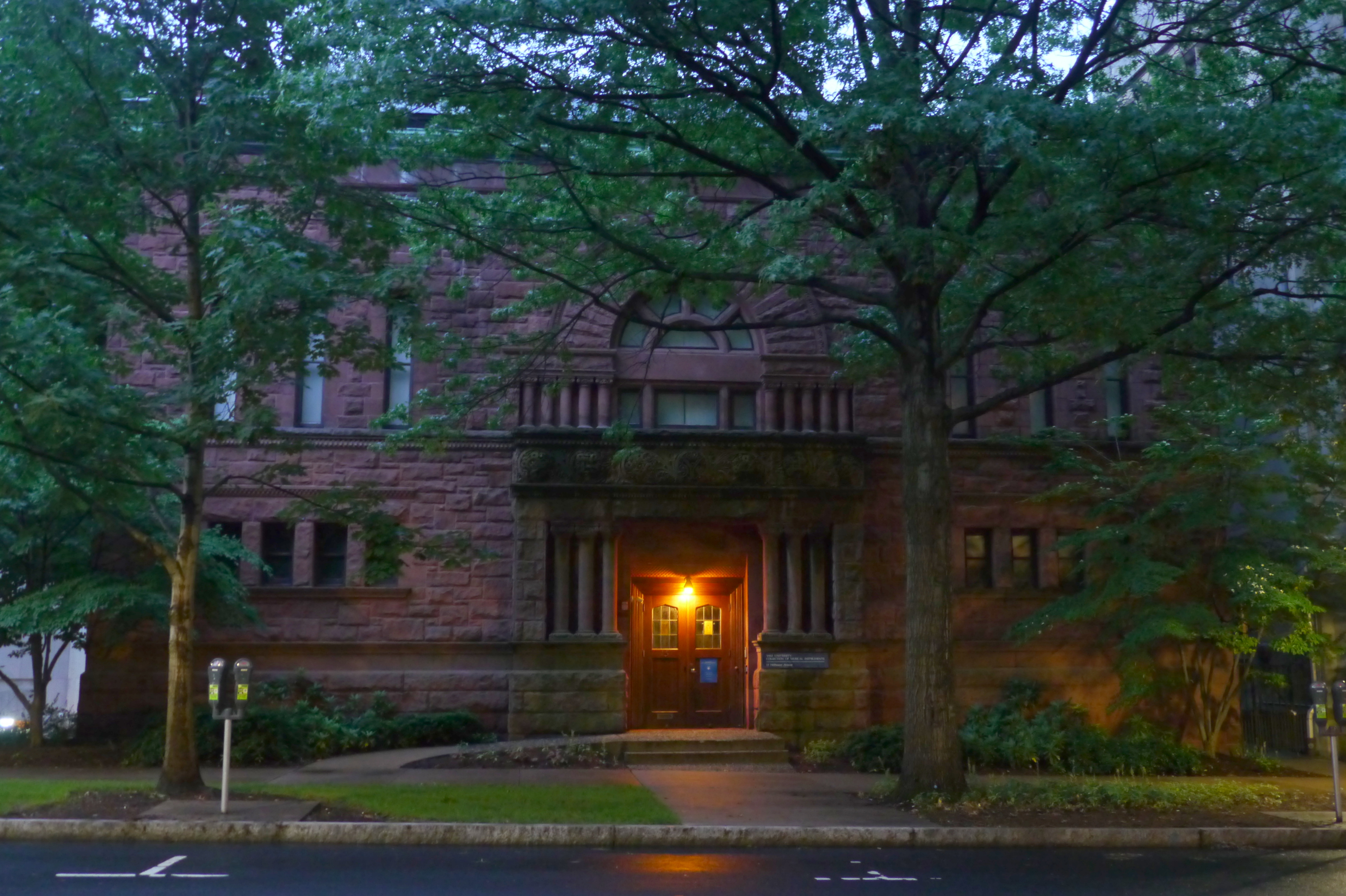
The former Alpha Delta Phi fraternity house in New Haven, designed by Allen in the Richardsonian Romanesque style and completed in 1895

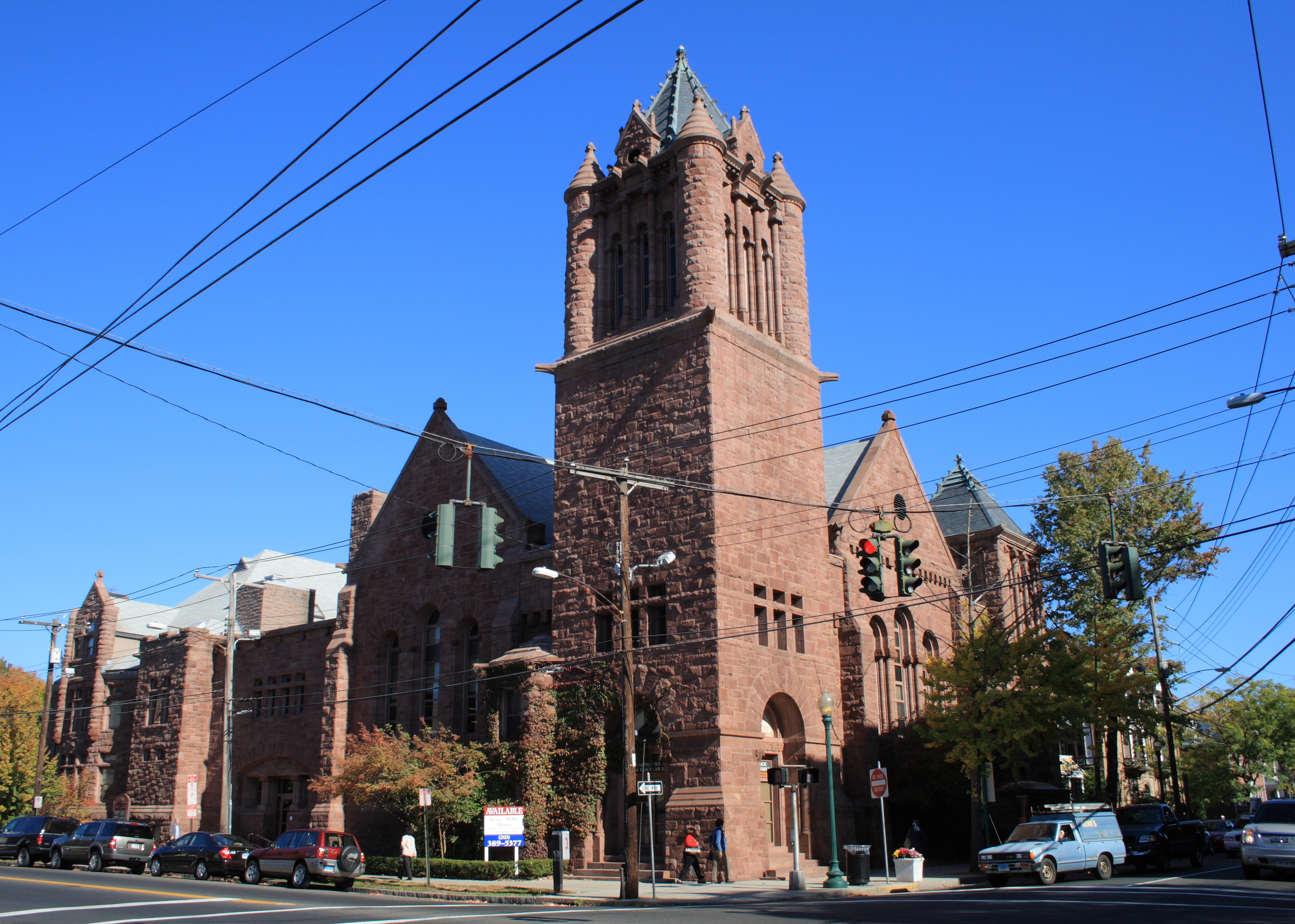
The former Plymouth Congregational Church in New Haven, designed by Allen in the Richardsonian Romanesque style and completed in 1901

William H. Allen (1858 – 1936) was an American architect who worked in New Haven, Connecticut, during the late nineteenth and early twentieth centuries. He designed hundreds of houses and other buildings.

== Life and career ==
William H. Allen was born in Northampton, Massachusetts, in 1858. In the late 1860s his family moved to New Haven, where he spent most of his adult life.

Allen began practice in 1886, when he formed the partnership of Allen & Tyler, architects, with Frank M. Tyler. Both had previously worked in the office of architect David R. Brown. Their larger works included the Simpson Block (1887) in Wallingford and the demolished Guilford Free Library (1891). After about five years the partnership was dissolved and Allen continued alone. In 1892 he began one of his largest projects, the general office building of the New York, New Haven and Hartford Railroad (1894). He also designed the former fraternity house of Alpha Delta Phi (1895), a bombastic Richardsonian Romanesque palazzo now home to the Yale University Collection of Musical Instruments. Allen was well known as an architect of single-family homes. The most notable of these is the Fyler-Hotchkiss House (1900) in Torrington, designed in the Châteauesque style popularized in the United States by Richard Morris Hunt. Contemporaneously with the Fyler house he designed the Richardsonian Romanesque former Plymouth Congregational Church (1901) in New Haven.

In 1901 Allen moved to Los Angeles. He sold his New Haven practice to Richard Williams, who had been his employee for eight years. In Los Angeles Allen designed the now-demolished Chamber of Commerce Building (1903), a Neoclassical office building. In 1905 he returned to New Haven and bought back part of his former firm from Williams, forming the partnership of Allen & Williams. This firm had the largest practice in New Haven before World War I.

Their largest project was the New Haven County Courthouse (1914) on the New Haven Green, a monumental Neoclassical building modeled on St George's Hall, Liverpool. They won this in a competition which drew significant criticism from the architectural profession. The county commissioners had chosen to conduct the competition against the best practices that had been developed by the American Institute of Architects (AIA), the most important of which was the employment of an impartial architectural advisor. Several prominent architects, including Cass Gilbert and Tracy & Swartwout, had been invited to participate, and all publicly refused. Only four architects, none of them AIA members, submitted proposals: Allen & Williams and Brown & von Beren of New Haven, Griggs & Hunt of Waterbury and Charles Scranton Palmer of Meriden. The commissioners eventually agreed to hire an advisor, Francis H. Kimball, who recommended the Allen & Williams proposal. The highlight of the building is its interior. Historian Elizabeth Mills Brown described it as "an astonishing spatial fantasy...[w]ith diagonal vistas, changes of height and sudden shafts of light, it is far more Piranesian than classical." The courthouse features an extensive sculptural program by J. Massey Rhind and murals by Gilbert White. While the courthouse project was just beginning they also completed the former New Haven County Temporary Home for Dependent and Neglected Children (1909), a Colonial Revival building which is now Maxcy Hall of the University of New Haven.

Allen & Williams dissolved their partnership in 1914, about the same time the courthouse was completed. Little is known of Allen's work after 1914. He died in New Hampshire in 1936.

Several of Allen and Allen & Williams' works are individually listed on the United States National Register of Historic Places (NRHP). Others are contributing buildings to New Haven's NRHP-listed Whitney Avenue Historic District and other historic districts.
