= Design New Haven =

Design New Haven, or "DNH Collaborative", is a civic organization focusing on Downtown New Haven, Connecticut. The group functions as a civic forum whose "mission is to promote dialogue on topics including economic development, architecture and design, transportation, livable streets, history, downtown events, and the Route 34 Corridor".

The group publishes coverage of economic development in New Haven. For example, its coverage of the response to a major request for qualifications issued to potential developers of the former New Haven Coliseum site featured photos and excerpts from each of the submitted proposals. The group also focuses on issues related to transportation, bicycling and walking, and comments at public meetings.
