= Chapel Street Historic District =

Historic district in Connecticut, United States

- U.S. National Register of Historic Places
- U.S. Historic district
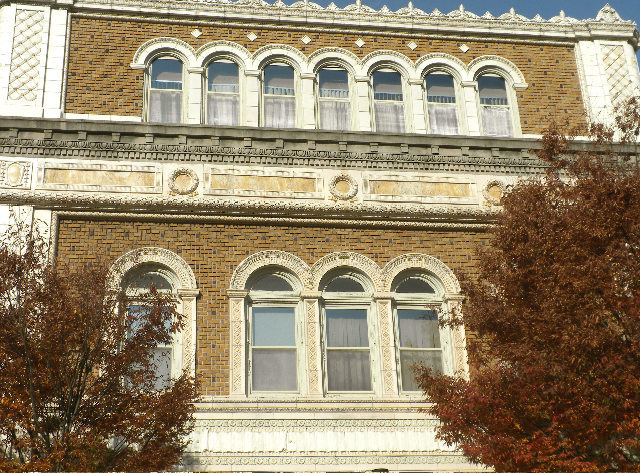
- 124 Temple Street (1909).

- Location within Connecticut Location within the United States
- Location: Roughly bounded by Park, Chapel, Temple, George, and Crown Streets, New Haven, Connecticut
- Coordinates: 41°18′20″N 72°55′47″W
- Area: 23 acres (9.3 ha)
- Architectural style: Late 19th and 20th Century Revivals, Late Victorian
- NRHP reference No.: 84001123
- Added to NRHP: April 5, 1984

The Chapel Street Historic District is a 23-acre (9.3 ha) historic district in the Downtown New Haven area of the city of New Haven, Connecticut. It was listed on the National Register of Historic Places in 1984. The district covers the southwestern corner of Downtown New Haven, including properties from Park Street to Temple Street between Chapel and Crown streets, and properties from High Street to Temple Street between George and Crown streets. It is bordered on the north by the New Haven Green and the Yale University campus. The western edge borders the Dwight Street Historic District. The eastern and southern edges of the district abut areas of more modern development.

In 1984 the district included, over a 5 and a half block area, 102 buildings, of which 76 were contributing buildings. The predominantly brick structures represent a wide range of architectural styles. Maps show that the area was residential in the eighteenth century and through the first quarter of the nineteenth century. Commercial development began to take over at that time, though residential properties remained well represented. The oldest building in the district is the Ira Atwater House, built in 1817. Most of the buildings now in the district were built in the late nineteenth and early twentieth centuries, having replaced earlier residential and commercial development. One of the oldest surviving commercial buildings in the city is a c. 1831 building on Church Street. There are three church buildings in the district, including the former Calvary Church Baptist Church (1871) which now house the Yale Repertory Theatre.

== Gallery ==
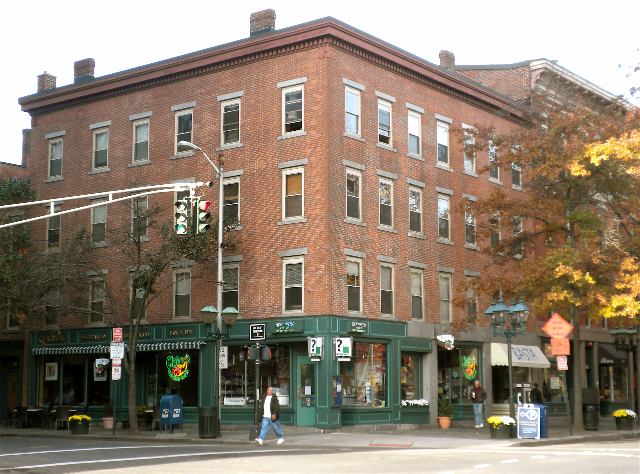
Townsend Block (about 1832), 100-1006 Chapel Street

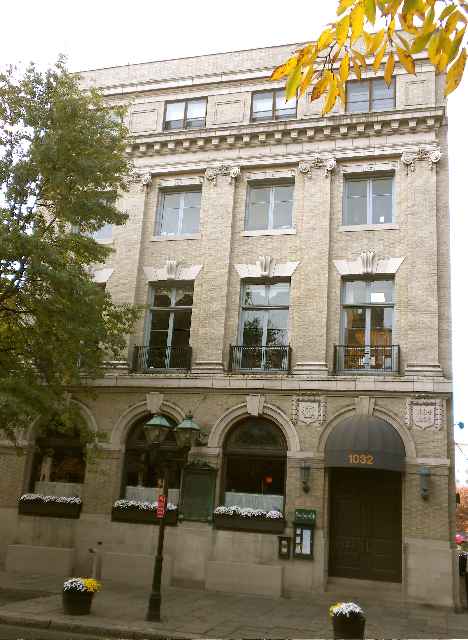
Union League Club (1902), 1032 Chapel Street, Richard Williams.

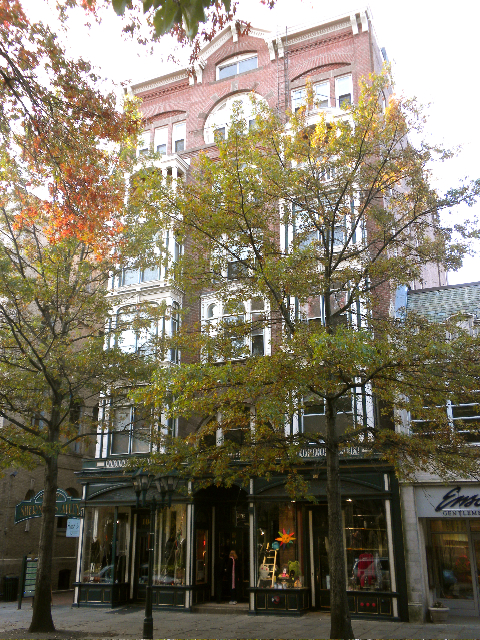
Warner Hall (1892), 1044 Chapel Street, Rufus G. Russell.

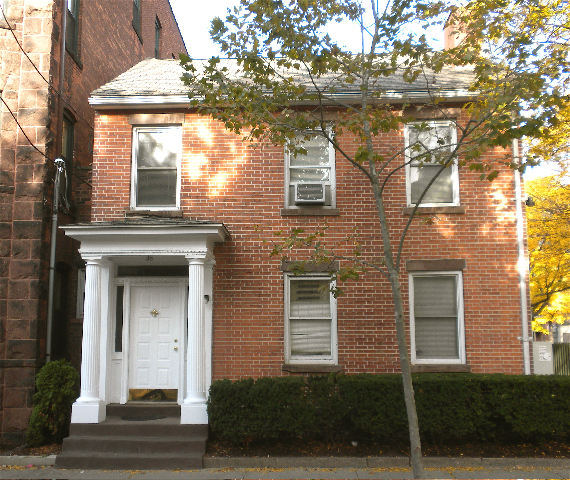
38 High Street (about 1840).

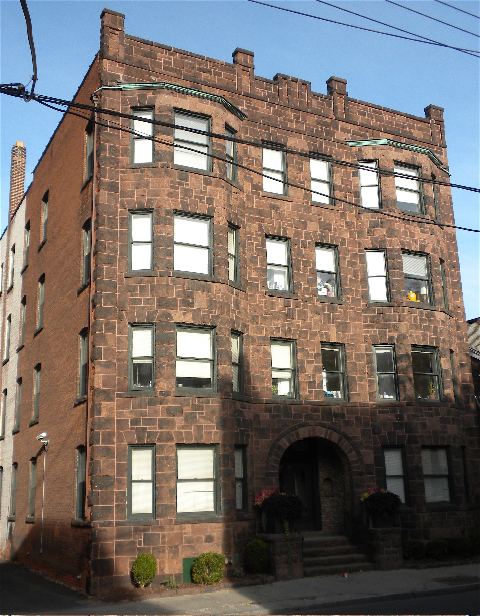
The Oxford (1910), 36 High Street, C. E. Joy.

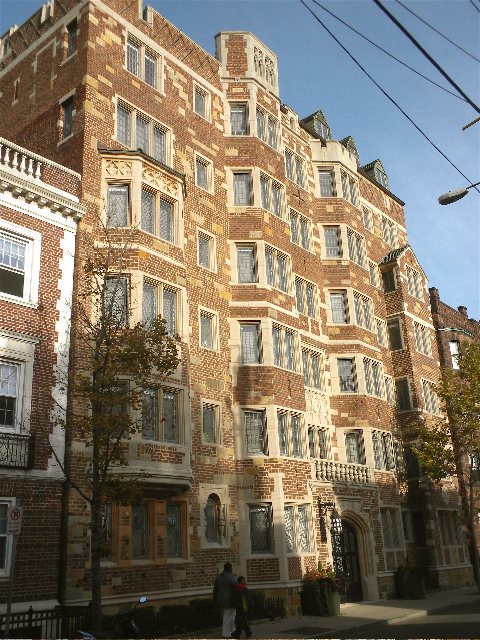
Cambridge Arms (1925), 32 High Street, Lester Julianelle.

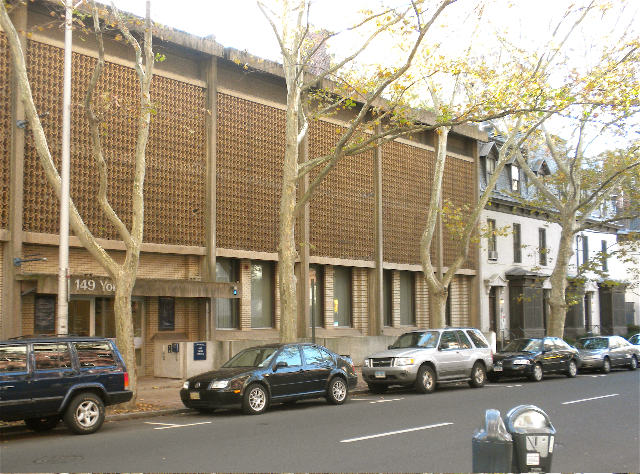
149 York Street

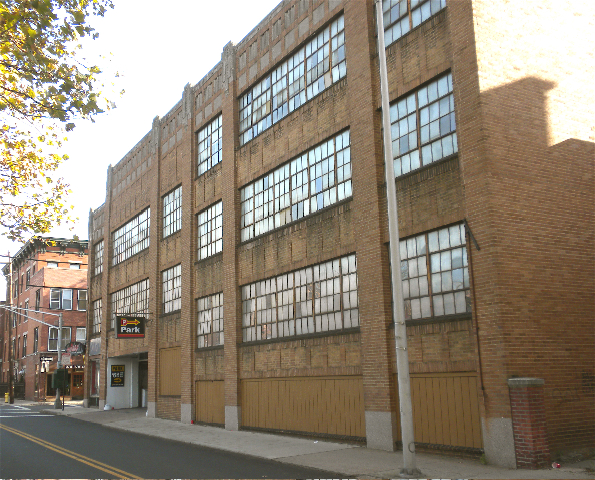
280 Crown Street

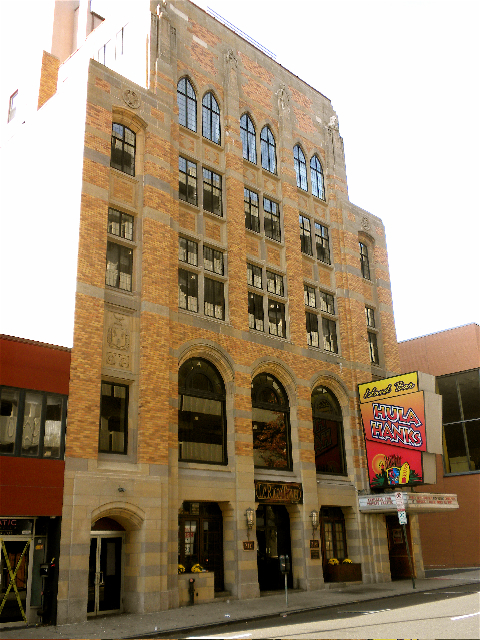
LoRicco Tower, 216 Crown Street

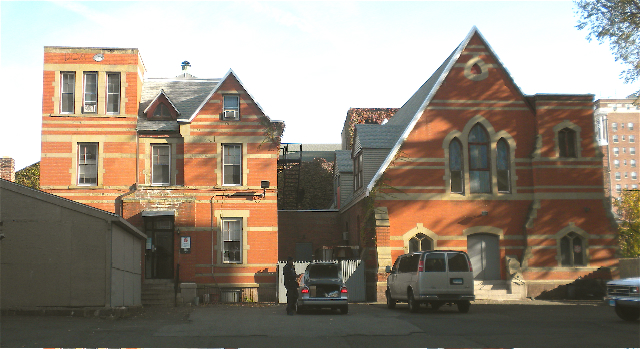
Trinity Church Home (1868), 303 George Street, Henry Austin.

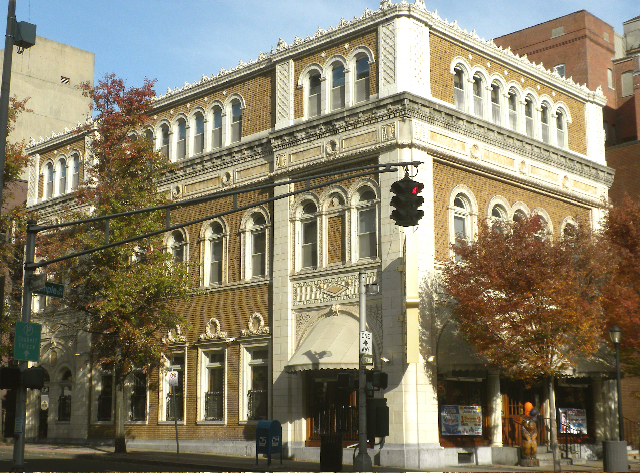
124 Temple Street (1909), R. W. Foote, Venetian palazzo.

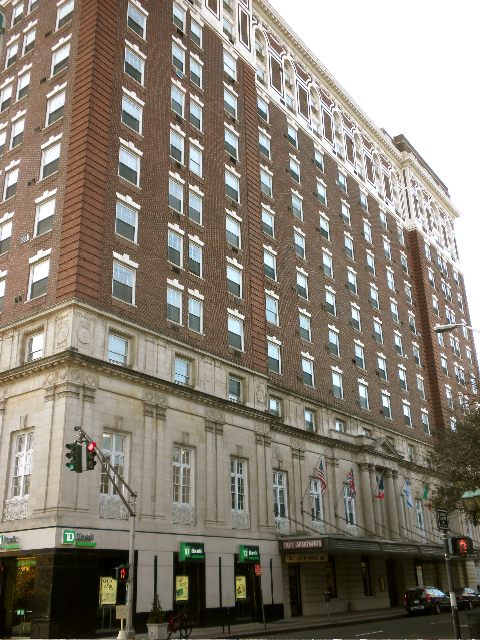
Taft Hotel (1911), 265 College Street, F. M. Andrews.

== See also ==
- National Register of Historic Places listings in New Haven, Connecticut
