= Plymouth Congregational Church (New Haven, Connecticut) =

Historic church in Connecticut, United States

- U.S. National Register of Historic Places
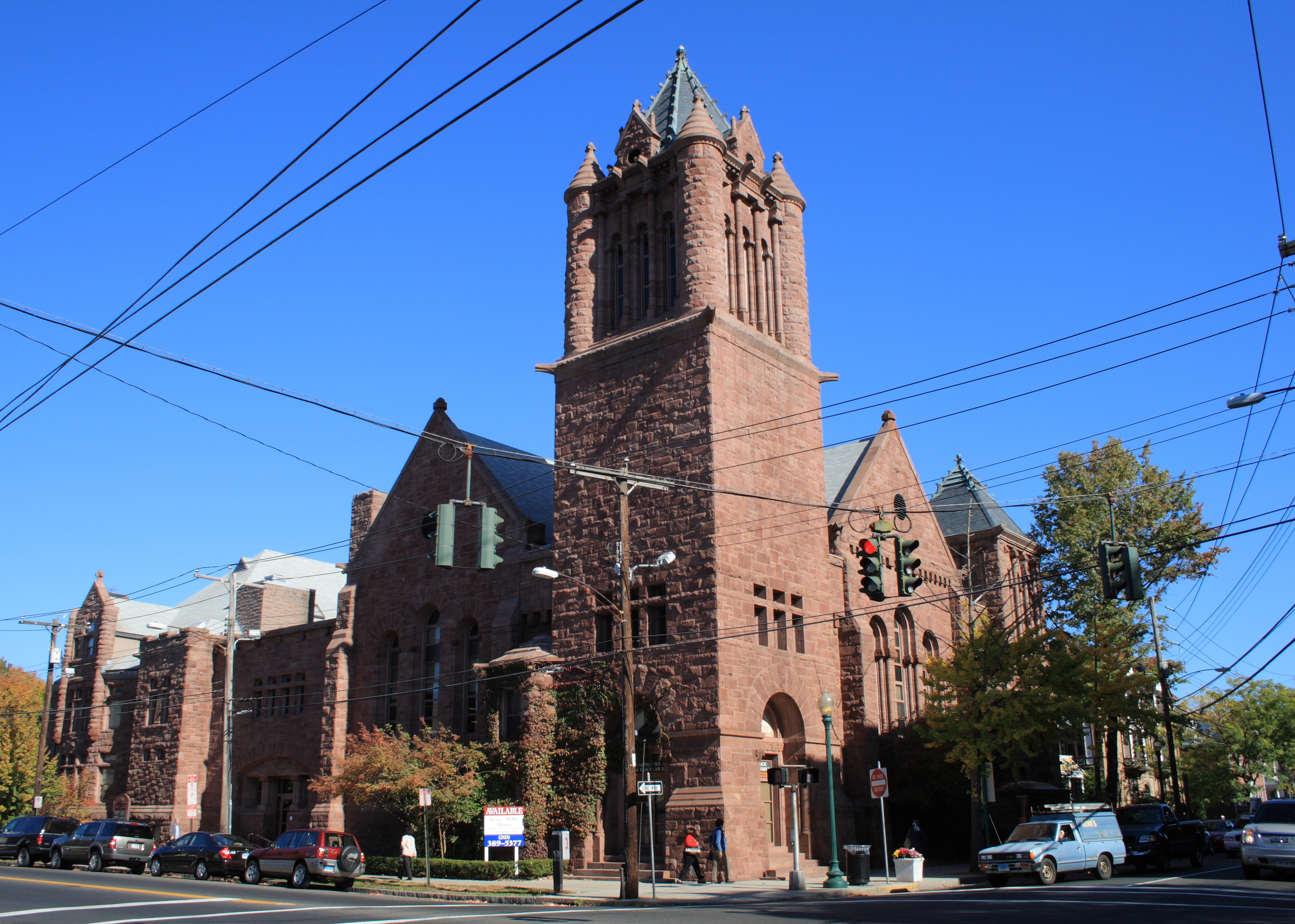

- Location within Connecticut Location within the United States
- Location: 1469 Chapel Street, New Haven, Connecticut
- Coordinates: 41°18′41″N 72°56′40″W
- Area: 1 acre (0.40 ha)
- Built: 1894
- Architect: William H. Allen; Sperry & Treat
- Architectural style: Romanesque, Richardsonian Romanesque
- NRHP reference No.: 83001250
- Added to NRHP: July 28, 1983

Plymouth Congregational Church, also known as Plymouth Church or Temple Keser Israel, is a former late-nineteenth-century Congregational Church at 1469 Chapel Street in New Haven, Connecticut. The church, a fine example of Romanesque Revival architecture, was listed on the National Register of Historic Places in 1983. The church is a notable example of an adaptive reuse, having been converted into a synagogue and medical office building.

== Description and history ==
The former Plymouth Congregational Church is located northwest of the New Haven Green in New Haven's Dwight neighborhood, at the northeast corner of Chapel and Sherman Streets. It is a large masonry structure, built out of brownstone with Romanesque Revival styling. The facade facing Church Street is historically its principal facade, with a gable flanked by square towers. The left tower is the taller of the two, with a turreted belfry level topped by a polygonal roof. Original main entrances are set in recesses at the base of this tower.

The congregation for which the church was built was founded in 1831 as the Missionary Church, and met in rented spaces until 1848, when its first edifice was built in College Street. The congregation acquired the present lot in 1884, and built in the early 1900s. It was formally renamed the Plymouth Congregational Church at this building's dedication in 1901. The congregation peaked in size in 1929, and declined after World War II. The building was sold to the Temple Kezar Jewish congregation in 1949, and the congregation was eventually merged into the Center Church on the Green. The building was converted for use as a Jewish synagogue, a role it fulfilled until 1968, when Temple Kezar merged with Temple Beth El and moved into a new building.

The building was abandoned and vacant for several years, inviting extensive vandalism and water damage. An initial attempt to convert the abandoned building into medical offices with the insertion of three floors and the complete destruction of any extant internal features was denied by the regional National Park Service office since the alterations would "… leave no area for perception of even part of the original. grand, open plan." Upon appeal, however, and a review of the damage already afflicted, the reuse was approved since the damage was seen to be beyond repair and the interior was gutted.

== See also ==
- National Register of Historic Places listings in New Haven, Connecticut
