= Chapel Square Mall =

Shopping mall in New Haven, Connecticut, U.S.

Coordinates: 41.3064°N 72.9257°W

- Location: New Haven, Connecticut
- Opened: 1967; 59 years ago
- Renovated: 1986
- Closed: 2002; 24 years ago
- Developer: The Rouse Company (1980s renovation)
- Num. of anchor tenants: 2
- Floor area: 165,000 sq ft (15,300 m^{2})
- Floors: 2

The Chapel Square Mall was a shopping mall in downtown New Haven, Connecticut. It was one of the first fully enclosed air-conditioned downtown malls in the United States; it has now been converted into apartments.

== History ==
=== Pre-construction and development ===
Originally proposed as part of the Church Street Redevelopment Project in 1957, after many plans and alterations, it opened in the 1960s. The mall was designed by New York architects Lathrop Douglas, with two levels and 165,000 square feet (15,300 m^{2}). It was anchored by two adjacent department stores: the New Haven-based Edw. Malley Co., (1962–1982) (which was relocated here from where Chapel Square's office tower and Omni Hotel are now located), and a large branch of New York City-based, Macy's, (1964–1993). Both were built at earlier stages in the development.

=== Renovations and decline ===
Despite ongoing criticism of the ravages of urban renewal, in particular the effects it had on New Haven, the mall was successful in stemming some of downtown's earlier retail decline. In fact, from the mid-1960s through to the mid-1980s, when nearby Connecticut Post Mall was greatly expanded, downtown New Haven remained the dominant regional retail draw. However, like similar projects of that era, it began to show signs of needing an update and a renovation, starting in the early 1980s.

In 1984, after Malley's closed, Chapel Square Mall and the office tower were sold to Baltimore-based The Rouse Company to revitalize the mall.

Rouse renovated Chapel Square by 1986, adding some new nationally known shops, a branch of the upmarket Conran's home goods chain, and a large second-level food court that overlooked the New Haven Green. The improvements, however, did not save the mall. They were short lived as a dramatic downturn in the economy, and Rouse failed to find a replacement tenant for the failed Edw. Malley Co. location.

The corporate bankruptcy and resulting closure of the R.H. Macy & Co. store and demise of the Conran's chain in 1993 took an immediate toll on the mall's viability. In 1995, management of the mall went to the New Haven Chamber of Commerce.

=== Redevelopment ===
In April 2002, the city of New Haven sold the mall and redevelopment rights to William, Jackson, Ewing, Inc. of Baltimore, known for successful urban retail and mixed-use projects such as Grand Central Terminal in New York City and Liberty Place Shops in Philadelphia. Frustration from not being able to acquire the adjacent vacant Macy's building, which was viewed by W. J. E. as necessary to making the project a large enough retail draw, allowed a partnering developer, David Nyberg of Acton, Massachusetts, and his partner Ronald Caplan, President of the PMC Group from Philadelphia, backed by the Luber Adler Real Estate Fund to take over the redevelopment. Reflecting developer Nyberg's and Caplan's strength, the mall was converted into a luxury apartment complex in 2003–2004 with part of the roof removed to create an interior courtyard. It is believed to be the first indoor shopping mall to be converted into apartments in the United States. Several spaces on the first floor were made into street-facing venues for retail and commercial use, and although they took a couple of years to lease out after the initial construction, now include stores such as Chipotle Mexican Grill, Boost Mobile, Rite Aid, and Ben & Jerry's, as well as several local, upscale restaurants, stores, and nightspots. This redevelopment of the mall property is partially credited with helping to revive other nearby sections of downtown.
