= The Edw. Malley Co. =

Department store in New Haven, Connecticut, U.S.

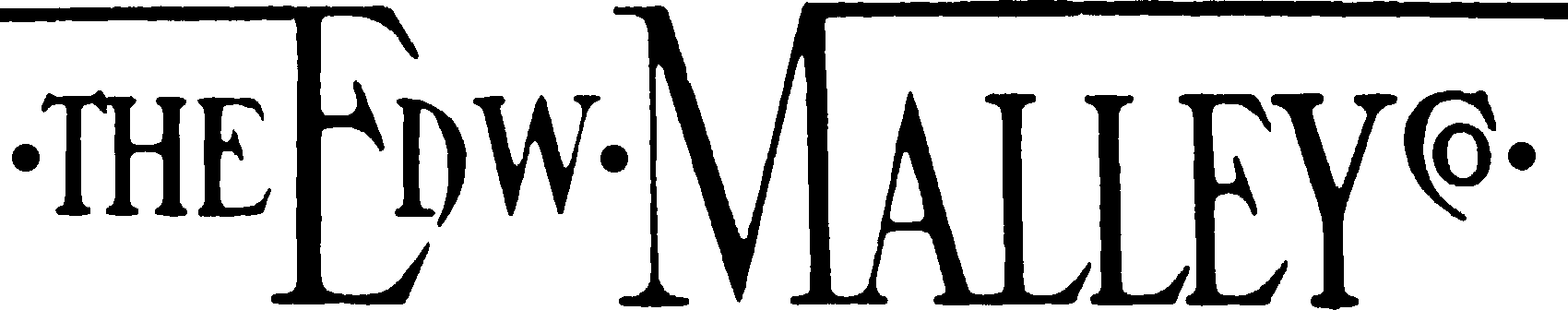
- Industry: Retail
- Founded: New Haven, Connecticut; 1852
- Defunct: 1982
- Fate: Bankruptcy
- Headquarters: New Haven, Connecticut
- Products: Clothing, housewares, books, patio furniture

The Edw. Malley Co., often abbreviated Malley's, was a prestigious department store in Downtown New Haven, Connecticut, from 1852 to 1982. Company produced postcards promoted the establishment as "The Metropolitan Store of Connecticut". In 2007, it was ranked among the "landmark consumer paradises" of New Haven's past, along with Macy's, Shartenberg's Department Store, and Grant's. The second site was regarded as "a crucial appendage" to the success of the Chapel Square Mall.

== History ==
=== Beginnings ===
In 1848, Edward Malley started displaying merchandise in the front room of his aunt Rhoda Mallory's house on North Front Street in Fair Haven. He traveled throughout New England, opening up stores briefly and then moving on.

=== Original site ===
The business started out as Malley & Co., a dry goods store, in 1852. It was originally located directly across from the New Haven Green, at 65 Chapel Street. Malley rented a 15- by 20-foot (6.1 m) store for $75 a year, using $250 in cash and a credit line of $550 to stock his store. With such limited space, Malley hung goods from wires strung across the room and used barrels topped with planks as counters. The store made deliveries by way of a mule named Maude who pulled a cart through the streets of New Haven.

By 1856, the premises had been "greatly enlarged", which Malley attributed to liberal advertising without regard to expense. It was described that October as "the largest and busiest store of its kind in the state". At that time, it employed about 100 people, had four show windows, a 75-foot (23 m) front, 120-foot (37 m) depth, and was three stories tall. The building was further improved in 1866. Malley partnered with one William Neeley, and changed the store to William Neeley Co. in 1868.

The store caught fire in 1875, and was completely destroyed by a second fire in 1882, with a loss estimated at $175,000.

The store was rebuilt, and in 1893, renamed Malley-Neeley Co.. The name was changed a final time to The Edw. Malley Co. in 1898, and enlarged in 1899 as a nine-story Beaux-Arts style building. It continued to remodel and improve, adding New England's first self-leveling elevator in 1923, and escalators in 1958. A 1938 travel book said of Malley's, "Young shoppers are fascinated by the big cage of live birds in the children's department."

It was demolished and relocated two blocks south at 2 Church Street when the now-defunct Chapel Square Mall was constructed on the original site in the early 1960s.

=== Second site ===
The second location, which opened October 25, 1962, measured 266,000 square feet and had three levels above ground and two below. It was connected by a walkway on the second floor to Macy's, across the street, which was, in turn, connected by bridge to the Chapel Square Mall, leading to the New Haven Green.

Churchstreeter clothing label

Features included a branch post office and a fix-it shop, a gourmet shop, bakery, 300-seat restaurant, beauty salon, photographic studio, jewelry and watch repair service, and shoe repair. Live radio could also be heard playing. During this period, Malley's offered its own brand of clothing called Churchstreeter.

Malley's brought its bird cage along to the second location. A former shopper wrote about the store's features: "Toys, Santa, Candy, a Soda Fountain, Fur Salon, Beauty Salon, Bridal Registry, but most importantly, on the 2nd floor, by the blue elevators, across from the Photo Studio and down the aisle from the Restaurant, in the Children's Shoe department was a big beautiful bird cage, about 8 feet tall and 4 feet wide."

With business doing well, The Edw. Malley Co. announced plans on March 18, 1970, to build its first branch store, a full-line department store in a proposed shopping mall in Hamden. The project was blocked by residents and nearby retailers, tied up in court for about a dozen years, then never built.

==== Decline ====
Malley's was a family business until 1971, when Edward Malley died, and it was sold to developer Roger L. Stevens, the man responsible for construction of the 1962 building. Urban parking garage stigma resulted from the 1973 murder of Penny Serra in the adjoining Temple Street parking garage, and area business declined. After that, the store was purchased in 1978 by The Outlet Company for $100 plus assumption of Malley's indebtedness.

In 1979, an outside retailer, Bargain Mart, began renting 3,456 square feet (321.1 m^{2}) of ground floor space from Malley's. Local businessman G. Harold Welch rented the building from 11 people who were collectively known as the Malley heirs. Though buying and selling the department store business, he retained control of the land and rented to The Outlet Company.

Malley's was sold again in 1980 to United Department Stores when The Outlet decided to focus only on broadcasting. UDS itself went bankrupt in 1981, resulting in the store's closure in February 1982. Malley's Auto Center and Bargain Mart remained open for several years after the store closed.

==== Post-closure ====
A court-ordered probate auction in November 1985 was given to high-bidder Mordecai Lipkis of Brooklyn, New York. After a search for tenants, Lipkis entered a partnership and made the purchase with Joseph Gindi and Ceasar Salama for $4.15 million plus $3.35 million on back taxes, improvements and carrying costs in December 1986.

New Haven planned to use the land as part of the aborted University Place mall. When the mall developers' offer to buy the property for $8.5 million didn't materialize, Lipkis fought a lengthy battle with the city to open an indoor flea market, Ceasar's Department Store. Ceasar's featured vendors at 140 out of 167 rented booths, including a Hyundai automobile dealership. The department store opened November 3, 1988, and closed in late April 1989.

Lipkis' further efforts to use the space included courting retailer ABC Carpet, and in 1992 proposing "New Haven Medical Center", a facility with physical therapy, urgent care, AIDS care, and an in vitro fertilization clinic. Still, the building remained empty, and in 1994 a water main burst on the third floor, causing extensive damage. This was followed by a fire in the adjacent abandoned Auto Center blamed on homeless people months later.

==== Demolition ====
The empty building was regarded as an eyesore, as it was the first thing visitors saw upon exiting the Route 34 Connector. A mural and assorted paintings were mounted over boarded up windows and other layers of graffiti. Stories were said to "abound of realtors, city officials and others showing off the city who found alternate routes into downtown just to avoid it." Indeed, it has been called a "black hole", a 'vacant carcass sitting at one of the most strategic corners of New Haven', symbolizing "blight and despair", and a "symbol of an empty past with no promises of the future."

Lipkis tried for years to force the city to pay him to settle a legal dispute over the building. In late 1997, he gave the building to the city upon dropping his lawsuit and receiving a $3.4 million settlement.

A final tour of the building revealed "mold-encrusted escalators" amid a "cool, musty, post-cataclysmic building" reminiscent of Beneath the Planet of the Apes. Demolition commenced in October, 1997. Over $160,000 was allotted for asbestos removal for the $3.247 million job.

In an effort to develop the property, Mayor John Daniels established a Retail Mall Advisory Council to explore the possibility of a Taubman Center. The city of New Haven directly courted Starter and IKEA. The Long Wharf Theatre was also considered for relocation to the spot, and a biotechnology research facility was another proposal. Gateway Community College opened a campus on the site in 2012.
