= Shartenberg's Department Store =

Department store in New Haven, Connecticut, U.S.

- Industry: Retail
- Founded: 1906
- Defunct: 1962
- Headquarters: New Haven, Connecticut

Shartenberg's Department Store was a six-floor department store located at 765-777 Chapel Street in Downtown New Haven, Connecticut, designed in the neoclassical style. In 2007, it was ranked among the "landmark consumer paradises" of New Haven's past, along with The Edw. Malley Co., Macy's, and Grant's.

== History ==
The department store began as A. C. Wilcox, (later called A. C. Wilcox & Company) a dry goods store, in 1836. After the death of A.C. Wilcox, it became The Howe & Stetson Co., and was greatly enlarged. In 1906, the business was purchased and became the Shartenberg-Robinson Department Store, and finally Shartenberg's Department Store.

The business was sold to Nelson Miller of New York in 1952 and closed its doors April 21, 1962.

The building was razed in either 1962 or 1964. The Shartenberg Site, as it came to be known, was used as a parking lot until 2008, when groundbreaking for the 31-story 360 State Street building commenced.
