= York Square Cinema =

Former art house cinema in Downtown New Haven, Connecticut

Coordinates: 41.3117°N 72.931°W

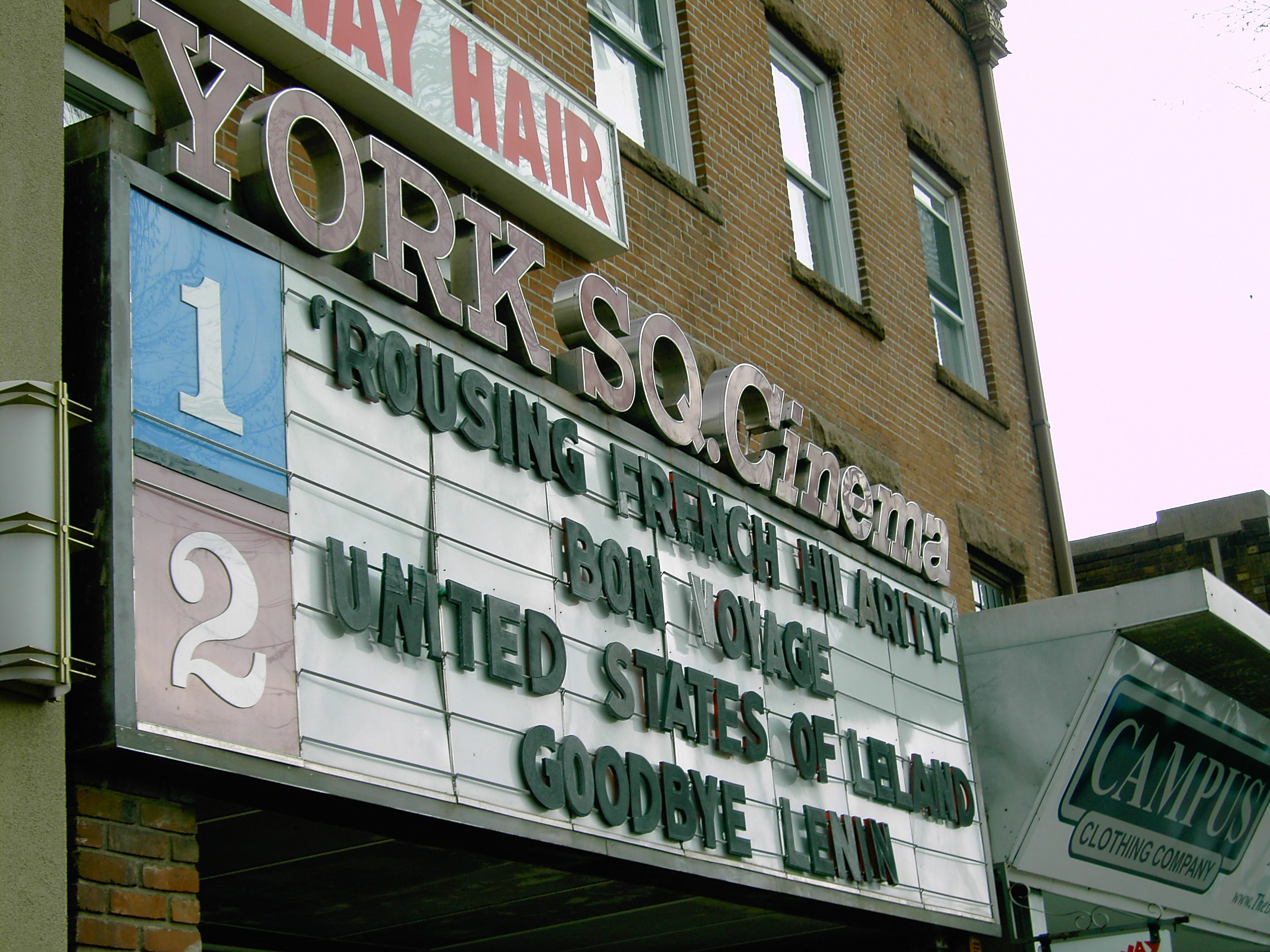
York Square Cinema

York Square Cinema (1970-2005) is a former art house cinema located in Downtown New Haven, Connecticut, USA. The York Square was built in 1970. It housed three separate movie theaters in a renovation that connected several old buildings. The York Square Cinemas was a business partnership between Leonard Sampson and Robert Spodick. The York Square was managed by Spodick sons Peter and Michael. The York Square held art exhibits and Film Festivals. They served RC Cola, Raisinettes, and popcorn. They would play classical music in the lobby. The York Square offered free Willoughby's Coffee for all patrons. There was free parking ticket validation stamps for movie patrons parked in the lot in the center of Broadway. The only live remaining owner, Robert Spodick, decided to close the doors of the York Square in July 2005 after several unsuccessful lawsuits with the large distribution chains.

The lawsuits concerned allegedly "unfair" and "unspoken" distribution agreements between the large movie distribution chains and the suburban cineplexes in the neighboring towns of Orange, North Haven, and Milford. Although many people suspect that the opening of Bowtie Partners Criterion Theater a few blocks away was cause for the York Square's closing, those who ran the York Square adamantly denied that the competitive theater had anything to do with the decision to close.

In their farewell letter, the York Square Management stated:

After 60 years of film exhibition in New Haven, I have decided to close the York Square. It’s been a good, long run, and we can happily reflect on our years of bringing to New Haven thousands of choices in the best in foreign and domestic film. We are no longer able to withstand the crushing pressure of the Showcase monopoly. We are simply not allowed to choose new films to play, and to upgrade and maintain our traditional relationship with our patrons. We have reached the point where we must say "Enough is enough."
