= Taft Hotel (New Haven) =

Former hotel in New Haven, Connecticut

Coordinates: 41.306862°N 72.928768°W

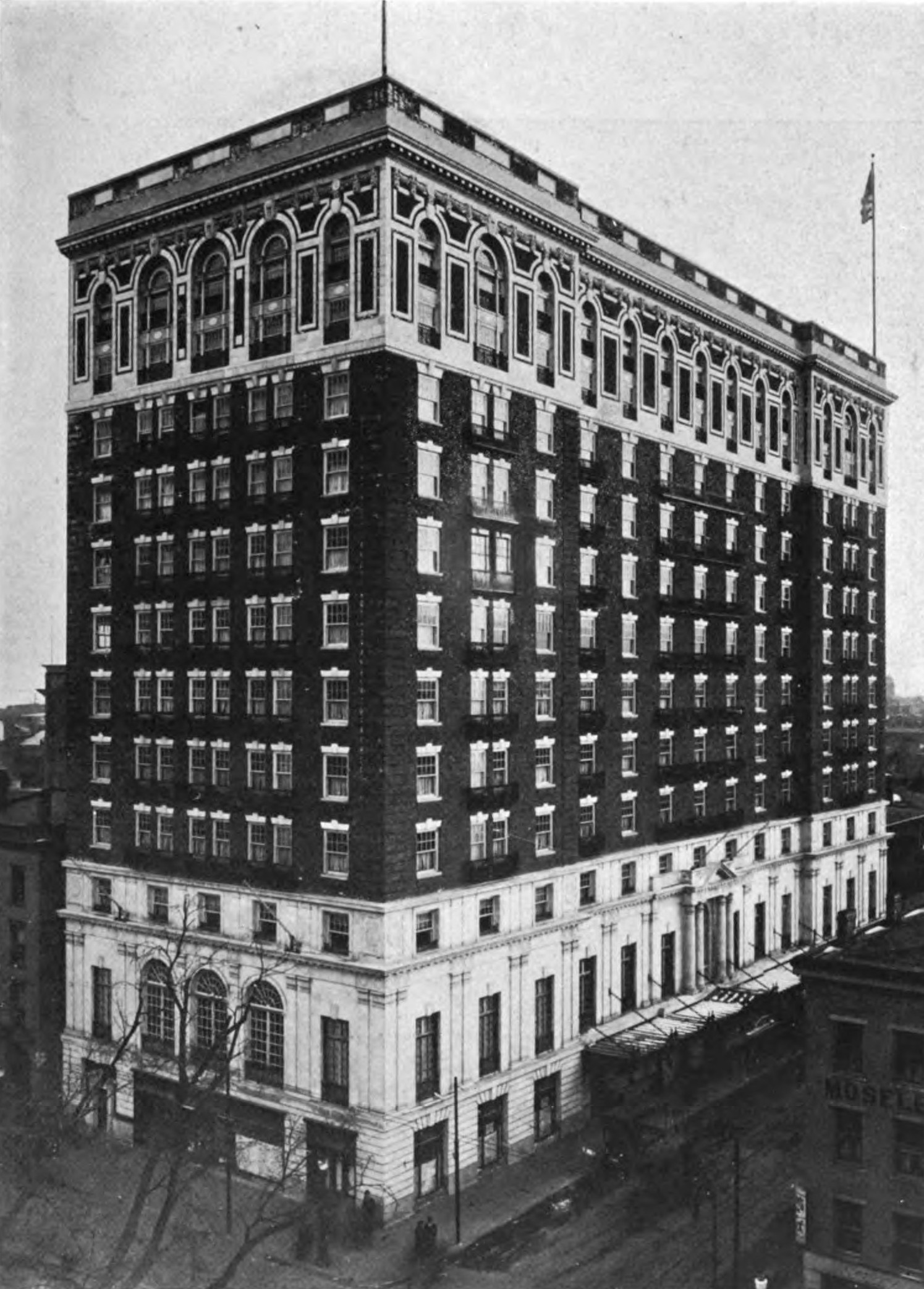
The Taft Hotel in 1912

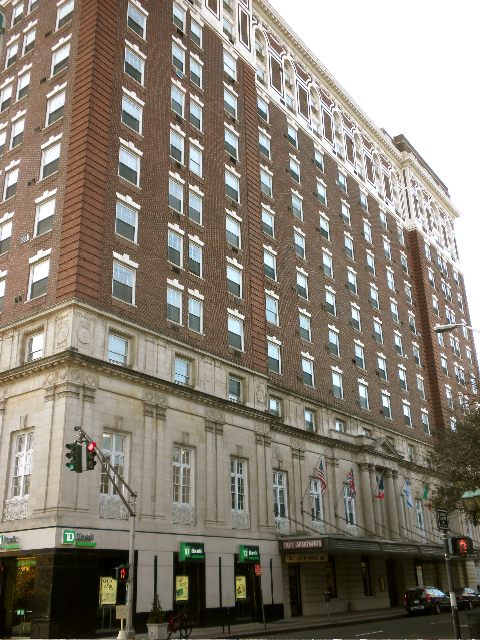
The building in 2010

The Taft Hotel is a former hotel at 265 College Street in New Haven, Connecticut. The building is still extant, primarily used for apartments. It is a contributing part of the Chapel Street Historic District, listed on the National Register of Historic Places. The building was designed by prolific architect Frank Mills Andrews.

The hotel building, completed in 1912, has twelve stories, and operated with 450 rooms. It sits on the corner of Chapel and College streets.

The building contains a bar, Bar Ordinary. The space is the oldest bar space in New Haven. The site hosted an ordinary or tavern as early as 1659, and hosted Benedict Arnold and George Washington. Abraham Lincoln and William Howard Taft may also have visited. In the 18th century it was called the Beers Tavern, then as the New Haven Hotel in the mid-19th century. In 1910, the Taft Hotel was built. By the 1980s, the hotel bar room became Richter's, owned by Yale graduate and crew instructor Richter Elser. The bar closed in 2011, replaced by Bar Ordinary in April 2013.

The Taft Hotel shutdown in 1973, in part due to competition from the modern Sheraton-Park Plaza (known as the Omni New Haven, as of 2022) that had opened a block away in 1970 as part of major urban renewal project in Downtown New Haven. The adjacent Adams Hotel, which had been built as an annex to the Taft, had closed some time earlier, although had been leased by the Culinary Institute of America for student housing until 1970. Zoning issues related to parking hampered early efforts to redevelop the Taft and Adams hotels into apartments. While the Taft was redeveloped, the Adams was acquired by the City of New Haven, and was demolished in 1980 to build a modern lobby addition to the historic Shubert New Haven theater building.

Taft Realty Associates began owning and managing the building in 1994, having purchased the building for $3.2 million. In 2022, the building was sold by Taft Realty Associates to an affiliate of Paredim Partners, an owner and manager of apartments, for $52.5 million.

== See also ==
- National Register of Historic Places listings in New Haven, Connecticut
