= William A. Borden =

American librarian

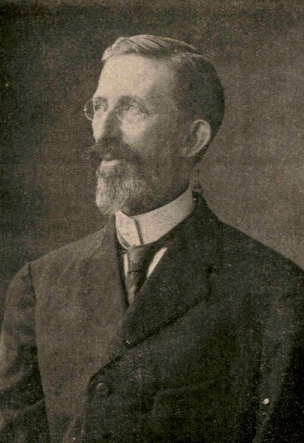

William Alanson Borden (4 April 1853 – 31 November 1931) was an American librarian and an organizer of city libraries in India who was an innovator of cataloguing systems. He was invited to Baroda by its ruler Sayajirao Gaekwad III who, impressed by the public libraries at New York, had invited him to organize a system of public libraries in Baroda which was a first for India.

== Life and work ==
Borden was born in New Bedford to magistrate Allanson who worked in the Third District Court of Bristol (MA) and Mary née Topham. He studied at a public school in New Bedford before going to study science at Cornell University from 1870 to 1874. He then worked for sometime with a binding shop and then at the Boston Athenaeum Library in 1883 where he worked with Charles Cutter. He designed what has been called the Boston Athenaeum Newspaper File to hold newspapers. In 1886 he was involved with Reynolds Library at Rochester. Borden served as Librarian of the Young Men's Institute Library from 1887-1894 and 1897-1910, where his classification system continues to be utilized. He gave lectures at the Columbia College School of Library Economy, founded by Melvil Dewey. In 1890-91 he was involved in improving the classification developed by Dewey which extended methods to deal with photographs. In 1891 he founded the Connecticut Library Association. In 1910 he was invited to Baroda by the Maharaja to organize a system of 400 public libraries. He was designated as Director of Libraries. The appointment was given by C.N. Seddon, Dewan for the Maharaja, communicated through H.C. Bumpus of the American Museum of Natural History. Borden had to stop over in London where he met Sayajirao. His initial term was for two years but it was extended to another two years. Borden was paid Rs 1020 per month with an increment of Rs 250 per month after the first year (at that time about $3000 per year). His wife and family joined briefly but left due to the climate. In 1913 he ran a librarian's training workshop in Baroda. Borden returned to the US and retired to Morris Cove where he lived until his death. He loved sailing and was a Commodore of the Pequot Club. He was married to Hope Lewis, daughter of Rev. A.N. Lewis of Westport and they had a son, Lewis Alanson and an adopted daughter.

Borden was also an innovative engineer who designed a steel bookstack and a newspaper file that was widely used in the US. The newspaper file was called the Athenaeum Newspaper File and consisted of a central stick surrounded by 7 smaller sticks to hold newspapers. His steel cantilever book stacks were produced and installed by Post & McCord of New York City. While in India, he also took an interest in missionary activities, noting the inefficiency of Christian conversions.
