= The Institute Library (New Haven) =

Coordinates: 41.3059°N 72.9252°W

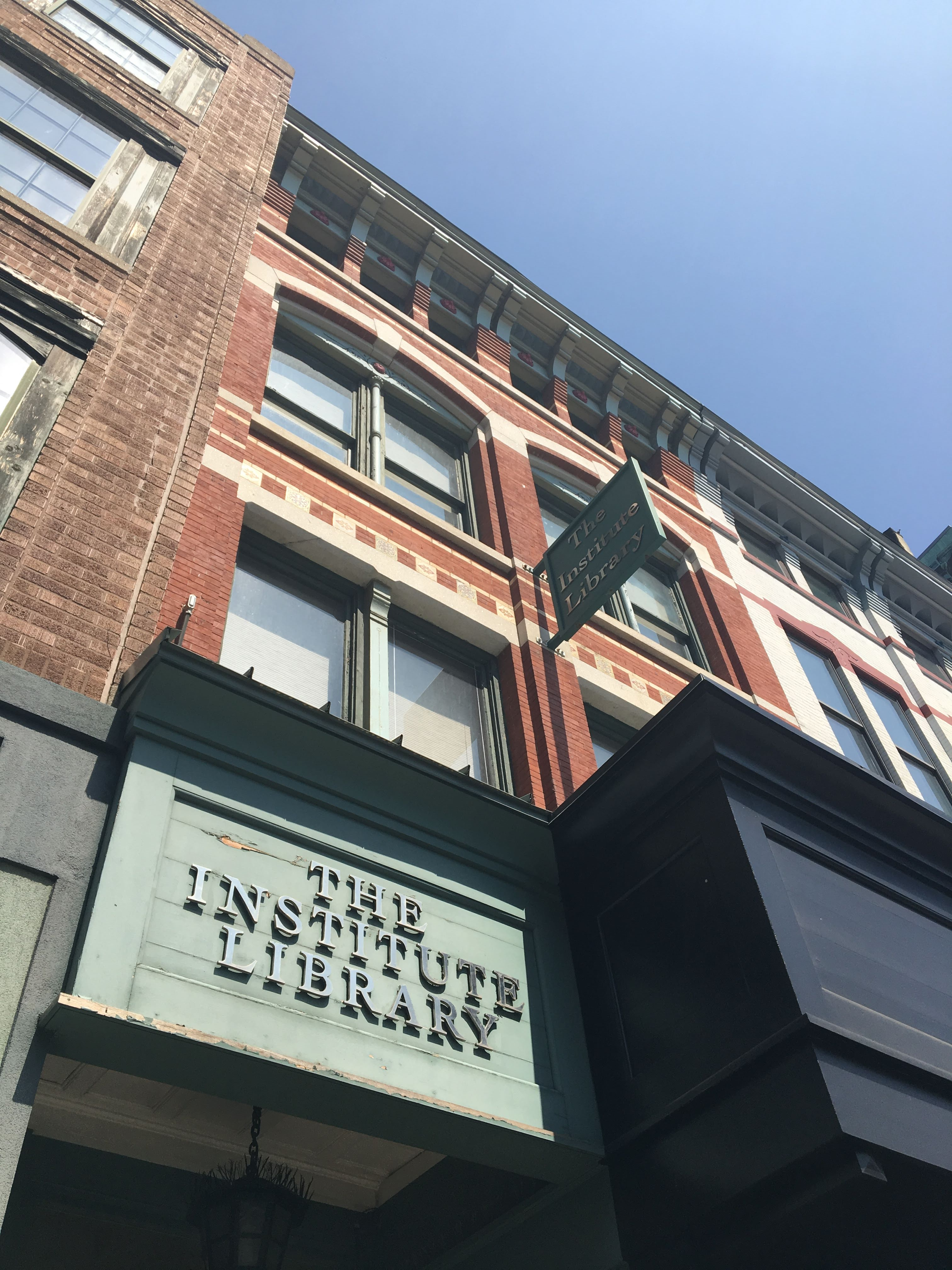
The Institute Library in New Haven, Connecticut

The Institute Library (originally established as the New Haven Young Men's Institute, and sometimes called the Young Men's Institute Library) is a membership library in New Haven, Connecticut. Founded in 1826 in the tradition of Mechanics' Institutes, it is New Haven's oldest community library and one of the few membership libraries now remaining in North America. The organization was particularly active during the 19th century as a center for lectures, debates, and classes in New Haven.

== History ==
The Institute Library was born out of the Apprentices' Literary Association, and thusly named. Founded in August 1826, this association organized as an educational society and declared as its mission the "mutual assistance in the attainment of useful knowledge." It promoted this mission through a collection of books amassed by the initial group of eight members and the scheduling of regular meetings of the membership.

The Association drew the interest of local educators. A year after founding, classes, alongside readings and debates, were regularly featured. In 1828 the name was changed to The Young Mechanics' Institute. In 1832 lectures were delivered on the following topics: "on mechanical inventions and improvement, by a carpenter; on bibliography, by a printer; on hydrostatics, by a blacksmith; on steam, by a machinist; on vegetable chemistry, by a coachmaker; on mechanical powers, by a machinist." In 1835, the Association permitted women to join. In 1841, the organization renamed itself as The New Haven Young Men's Institute. Also in 1841 the Institute acquired the collection of the Social Library Co. and the property of the New Haven Athenaeum. A center of adult education, literary discussion, and civil discourse throughout much of the 19th century, it stood as the largest circulating library in the city and the site of popular lecture series. Speakers at the Institute included Henry Ward Beecher, Ralph Waldo Emerson and Herman Melville in 1857 alone. Other speakers include Frederick Douglass and Anna E. Dickinson. In 1878, the Institute Library, as it came to be called by its membership, relocated to its current location at 847 Chapel Street in New Haven, Connecticut.

In the founding year of 1826, the Library counted 8 members and in 1851 the Library counted 660 members. In 1828 the Library had 65 volumes in the collection and in 1851 the Library held 5000 volumes. In 1889 the number of volumes increased to 15,000.

For much of its history, the concept of the free public library was unknown and the Institute Library served as a substitute, something commonly done in many cities of the time. In 1887, the New Haven Free Public Library was established, transforming the Institute Library's focus and mission. Librarian William A. Borden in the years that followed took the opportunity to experiment with new library technologies and practices with collections housed at the Institute Library; stating "[T]he Institute, again looking to the future, had become specialized in English and American literature and in biography and travel, and had taken its position as the literary, rather than the educational, headquarters of the city." Borden formulated a new classification system for the library's collection, which is currently used to classify materials.

The Institute Library had multiple locations between founding and 1878, when it moved to its current building on Chapel Street. Prior locations include the Glebe building, the Phoenix Building, the Leffingwell Building, the Palladium building (originally known at the Institute Building).

== Present day ==
After a long period of decline in membership and activity, the library began a period of reengagement with the New Haven community in 2011 and now hosts and sponsors various programs in the arts and humanities. In February of that year, the library hired its first executive director and embarked on a series of major repairs and renovations to the historical building in which the library is housed. In 2011, the executive director of the Institute Library received the Arts Award from the Arts Council of Greater New Haven for his revitalization efforts. The third floor of the building features a gallery space with rotating art shows featuring local artists.
