= Leila Daw =

American installation artist and art professor

Leila Daw (born 1940) is an American installation artist and art professor; her work uses diverse materials to explore themes of cartography and feminism.

== Life and work ==
Leila Daw received her Masters of Fine Arts from the St. Louis School of Fine Arts at Washington University, and her Bachelor of Arts from Wellesley College in Wellesley, Massachusetts. She was a professor of art from 1974 through 1976 at Tusculum College, Maryville College, and Forest Park Community College, from 1976 through 1990 at Southern Illinois University, and from 1990 to 2002 at the Massachusetts College of Art. In 2002 she retired from teaching to become a full-time artist.

Daw's works include permanent installations at the Bradley International Airport and the New Haven Free Public Library; she has also participated in group exhibits at the Contemporary Arts Center and the Massachusetts Museum of Contemporary Art. Daw was one of a group of artists who took part in the design of the St. Louis MetroLink light rail system, and she became a member of the MetroLink project management team. Her work Red River (1991) at Centenary College of Louisiana, a pattern of wildflowers in a public lawn, is imbued with symbolism of menstruation and menopause. Art by Daw originally commissioned for the Massachusetts Turnpike – a set of steel park benches painted to look like oversized folded paper maps – is on exhibit at the DeCordova Museum in Lincoln, Massachusetts. Other works of Daw have been more ephemeral: her Pre-Historic River Channel (1981), for instance, used skywriting to map the course of the Mississippi River at an earlier age when it bypassed the current location of St. Louis.

Over the years, Daw has incorporated a great diversity of materials into her work. As Joanna Frueh writes, "Since the early 1980s she has used acrylic, pencil, bronzing powders, metal leaf, Mylar, foil, and other mixed media on paper and canvas in order to create maps that replicate the terrain in regions where she has lived – St. Louis and Boston – and traveled, by car, plane, and imagination, such as the American desert West."
