= New Haven County Courthouse =

- U.S. National Register of Historic Places
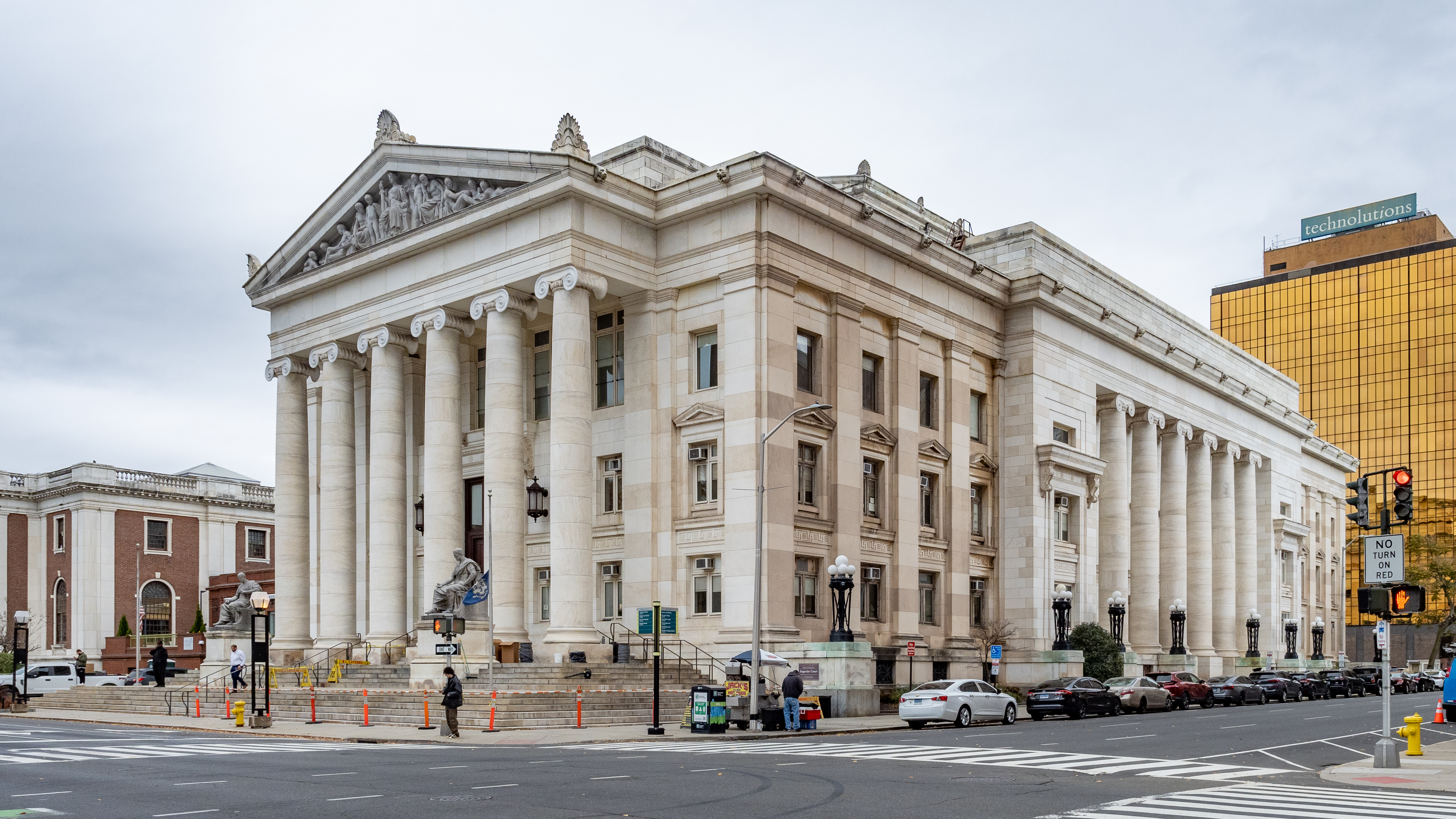
- (2024)

- Location within Connecticut Location within the United States
- Location: 121 Elm Street, New Haven, Connecticut
- Coordinates: 41°18′32″N 72°55′27″W
- Area: 1.2 acres (0.49 ha)
- Built: 1917
- Architect: Allen and Williams
- Architectural style: Beaux Arts, Classical Revival
- NRHP reference No.: 03000404
- Added to NRHP: May 16, 2003

The New Haven County Courthouse is located at 121 Elm Street in the Downtown section of New Haven, Connecticut. The building was built in 1917 and was added to the National Register of Historic Places on May 16, 2003. It is one of the city's finest examples of Beaux Arts architecture, with a particularly elaborate central atrium, and was the site of Griswold v. Connecticut, a historic court case involving women's right to birth control.

== Description and history ==
The New Haven County Courthouse is located in downtown New Haven, facing the New Haven Green from the northwest corner of Elm and Church Streets, It is a three-story stone structure, finished in white Vermont marble. Its principal mass is basically rectangular, with projecting sections of differing depths on each side. The two street-facing projections house its main entrances, which are fronted by Ionic porticos. A central section rises a full extra story to provide additional height to the central atrium. The interior is finished in richly ornamented finishes of marble, mahogany, brass, and plaster. Some doors have heavy brass knobs bearing the county seal.

The courthouse was designed by William H. Allen and Richard Williams. Their Beaux Arts architecture design won a design competition over submissions from several well-known architects, and contributed to the city's adoption of the City Beautiful movement to improve its public spaces and facilities. The building was under threat of demolition in 1956. The building's exterior underwent a $10.5 million renovation project, with work beginning in January 2013.

Significant court cases tried at the courthouse include Griswold v. Connecticut, which ensured that married women could have access to birth control methods and information, and the trial of Black Panther Bobby Seale.

The sculpture in the courthouse's front was executed by J. Massey Rhind. The figures in Rhind's tympanum are Justice, Victory, Precedence, Accuracy, Common Law, Statutory Law, Progress and Commerce. Unobtrusive netting is installed across the tympanum to prevent hawks from nesting there, as the birds have done in the past.

== See also ==
- National Register of Historic Places listings in New Haven, Connecticut
