= Claire's Corner Copia =

Vegetarian restaurant in New Haven, Connecticut, U.S.

Coordinates: 41°18′26.1″N 72°55′44.0″W

Claire's Corner Copia is a kosher vegetarian restaurant in New Haven, Connecticut. It is located at 1000 Chapel Street near the campus of Yale University and the New Haven Green. It is owned by chef Claire Criscuolo, and was formerly co-owned with her late husband Frank Criscuolo. The couple used Claire Criscuolo's engagement ring as collateral for the loan they needed to open the restaurant.

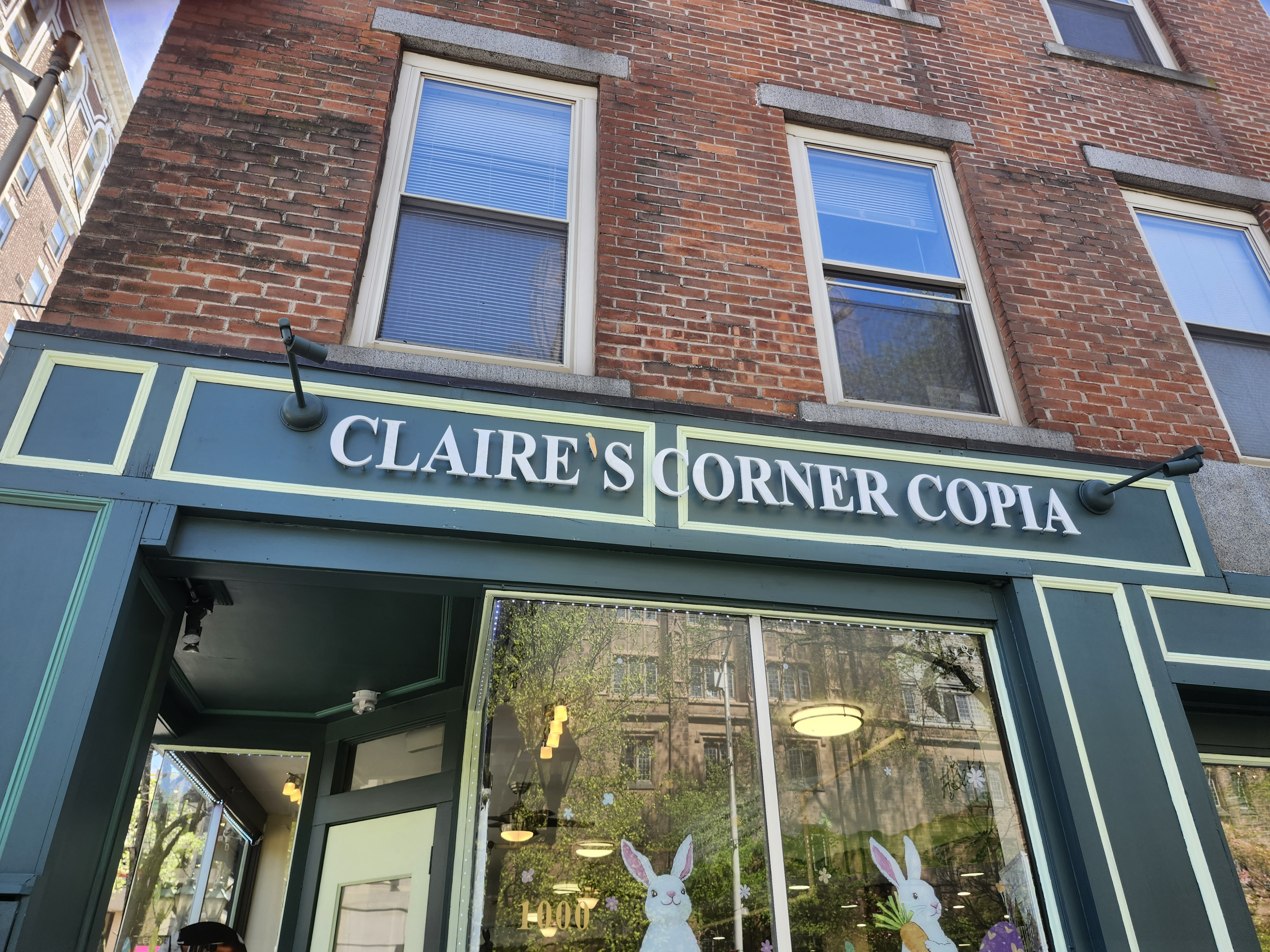
Claire's Corner Copia on April 30, 2025

When the restaurant was founded in 1975, it was not vegetarian. Chef Criscuolo told the Yale Daily News that she removed meat from the menu in a "radical move" that "forces people to eat more fruits and vegetables." A former nurse, Criscuolo prides herself on offering healthy food. The restaurant has an extensive vegan menu.

Lonely Planet calls Claire's "fresh, organic" food "the best" in town. Popular menu offerings include smoothies, fresh juices, and desserts that are vegan, gluten-free, or both. Claire's also has a dairy-kosher certification issued by both Rabbi David Avigdor and Rabbi Hyman from the Vaad Hakashrus of Fairfield County in Connecticut.

== See also ==
- List of vegetarian and vegan restaurants
