= Downtown New Haven =

Neighborhood in New Haven, Connecticut

- Neighborhood of New Haven
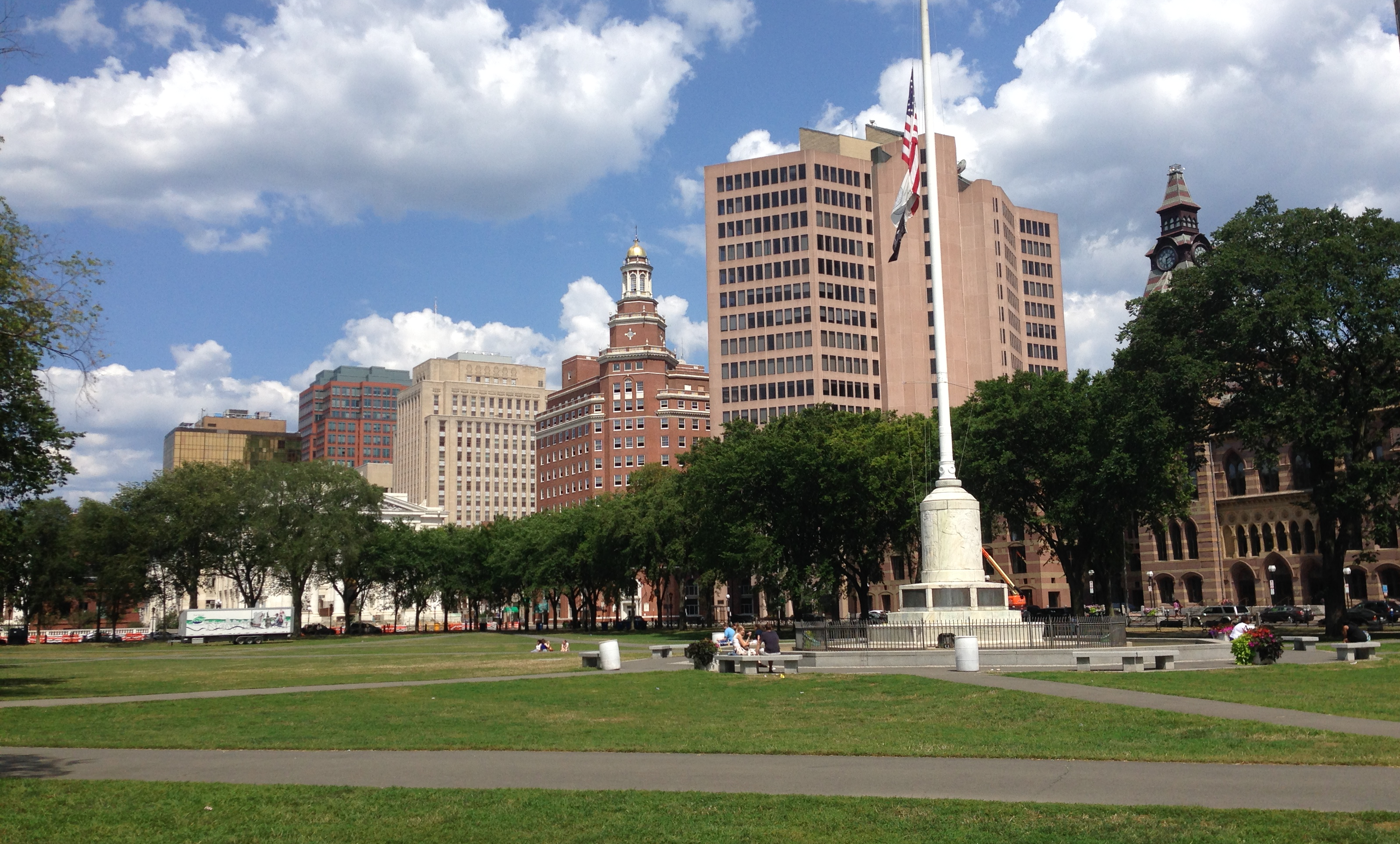
- Office buildings visible from the New Haven Green

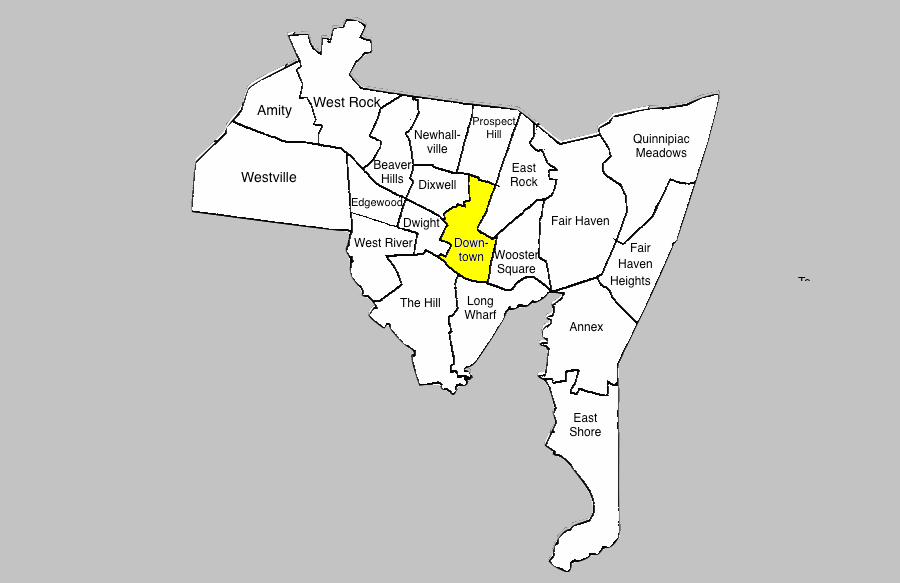
- Downtown within New Haven
- Coordinates: 41°18′25″N 72°55′37″W
- Country: United States
- State: Connecticut
- City: New Haven

Downtown New Haven is the neighborhood located in the heart of the city of New Haven, Connecticut. It is made up of the original nine squares laid out in 1638 to form New Haven, including the New Haven Green, and the immediate surrounding central business district, as well as a significant portion of the Yale University campus. The area includes many restaurants, cafes, theaters and stores. Downtown is bordered by Wooster Square to the east, Long Wharf to the southeast, the Hill neighborhood to the south, the Dwight neighborhood to the west, the Dixwell neighborhood to the northwest, the Prospect Hill area to the north, and East Rock to the northeast.

Downtown New Haven is one of the most residential downtown areas in the United States, with nearly 7,000 inhabitants. The expansion of housing options in recent years has helped support downtown businesses and has brought about a surge in economic activity. Secondary streets and areas at the periphery of the neighborhood that once contained vacant storefronts are now almost entirely leased to restaurants and retailers, and the office vacancy rate has dramatically fallen as well.

== Geography ==
Downtown New Haven is divided into several independent sections centered on the New Haven Green. This basic structure is a remnant of the 1638 New Haven Plan. The main campus of Yale University, which is located to the north and west of the Green, is sometimes considered distinct from but intermingled with Downtown.

=== Chapel Street ===
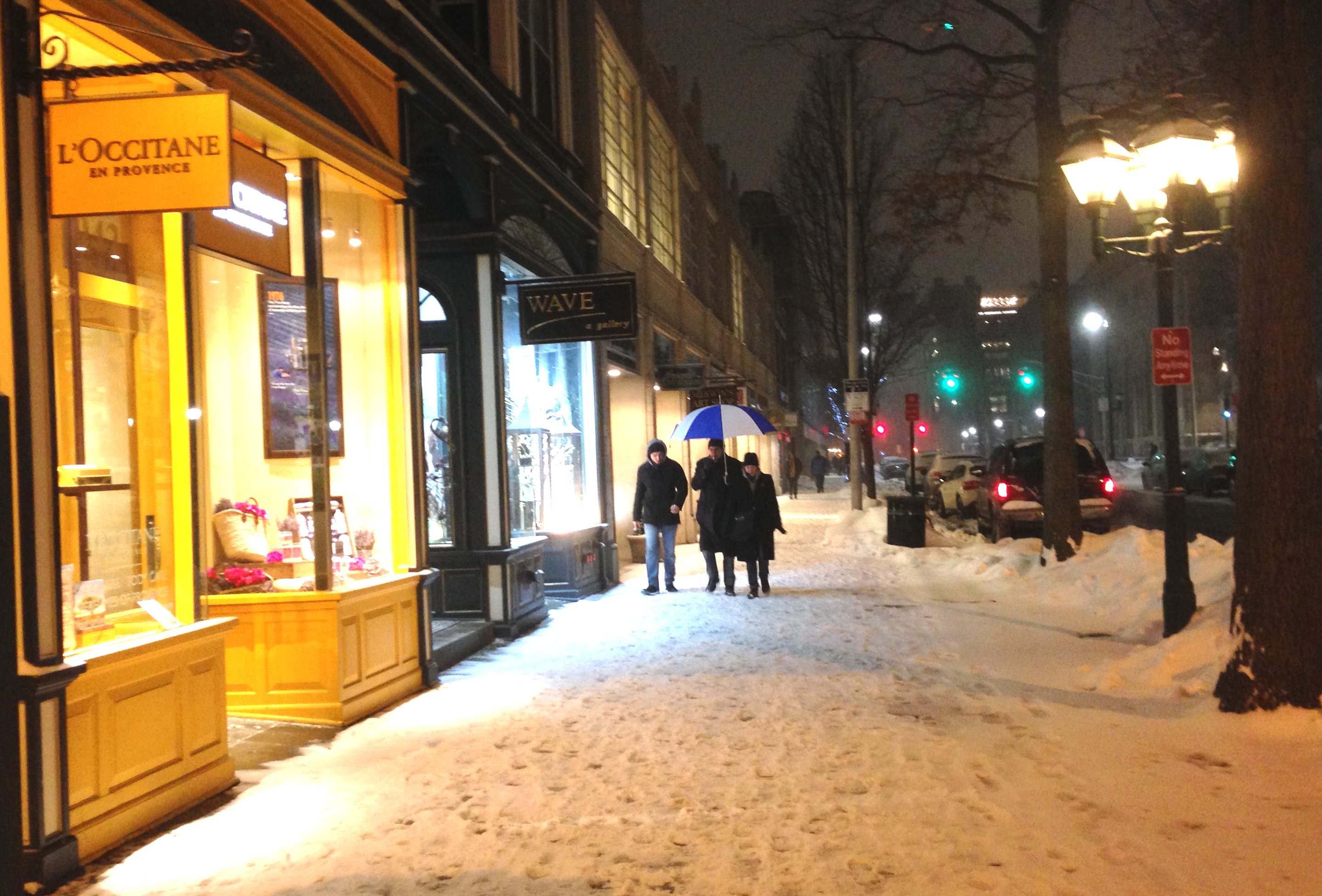
Shops along Chapel Street

The area bounded by Chapel and Crown Streets is a popular stretch of restaurants, boutiques and bars located across from the Old Campus of Yale University. Includes such historic establishments as Union League Cafe and the c. 1934 Owl Shop cigar lounge. The Anchor Bar, notable for its Art Moderne style and popularity with playwright Thornton Wilder, operated on College Street from the 1940s until 2015.

The area is largely coterminous with the Chapel Street Historic District. Notable buildings include the Hotel Taft and the Chapel Square Mall. The Yale University Art Gallery and Yale Center for British Art are also located here.

=== Broadway ===
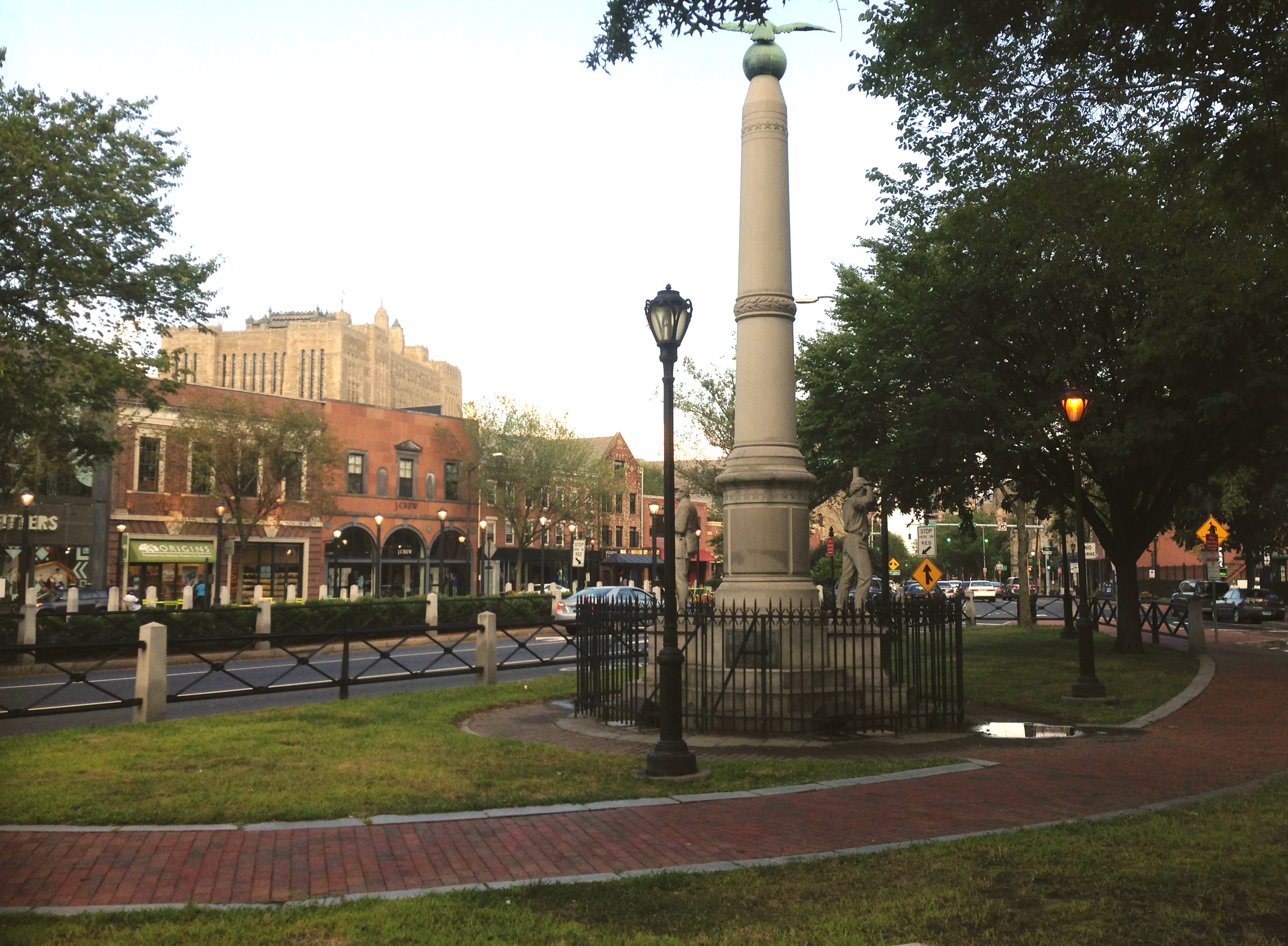
Broadway Triangle, at the center of the Broadway Area

The Broadway area is a commercial center that has since the 1990s been bought piece-by-piece by Yale University and redeveloped into The Shops at Yale shopping district. This section was previously notable as home of the Yankee Doodle Coffee Shop and Cutlers Records.

=== Ninth Square ===
The Ninth Square district, which contains the blocks southeast of the New Haven Green, has experienced a resurgence as a nightlife and arts district since the first decade of the 21st century.

The majority of buildings within these blocks are preserved as the Ninth Square Historic District.

=== Whitney Avenue ===
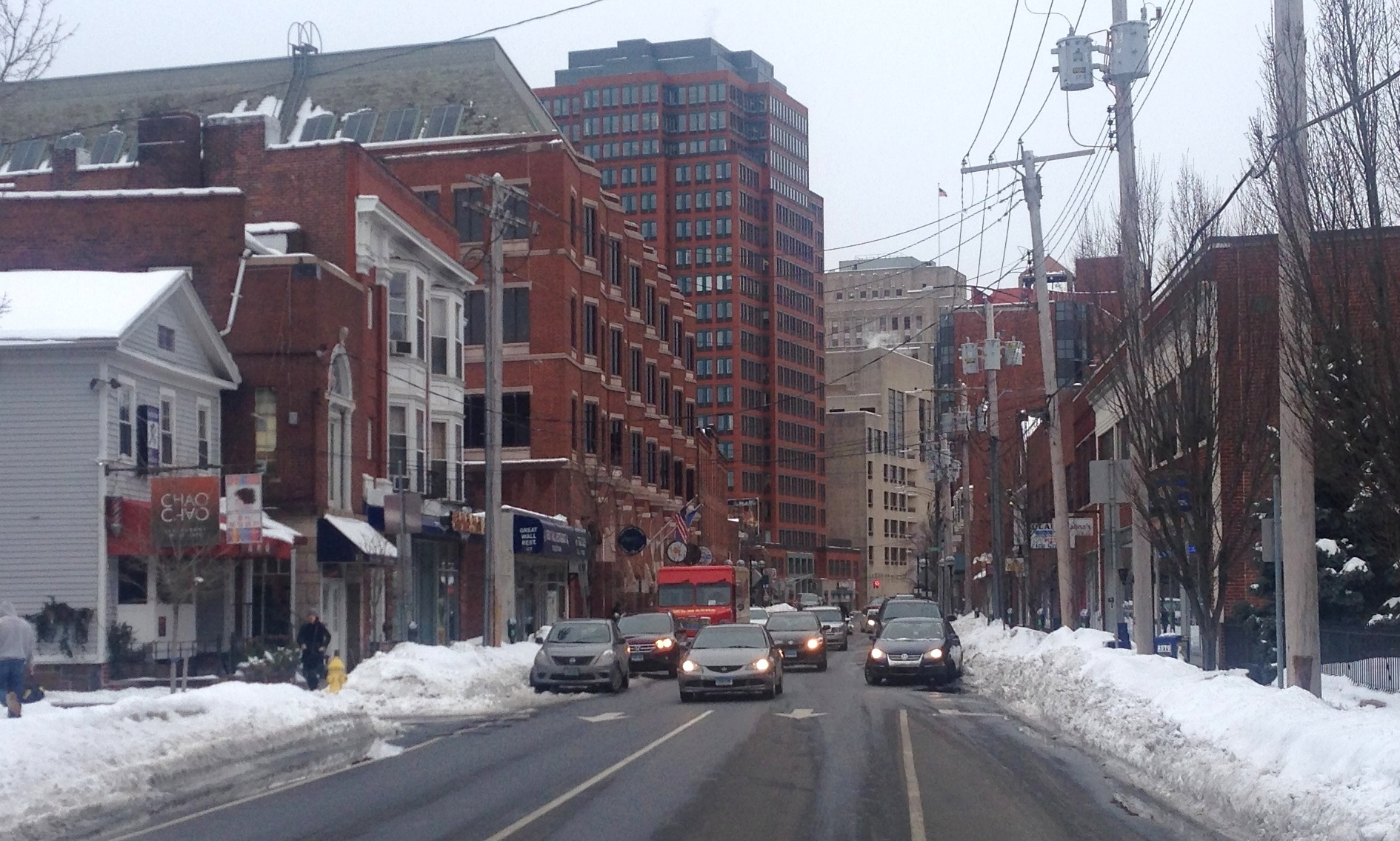
Whitney Avenue

The Whitney Avenue corridor, north of the New Haven Green, contains shops and eateries that are primarily owned by Yale University and cater to its student population. This area serves as a center for New Haven's East Asian community, with several restaurants and grocery stores catering to this population and an annual Chinese New Year festival parading up Whitney Avenue.

== Notable sites ==
- Center Church on the Green Crypt, the best-preserved burial ground in the country (because it lies underneath a church), with gravestones dating back to the mid-17th century that include numerous colonial luminaries.
- Chapel Street Historic District, an area southwest of the Green containing many shops, restaurants, night clubs, bars, art museums, theaters, and book stores. The district is listed on the National Register of Historic Places (NRHP) and includes areas along Crown Street.
- Criterion Cinemas, a seven-screen movie theater showing first-run and international films.
- Grove Street Cemetery
- Harkness Tower
- Knights of Columbus Building
- Louis' Lunch Oldest hamburger restaurant still operating in U.S.
- New Haven City Hall
- New Haven County Courthouse
- New Haven Free Public Library
- New Haven Green
- Ninth Square Historic District, an NRHP-listed area of historic 19th and early 20th century commercial buildings, directly southeast of the Green. The area is also a special taxing district.
- Omni Hotel, a four-star high-rise hotel.
- Shubert Theatre
- Toad's Place (officially within the Dixwell neighborhood)
- Yale Center for British Art
- Yale Repertory Theatre
- Yale University Art Gallery
- Yale University's Old Campus

== Notable sites of the past ==
- Chapel Square Mall (1967–2002). Now converted to luxury apartments; the first indoor shopping mall in the country to be converted as such.
- College Street Cinema
- College (Hyperion) Theater (1880–1998)
- The Edw. Malley Co. (1852–1982). Demolished in 1997 and replaced by Gateway Community College.
- Kresge's. Converted into a parking garage.
- Macy's. Demolished in 2007. Replaced by Gateway Community College.
- New Haven Arena (1914–1924, 1926-1972?)
- New Haven Coliseum (1972–2007). Razed and filled with a parking lot.
- Shartenberg's Department Store (1915–1962). Razed in 1964 as part of Mayor Richard C. Lee's redevelopment plans. For many years a parking lot, the site has been replaced by 360 State Street, a mixed-use development of high-rise condominiums, offices and apartments.
- York Square Cinema (1970–2005)

== See also ==
- Oak Street Connector
- Link to current Downtown New Haven framework plan for development and discussion
