= New Haven Free Public Library =

Coordinates: 41.3087°N 72.9257°W

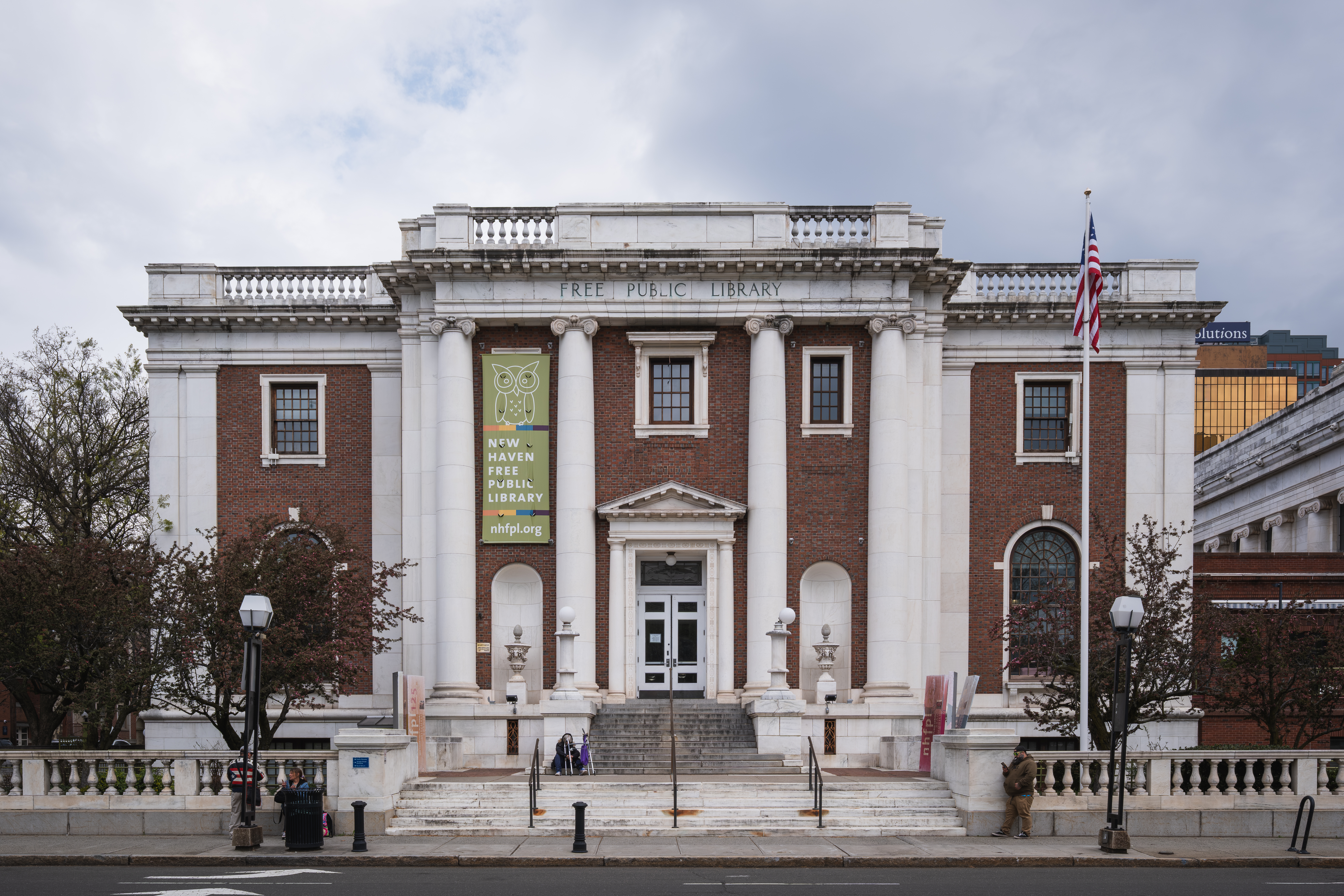
- Location: New Haven, Connecticut, United States
- Established: 1887
- Branches: 6 (including Bookmobile)

Collection
- Size: 485,823

Access and use
- Circulation: 314,686
- Population served: 129,779 (New Haven, 2010)
- Members: 42,838 (FY 2011-12)

Other information
- Budget: $3,617,074 (FY 2012-13)
- Director: Martha Brogan
- Employees: 38 FT (FY 2013-14)
- Website: NHFPL.org

The New Haven Free Public Library (also known as the NHFPL) is the public library system serving New Haven, Connecticut.

The system began in 1887 in a leased location but quickly outgrew its space. The Ives Memorial Library is the main branch of the system and is located on the New Haven Green. The neo-Georgian building was designed by Cass Gilbert and finished in 1911. This building was renovated and expanded in 1990.

Murals in the main library originated as Public Works Administration projects. Two lunettes in the main hall, designed by Bancel LaFarge of Mt. Carmel, Connecticut, depict scenes from New Haven's history. The Rip Van Winkle murals in the meeting room were painted in 1934 by a team of artists led by Salvatore DiNaio and Frank J. Rutkowski. There is also a set of stained glass windows in the Ives Library designed by David Wilson of South New Berlin, New York including circular and rectangular laylights as well as rectangular and half-round windows.

There are also neighborhood branches in Westville (Mitchell), Fair Haven, Dixwell (Stetson) and The Hill (Wilson). The Wilson branch features an art installation by Leila Daw depicting patterns of immigration.

In April 2012, the library underwent a significant rebranding effort in celebration of its 125th anniversary. In addition to updates in design and significant changes in borrowing policies, the library also adopted a retitled NHFPL125+ classification.
