= New Haven Green =

Park in New Haven, Connecticut

Coordinates: 41.308031°N 72.926980°W

- New Haven Green Historic District
- U.S. National Register of Historic Places
- U.S. National Historic Landmark District
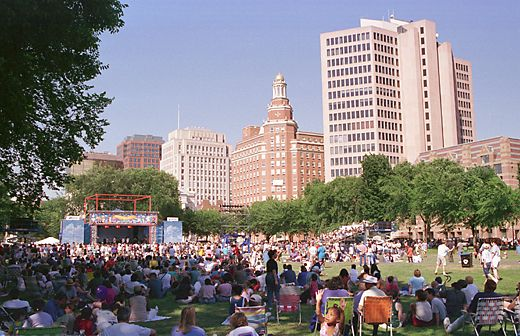
- The Green is a popular venue for festivals

- Location within Connecticut Location within the United States
- Location: New Haven, Connecticut
- Built: 1638
- Architect: Ithiel Town, David Hoadley
- Architectural style: Gothic, Federal
- Website: thenewhavengreen.org
- NRHP reference No.: 70000838

Significant dates
- Added to NRHP: December 30, 1970
- Designated NHLD: December 30, 1970

The New Haven Green is a 16-acre (65,000 m^{2}) privately owned park and recreation area located in the downtown district of the city of New Haven, Connecticut, United States. It comprises the central square of the nine-square settlement plan of the original Puritan colonists in New Haven, and was designed and surveyed by colonist John Brockett. Today the Green is bordered by the modern paved roads of College, Chapel, Church, and Elm streets. Temple Street bisects the Green into upper (northwest) and lower (southeast) halves.

The green is host to numerous public events, such as the International Festival of Arts and Ideas and New Haven Jazz Festival, summer jazz and classical music concerts that can draw hundreds of thousands of people, as well as typical daily park activities. The New Haven Green Historic District was designated a National Historic Landmark District for the architectural significance of the three 19th-century churches located there.

The New Haven Green is one of the oldest and most well-known town greens in the nation, dating back to at least 1638. As of July 2017, the City of New Haven offers free public WiFi on the Green.

== History ==
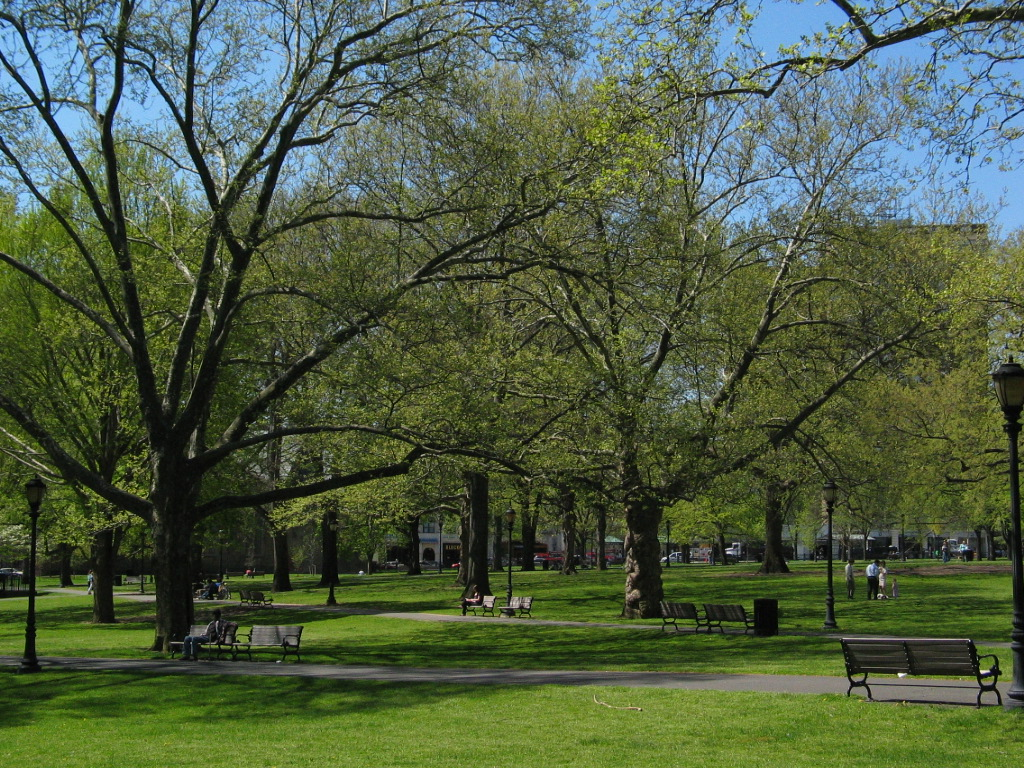
The upper Green in spring

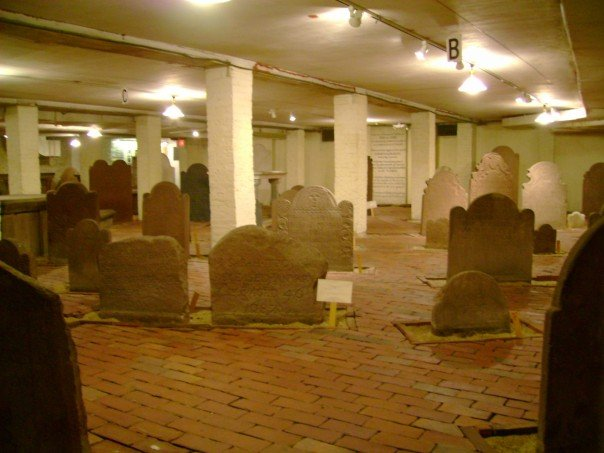
The crypt at Center Church-on-the-Green

The Green is a traditional town green (common) and was originally known as "the marketplace". It was completed in 1638. The Puritans were said to have designed the green large enough to hold the number of people who they believed would be spared in the Second Coming of Christ: 144,000.

In its early years, the Green held a watch house, a prison and a school. The upper Green also once held the First Methodist Church. The church was removed from the Green in 1848 with a new church built across Elm Street (designed by Henry Austin). The Green also held a succession of statehouses, dating from the time when New Haven was joint capital of Connecticut with Hartford. The first was built in 1719. As the colony grew, this was replaced by a second, brick colonial building, built in 1763. The most recent state house, on the northwest corner of the green, was erected in 1831, designed by Ithiel Town in a Greek Revival style in stone and marble. Ultimately, Hartford was declared the sole capital and this building was demolished (despite protests by preservationists) in 1889.

The Green served as the parade grounds for the New Haven militia, who, under the leadership of Benedict Arnold, rushed to Massachusetts after hearing of the Battle of Lexington and Concord and participated in the Battle of Bunker Hill in the American Revolution. This indirectly led to the burning of most of the city by the British when they landed in New Haven in 1779.

The Green was used as the main burial grounds for the residents of New Haven during its first 150 years, but by 1821 the practice was abolished and many of the headstones were moved to the Grove Street Cemetery. However, the remains of the dead were not moved, and thus still remain below the soil of the Green. It is conservatively estimated that between 4,000 and 5,000 people remain buried there, including Benedict Arnold's first wife, members of President Rutherford B. Hayes' family, Reverend James Pierpont (founder of Yale University), and Theophilus Eaton, one of the founders of New Haven and the church and governor of the New Haven Colony for 19 years.

On the evening of October 29, 2012, winds from Hurricane Sandy knocked over an oak tree on the Upper Green. Intertwined in the dirt and roots was a human skeleton. The police and medical examiner were called to the scene. The bones likely date back to colonial times, when the Green was used as a cemetery. The Grove Street cemetery that replaced it was chartered in 1797. A small portion of the burial ground is now preserved in The Center Church Crypt.

=== The Committee of the Proprietors of Common and Undivided Lands at New Haven ===
A self-electing group of private individuals, the Committee of the Proprietors of Common and Undivided Lands at New Haven, maintain ownership of the green. This five-member committee oversees the large, main portion of the green. The proprietors are drawn from the ranks of prominent city residents. Members are appointed for life, and when one dies the four remaining members convene to select a replacement.

== On the Green ==
Located on the upper Green are three historic early 19th century churches which reflect the city's theocratic roots. Two of the three churches are the work of the influential early-19th century architects Ithiel Town and Asher Benjamin, and one of them is the nation's first large-scale Gothic Revival structure. Because of this architectural legacy, the green was designated a National Historic Landmark District in 1970. The three churches are:

- United Church on the Green (United Church of Christ / Congregational), or North Church, was built in Federal style by David Hoadley in 1814.
- "Center Church on the Green", or The First Church of Christ (United Church of Christ / Congregational) was established in 1639. The current church, designed in Georgian style by architect Ithiel Town, was built in 1812. The Center Church Crypt contains the identified remains of about 137 people, and the likely remains of over 1,000 that are unidentified. Sarah Rutherford Trowbridge has the oldest dated stone (1687) in the Crypt.
- Trinity Church on the Green is an Episcopal congregation founded in 1752, and was also designed by Ithiel Town in 1813, and built between 1814 and 1815. It is the first Gothic Style church identified in the United States. It was consecrated in 1816.
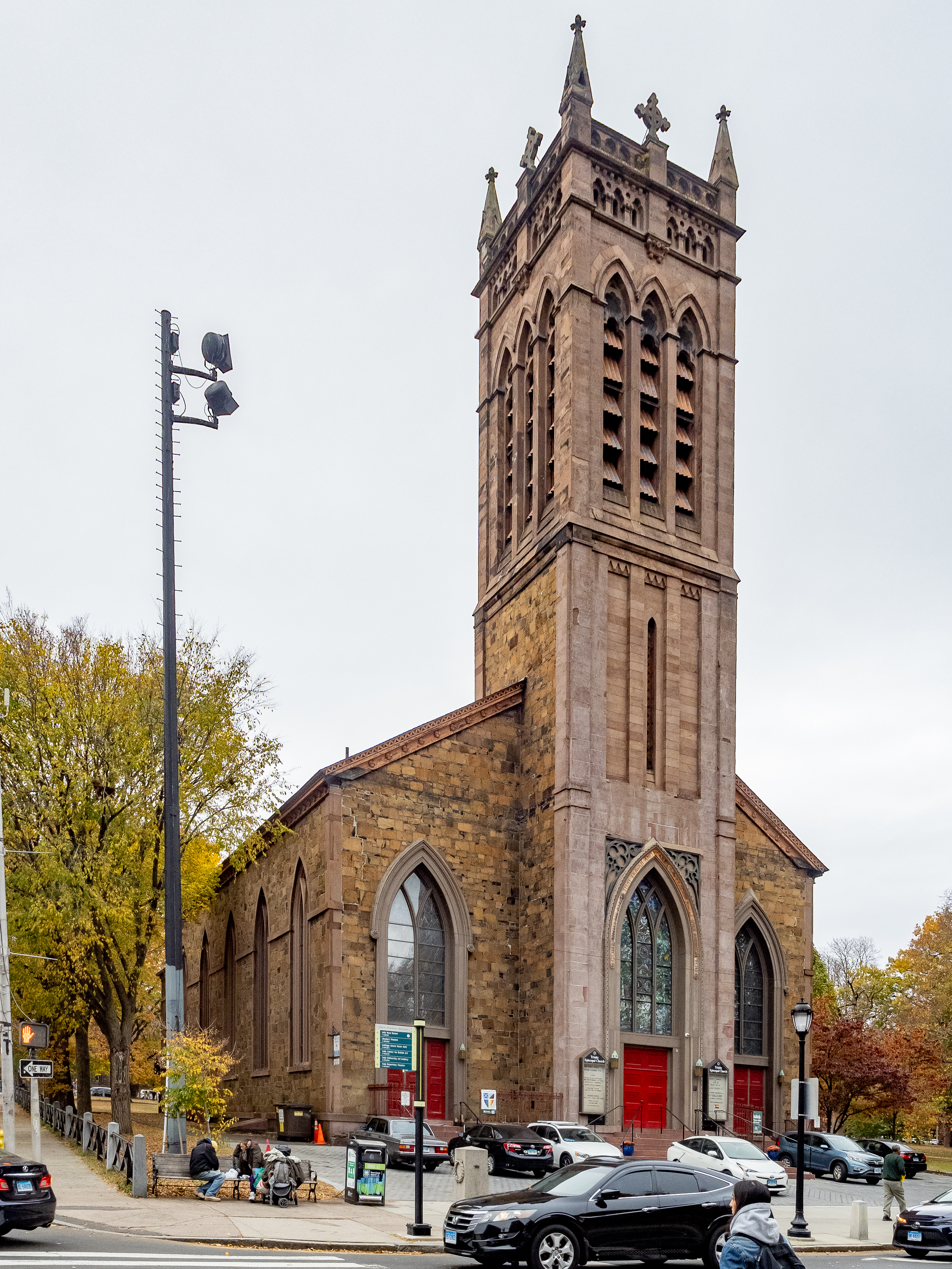
Trinity Church on the Green

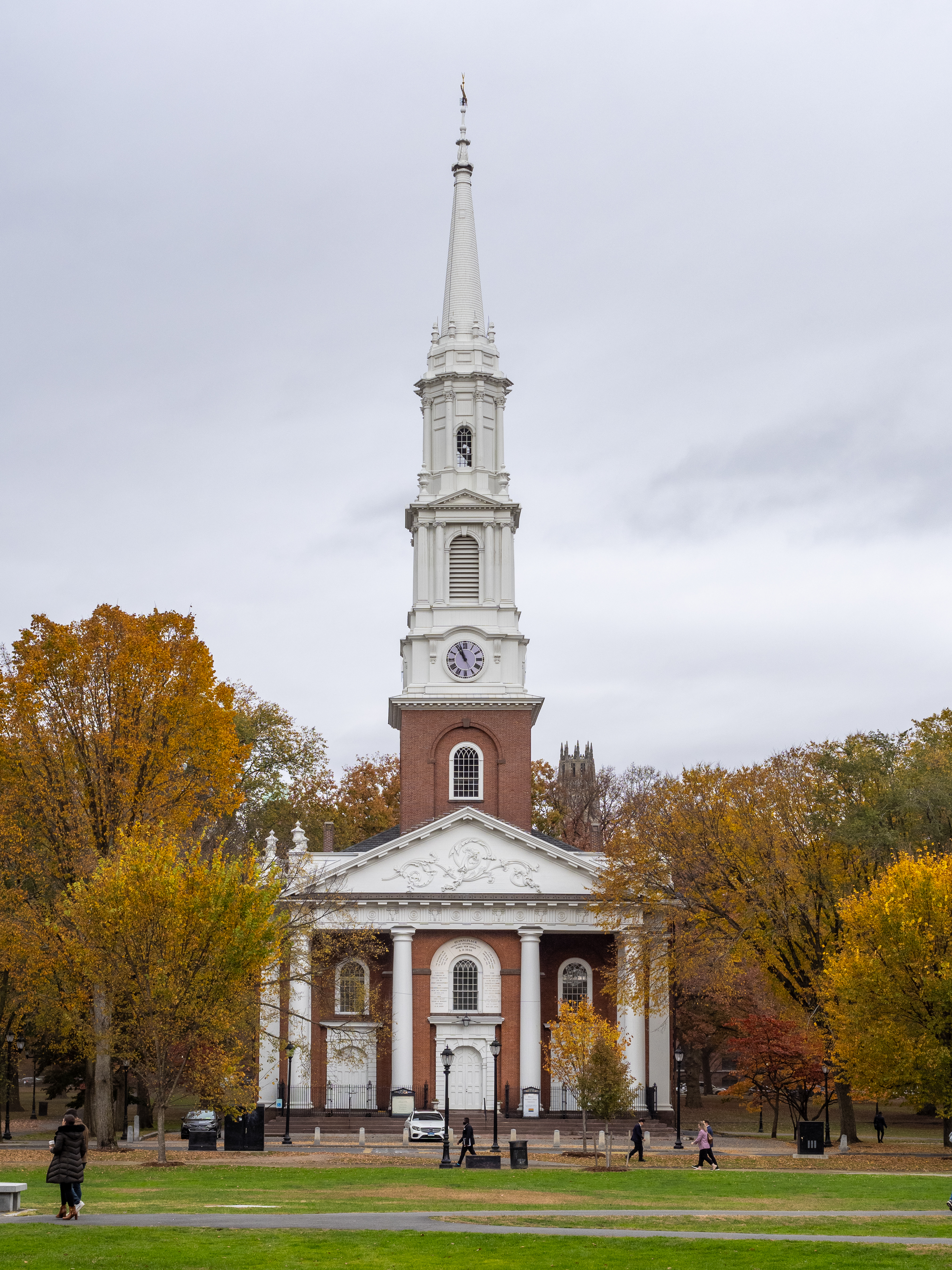
Center Church on the Green

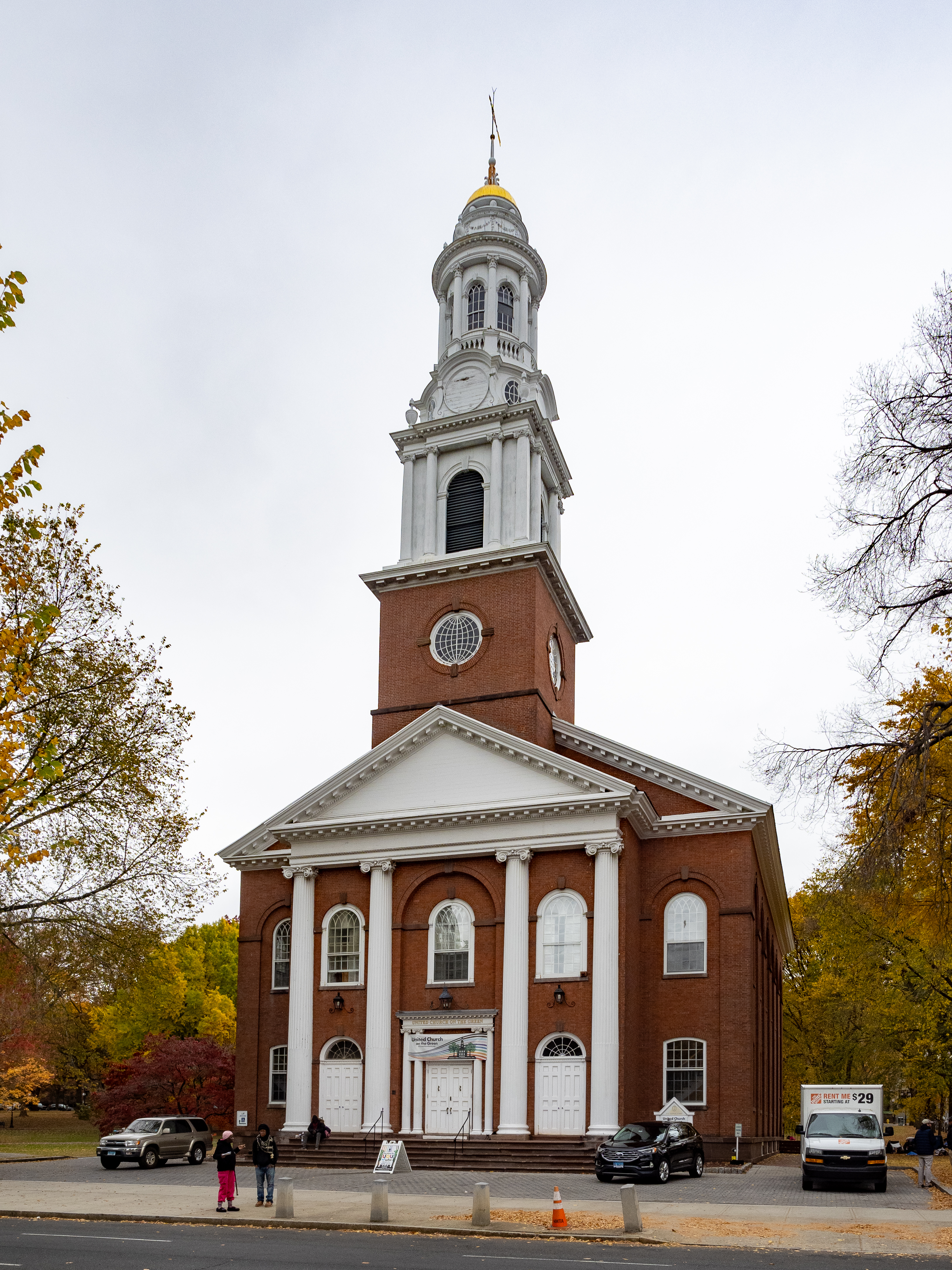
United Church on the Green

In the lower Green are the Bennett Fountain (built in 1907 and designed after the Choragic Monument of Lysicrates in Athens) and the flagpole with granite World War I memorial (designed by Douglas Orr in 1928) and fountain (added in 2003).

While once the edges of the Green were covered with a glorious canopy of elms, planted originally by James Hillhouse, most died of Dutch elm disease. In the 1980s, through the efforts of the Garden Club of New Haven, disease-resistant elms were planted in an attempt to memorialize the legacy of the trees that gave New Haven the nickname "Elm City".

== Around the Green ==
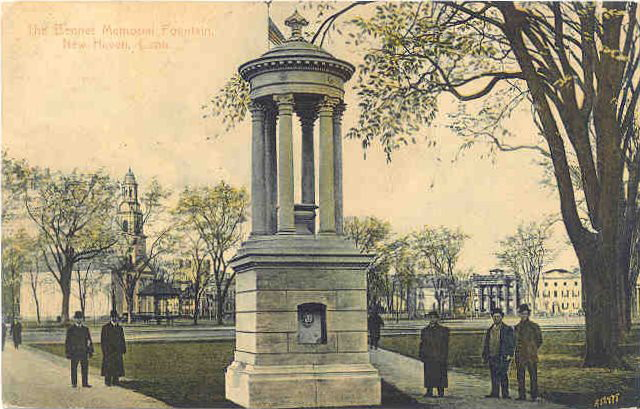
Bennett Memorial Fountain on the Green, a year old when this postcard was mailed in 1908

Bordering the Green are municipal, commercial and university structures. On the northwest side of the Green, across College Street, stand Phelps Gate and the Yale University buildings bordering Old Campus. Before the Old Campus was built, the buildings of Yale's Old Brick Row bordered the Green here. On the southwest side along Chapel Street are stores, bars, and such popular restaurants as Claire's Corner Copia. On the southeast side of the green, across Church Street is The Exchange Building (1832, restored in 1990) and the Richard C. Lee United States Courthouse (James Gamble Rogers, 1913). This was once the site of the Tontine Hotel, built by David Hoadley. New Haven's Victorian City Hall (by Henry Austin in 1861; restored and added to by Herbert S. Newman and Partners) and the Amistad Memorial are also at this end of the Green. The memorial stands on the site of the jail that held the Amistad captives during their time in New Haven. Spectators came to see them when they were brought out to exercise on the Green and paid 12 and a half cents to view them in the jail.

Opposite the eastern corner of the lower green is the Union and New Haven Trust Building (now Wells Fargo and The Union apartments) designed by Cross and Cross in Colonial Revival style in 1927. The design is a tribute to the federal churches on the green and even borrows the cupola from the United Church. On the northeast side along Elm Street by the lower Green is the New Haven Free Public Library (Cass Gilbert, 1908). The library was once the site of the Bristol House, also designed by David Hoadley, whose doorway is now at the Metropolitan Museum of Art.

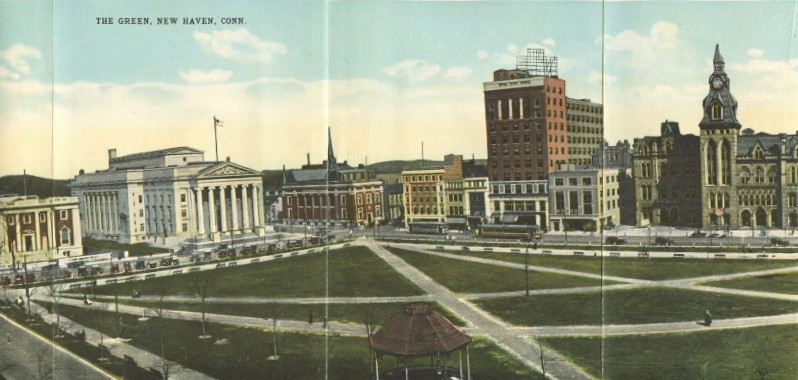
Part of a panoramic view of The Green in a "Souvenir Folder" sold and mailed in 1919. The New Haven County Courthouse is the building with six pillars left of center, and City Hall is to the right.

Next to the library is the Beaux-Arts, neoclassical New Haven County Courthouse. The courthouse was designed by New Haven architects William Allen and Richard Williams, modeled after St. George's Hall in Liverpool, England. The statuary in front of the courthouse is by the sculptor J. Massey Rhind and murals and lunettes inside the courthouse are by the painter T. Thomas Gilbert.

The upper Green on Elm is bordered by "Quality Row", containing some of the oldest structures in New Haven: the federal style white clapboard Nicholas Callahan house, once a tavern (now the Yale Elihu Senior Society), the federal Eli W. Blake House (now the Graduate Club), the federal John Pierpont house (now the Yale University Koerner Center) built in 1767 and the brick Greek Revival Governor Ralph Isaacs Ingersoll House, designed in 1829 by Town and Davis.

== See also ==
- List of National Historic Landmarks in Connecticut
- National Register of Historic Places listings in New Haven, Connecticut
