= American almanacs =

A tradition of almanacs published for North America began in New England in the 17th century. A New World's dwelling would seldom be found without the latest print of North American almanac and The Pilgrim's Progress.

The earliest almanac published for New England appeared in Cambridge, Massachusetts as early as 1639, by William Pierce. It was the second work printed in the English colonies of America altogether (the first being The Oath of a Free-man, printed earlier in the same year). The earliest New England almanac of which an extant copy survives in the Library of Congress was published by Zechariah Brigden in Cambridge in 1659. Harvard College became the first center for the annual publication of almanacs with various editors including Samuel Danforth, Oakes, Cheever, Chauncey, Dudley, Foster, et alia. An almanac maker going under the pseudonym of Poor Richard, Knight of the Burnt Island began to publish Poor Robin's Almanack, one of the first comic almanacs that parodied these horoscopes in its 1664 issue, saying, "This month we may expect to hear of the Death of some Man, Woman, or Child, either in Kent or Christendom." Other noteworthy comic almanacs include those published from 1687 to 1702 by John Tully of Saybrook, Connecticut. The Boston ephemeris was an early almanac published in Boston during the 1680s.

The most important early American almanacs were made from 1726 to 1775 by Nathaniel Ames of Dedham, Massachusetts. Many colonists sewed blank pages into their almanacs to keep a daily journal. Daily journal entries consisted of buildings being built, debt and spending, the death of neighbors, personal diaries, earthquakes, and weather. A few years later James Franklin began publishing the Rhode-Island Almanack in 1728. Five years later his brother Benjamin Franklin began publishing Poor Richard's Almanack from 1733 to 1758. Benjamin Banneker improved on the Almanac from 1792 to 1797.

== Almanacs published in the United States ==
From the late 18th to the early 19th century, there began a fashion of Farmers' Almanacs published regionally in the newly independent United States.

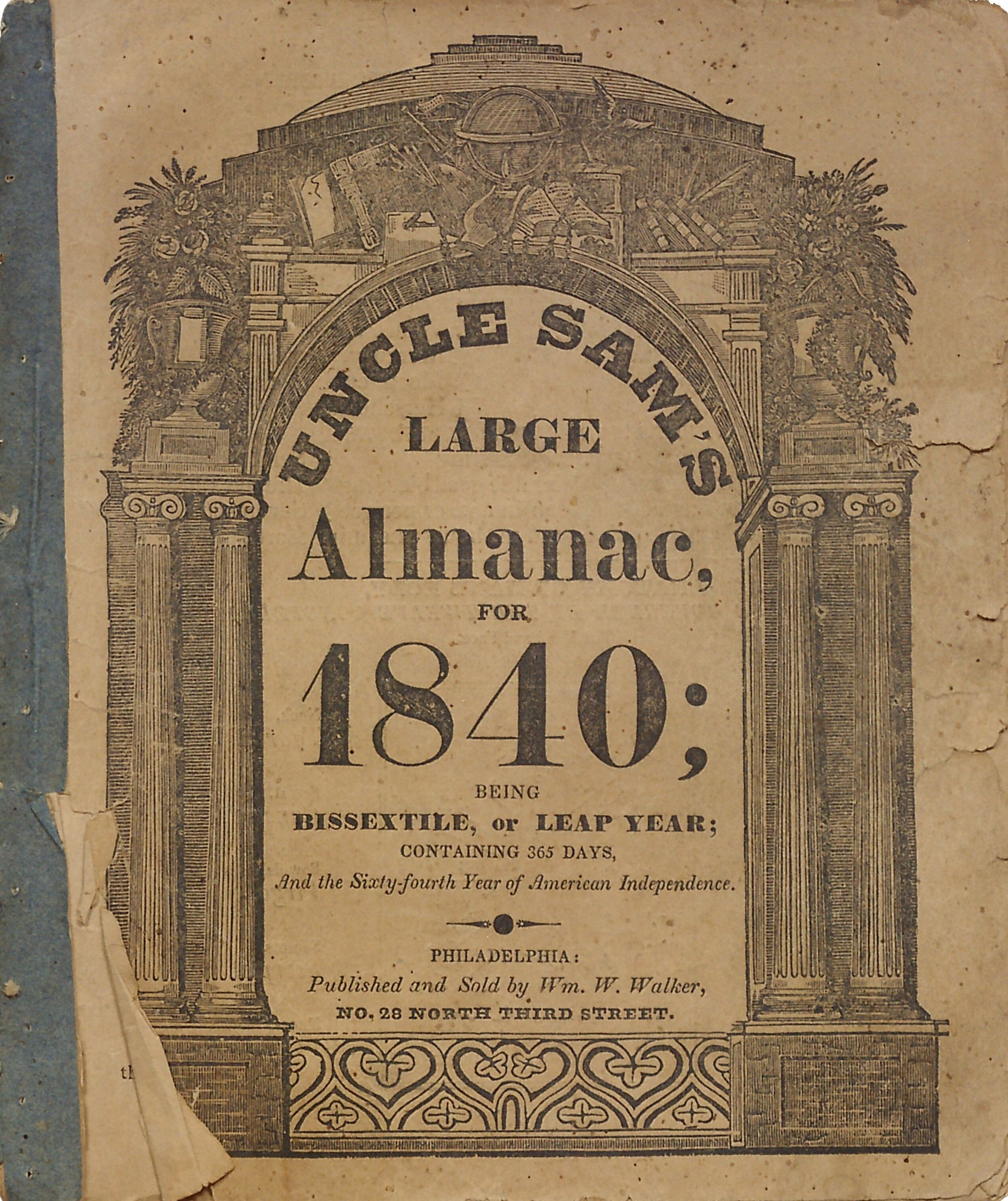
Uncle Sam's large almanac for 1840

- The Boston Ephemeris an Almanack, published 1685–1686 in Cambridge, Massachusetts by Samuel Green. Nathaniel Mather contributed the meridian calculation for Boston located in New England.
- "The United States almanac" 1776–
- The Farmer's Almanac, published from 1792, since 1836 known as The Old Farmer's Almanac
- Longworth's American Almanack, published 1797–1842 in New York City, New York by David Longworth and Thomas Longworth.
- Georgia and South-Carolina Almanack was published in Augusta, Georgia from 1807 to 1848 by Hartford, Connecticut native William Joseph Bunce from Richmond County, Georgia. The lunar phase and solar cycle calculations were contributed by Robert Grier from Wilkes County, Georgia. The Southern planter's ephemeris is recognized as the longest spanning almanac in the United States providing agriculturist and rural economist an annual probability for the Antebellum South. After the death of Robert Grier in 1848, the almanac became known as the Grier's Almanac.
- Washington's citizen and farmer's almanack, for the year 1810 .. containing, besides the astronomical calculations by Joshua Sharp, a variety of pieces in prose and verse
- "The Annual Visiter and Citizen and Farmer's Almanac" 1812–1818?
- The Citizen and farmer's almanac 1814–?
- The Farmers' Almanac, published since 1818 in Morristown, New Jersey, later in Newark, New Jersey, since 1955 by the Almanac Publishing Company in Lewiston, Maine.
- The Farmer's almanac, for the year of our Lord 1819 ... calculated for the meridian of Philadelphia by Andrew Beers (1749–1824), published by S. Potter & Co.
- The New England Farmer's Almanac (1820s-1830s?)
- The Maine Farmers' Almanac, printed from 1819 in Hallowell, Maine and later in Augusta, Maine, printed by Goodale, Glazier & Co. and edited by Daniel Robinson and Abel Bowen. Appeared until 1968.
- The New England Anti-Masonic Almanac, published 1829–1833 in Boston, Massachusetts by John Marsh
- The American Almanac and Repository of Useful Knowledge was published 1830–1861 by Gray and Bowen in Boston, Massachusetts. The annual was founded by Jared Sparks in 1830.
- The American Anti-Slavery Almanac, published 1836–1844 in Boston, Massachusetts by Nathaniel Southard.
- Ayer's American Almanac: For the Use of Farmers, Planters, Mechanics, and All Families was published in Lowell, Massachusetts from 1854 to 1911.
- Annual Register of Rural Affairs and Cultivator Almanac, published from 1855 to 1881 in Albany, New York by Luther Tucker also known for The Country Gentleman (1831) and The Genesee Farmer (1831).
- The Confederate States Almanac, and Repository of Useful Knowledge was published 1862–1865 by H.C. Clarke in Vicksburg, Mississippi and Mobile, Alabama. The Diary of the War for Separation was published as a continuum to the Confederate States Almanac presenting a chronicle narrative of the significant events and history of the present day civil revolution.
- Confederate States Almanac for the Year of Our Lord was published 1862–1865 by Southern Methodist Publishing House in Nashville, Tennessee and Burke, Boykin & Company in Macon, Georgia. The University of Alabama contributed the astronomical chronology for the annual almanacs.
- Hostetter's United States Almanac, for Merchants, Mechanics, Farmers, Planters, and General Family Use was published 1863–1909 in Pittsburgh, Pennsylvania by Hostetter & Smith. The publication advertises Hostetter's Stomach Bitters with branding of Saint George and the Dragon.
- American Almanac and Treasury of Facts published from 1878 to 1889 by The American News Company
