= John Pitkin Norton =

American biochemist (1822–1852)

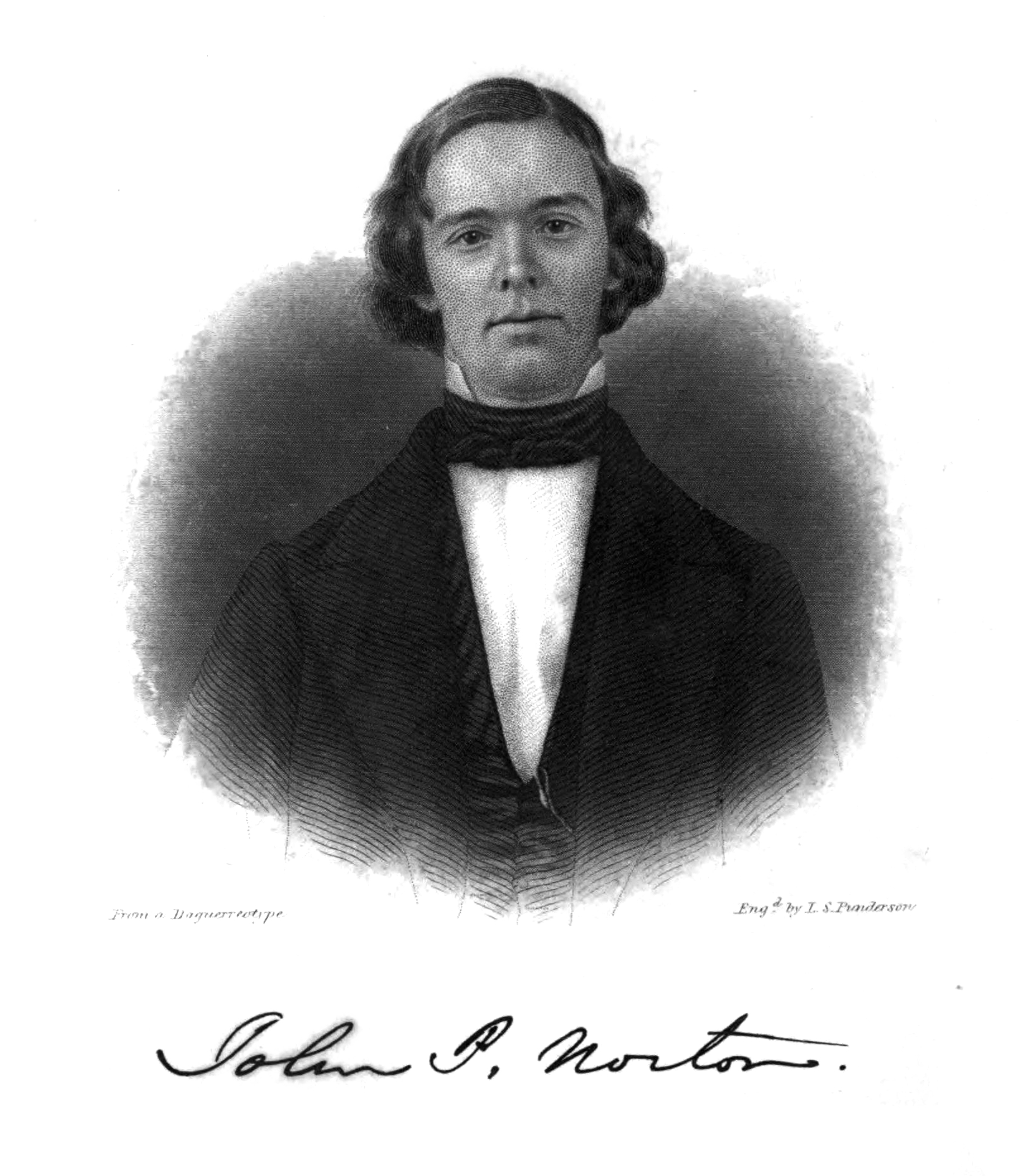
John Pitkin Norton

John Pitkin Norton (July 19, 1822 – September 5, 1852) was an educator, agricultural chemist, and author.

== Biography ==
Norton was born in Albany, New York, in 1822, where his father John Treadwell Norton, a successful farmer and engineer, owned a hardware store. His mother, Mary Hubbard Pitkin, married his father in 1821 and died in 1829. He and his father returned to Farmington, Connecticut, to live on land his father inherited from his grandfather John Treadwell, former governor of Connecticut.

Norton went to Edinburgh in 1844 to study agricultural chemistry with James F. W. Johnston. There he made a study of the oat which was read at the British Association in June, 1945. He then toured continental laboratories, including a visit with countryman Eben Horsford who was in Giessen studying with Liebig. To gain greater orientation to organic chemistry he went to Gerardus Mulder in Utrecht. Norton acted as a foreign correspondent for The Cultivator and American Agriculturalist as he submitted monthly letters describing his observations.

Norton studied chemistry under Benjamin Silliman at Yale College, and was eventually appointed professor of agricultural chemistry at Yale in 1846. He helped to found the department of philosophy and the arts at Yale with Silliman's son, Benjamin Silliman, Jr., which would later become the Sheffield Scientific School and the Graduate School of Arts and Sciences. He was the author of Elements of Scientific Agriculture (1850), and many scientific papers, dealing with the chemistry of crops. During his short teaching career at Yale (1846–52), he took Samuel William Johnson as a pupil, who would later become one of the country's foremost educators in scientific agriculture.

Norton succumbed to tuberculosis at the age of 30, and died in Farmington, Connecticut, in 1852. He is buried in Grove Street Cemetery in New Haven, Connecticut.

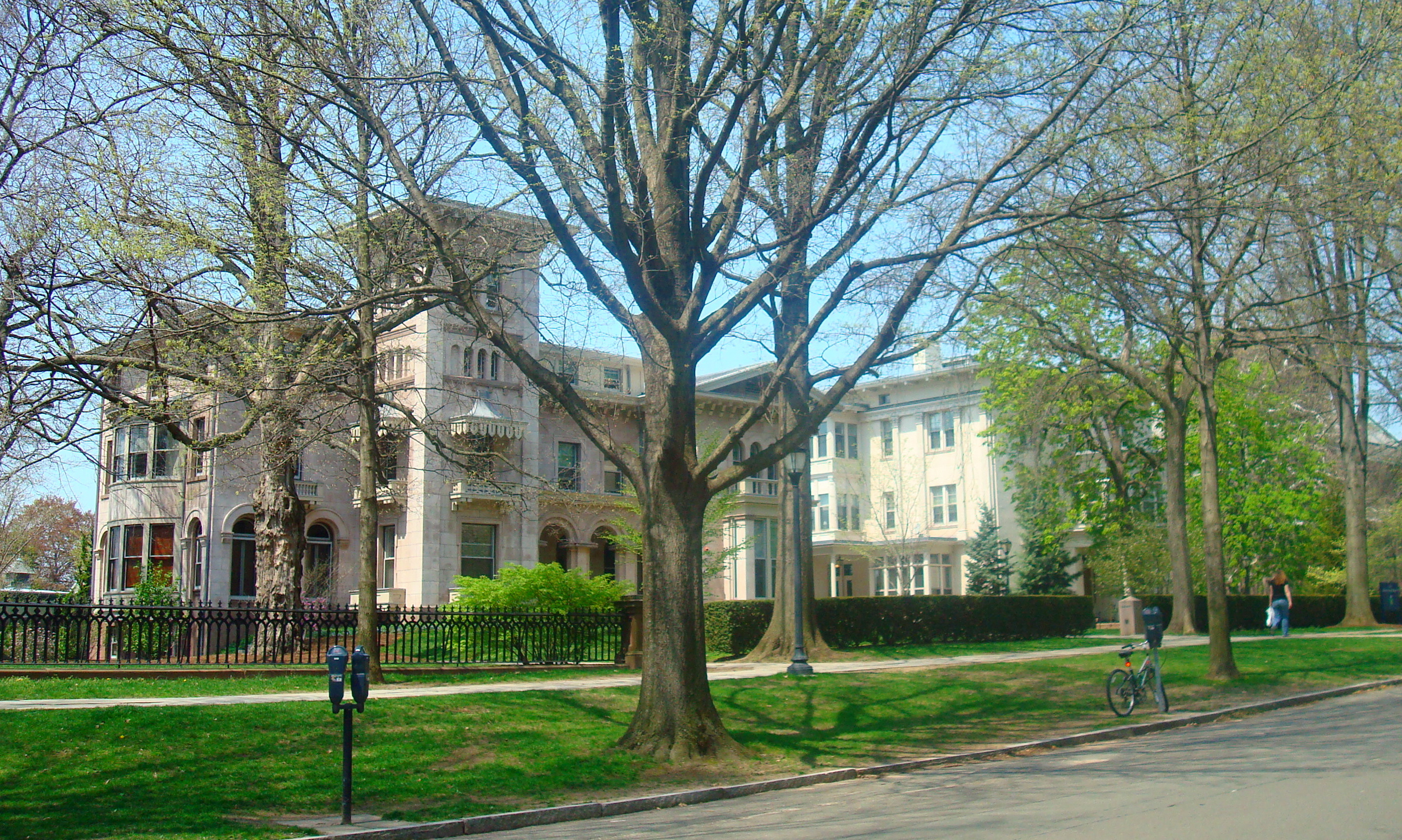
Norton's house on New Haven's Hillhouse Avenue was designed by Henry Austin, 1849

== Works ==
- Correspondence to The Cultivator August 22, 1844, p. 334, at Google Books
- Correspondence to The Cultivator September 24, 1844, p. 364, at Google Books
- Norton, John Pitkin (1860). Elements of Scientific Agriculture: Or The Connection Between Science and Art of Practical Farming. New York: C. M. Saxton, Barker & Company.- Originally published in 1850

== Legacy ==
Norton is one of the few scientists recognized in the United States Capitol in Washington DC. A small statue of him is on the Edmond Amateis bronze doors. (See pp. 350 – 351 of Art in the United States Capitol, 1978, US Government Printing Office.)

Norton's house, completed in 1849 and designed by Henry Austin to resemble an Italian villa, was included in the federal government's Historic American Buildings Survey as the John Pitkin Norton House. It was purchased by Yale in 1923 and is now known as Steinbach Hall. Norton's great-granddaughter, Mary DeWitt Pettit, donated his papers to Yale in 1969.
