= Samuel William Johnson (chemist) =

American agricultural chemist (1830–1909)

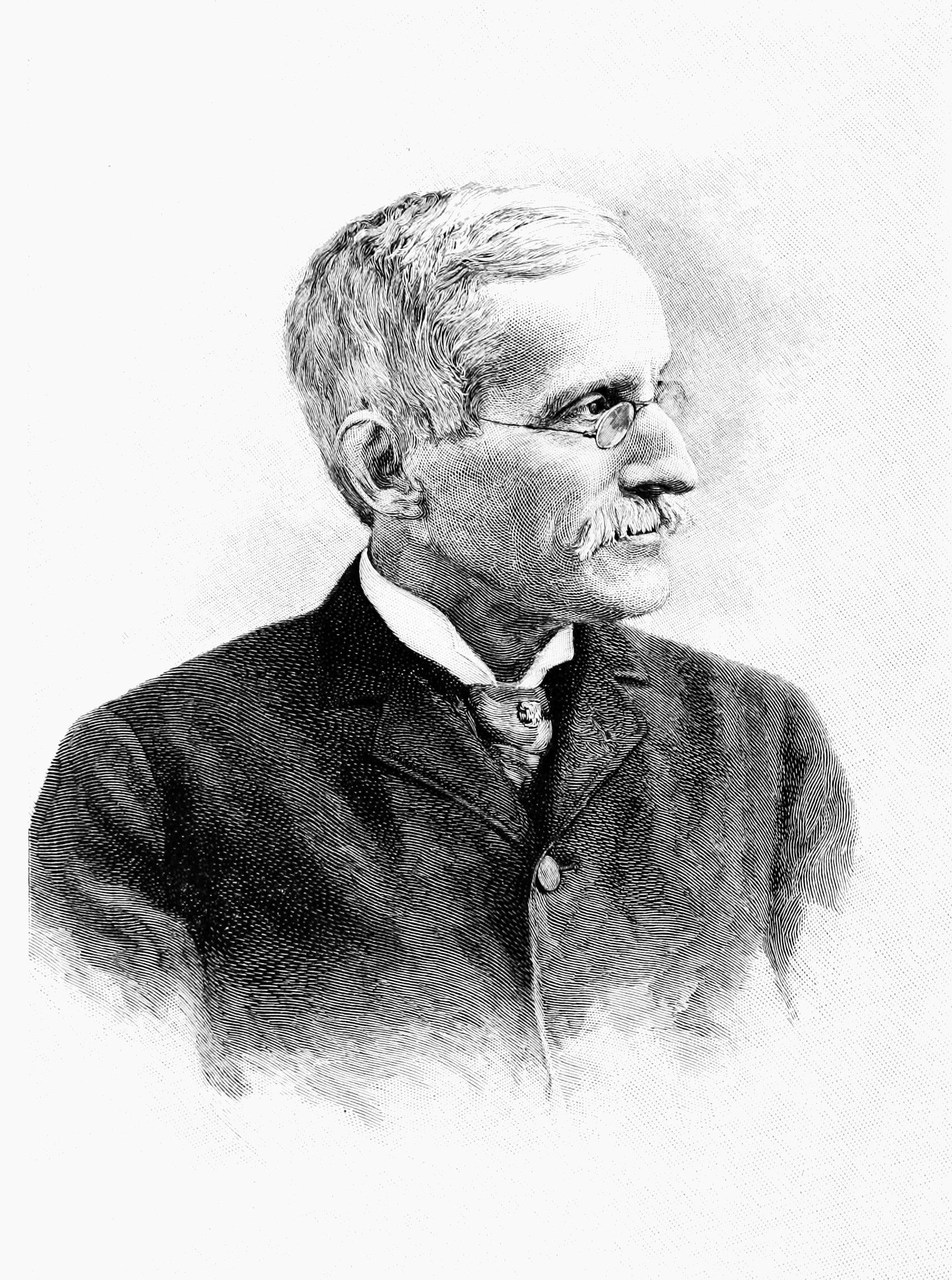

Samuel William Johnson (July 3, 1830 – July 21, 1909) was an American agricultural chemist. He promoted the movement to bring the sciences to the aid of American farmers through agricultural experiment stations and education in agricultural science.

Johnson, working in the 19th century, covered various aspects of farming that today would be called both organic and nonorganic. His work included exposing frauds in artificial manures (some of which would today be called chemical fertilizers).

== Biography ==
Johnson was born in Kingsboro, New York, the son of Abner Adolphus Johnson and Annah Wells Gilbert. Johnson's first teacher was his father; later he studied with David Mayhew in a school at Lowville, New York. Early on he obtained a textbook on chemistry by Fresenius, in which he learned methods of analytical chemistry.

Gaining admission to Yale University, Johnson took lessons from John Pitkin Norton, Benjamin Silliman, Benjamin Silliman, Jr. and James Dwight Dana among others. Upon graduation he went to Leipzig, studying with Otto Linne Erdmann. The next year he went to Munich and Liebig's lab. He studied physiological chemistry with Max Joseph von Pettenkofer and Wolfgang Franz von Kobell. Returning through England, he visited the lab of Edward Frankland and the experimental farms of John Bennet Lawes and Joseph Henry Gilbert.

In 1855 Johnson had his translation of Liebig's The Relations of Chemistry to Agriculture and the Experiments of Mr. J. B. Laws published by Luther Tucker, editor of The Country Gentleman.

In 1858, he became a chemist for the Connecticut Agricultural Society, in which capacity he issued an important series of papers on commercial fertilizers and allied subjects. In 1866, he became a member of the Connecticut State Board of Agriculture. Also in 1866, he was elected to the National Academy of Sciences.

Johnson’s skill with analytical chemistry brought him the position of First Assistant at the Yale Analytical Lab in 1874. A year later he was made professor of analytical chemistry. The following year he was also named professor of Agricultural Chemistry. He regularly attended meetings of agricultural societies and farmers' clubs.

He was director of the Connecticut Agricultural Experiment Station from 1877 to 1899. In 1878 Johnson was president of the American Chemical Society.

Johnson retired in 1896.
