= Mary DeWitt Pettit =

American physician (1908–1996)

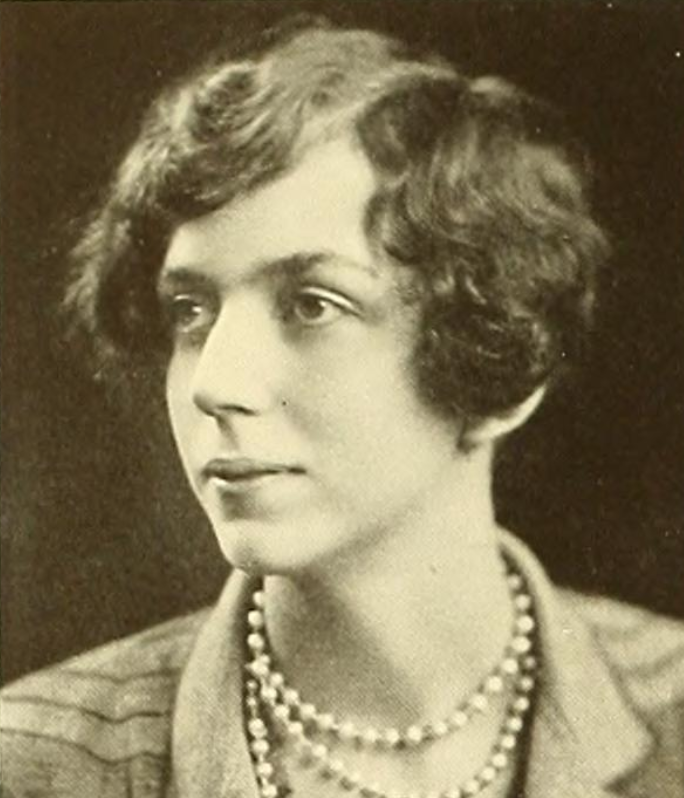
- Mary DeWitt Pettit, from the 1928 yearbook of Bryn Mawr College
- Born: January 1, 1908; Philadelphia, Pennsylvania, U.S.
- Died: May 5, 1996 (aged 88); Albuquerque, New Mexico, U.S.
- Occupations: Physician, medical researcher, medical school professor
- Relatives: John Pitkin Norton (great-grandfather)

Mary DeWitt Pettit (January 1, 1908 – May 5, 1996) was an American physician, medical school professor, and medical researcher. She served as a physician in the United States Navy during World War II. She was a obstetrician and gynecologist on the faculty of the Woman's Medical College of Pennsylvania.

== Early life and education ==
Pettit was born in Philadelphia, the daughter of John Reed Pettit and Elsie Norton Pettit. She was descended from Connecticut governor John Treadwell, and abolitionist John Treadwell Norton. Her great-grandfather, John Pitkin Norton, was a chemistry professor at Yale University. She graduated from Bryn Mawr College in 1928. She earned her medical degree from the University of Pennsylvania in 1932.

== Career ==
Pettit was an obstetrician and gynecologist on the faculty of Albany Medical College from 1938 to 1946, and at the Woman's Medical College of Pennsylvania from 1946. She served as a physician in the United States Navy during World War II, in charge of the women's branch of the hospital at the Marine depot at Parris Island. From 1961 to 1962, she was president of the Obstetrical Society of Philadelphia.

== Publications ==
Pettit's research was published in academic journals, including American Journal of Obstetrics and Gynecology, Obstetrical & Gynecological Survey, and Endocrinology.

- "A clinical study of acid alurate as a rectal analgesic during labor" (1938, with William A. Graham)
- "Hydatidiform mole following tubal pregnancy" (1941)
- "A review of ovarian pathology in 336 laparotomies" (1948)
- "Obstetrical Conditions Found in Older Women" (1949)
- "Placenta accreta complicated by hemoperitoneum" (1949, with Nathan Mitchell)
- "Pelvic Infection: Present Status of Treatment" (1950)
- "Geriatric Gynecology" (1954, with Catherine B. Hess and Jane Marshall Leibfried)
- "Management of the Menopause" (1955)
- "The Influence of Ovarian Hormones on Goitrogenesis" (1961, with Bernard A. Eskin and Mary B. Dratman)
- "Hemolytic disease of the newborn due to the Good factor" (1961, with Bernard A. Eskin and Elizabeth U. Laufer)
- Gynaecologic Diagnosis and Treatment (1962)
- "Environment in Relation to Gynecologic Disease" (1965)

== Personal life and legacy ==
Pettit died in Albuquerque, New Mexico in 1996, at the age of 88. Pettit donated the Markoe Family Papers to the Historical Society of Pennsylvania in 1966, and her great-grandfather's papers to Yale University in 1969. Drexel University awards an annual Mary Dewitt Pettit Fellowship, to support the research or special projects of junior faculty members in the College of Medicine.
