= Luther Tucker (publisher) =

American publisher (1802–1873)

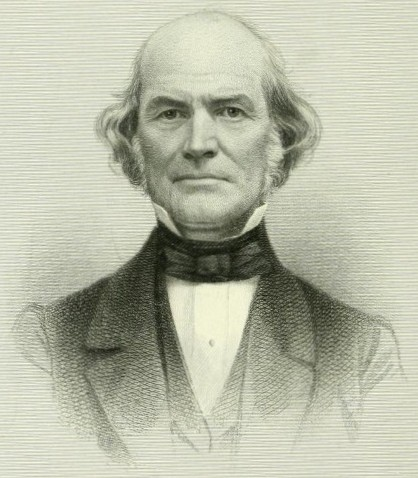
Luther Tucker

Luther Tucker (May 7, 1802 in Brandon, Vermont – January 26, 1873 in Albany, New York) was a publisher of farm journals in Rochester and Albany, New York.

Tucker started Genesee Farmer (January 1, 1831), acquired The Cultivator (January 1840), and later started Country Gentleman (November 4, 1852). He also started Rochester Advertiser (October 27, 1826), later acquired by Rochester Union, and finally merged into Rochester Times-Union.

The agricultural journals were quite popular before the U.S. Civil War, circulation then fell dramatically, rebuilding from lower numbers.

== Biography ==
At age 16, Luther Tucker was apprenticed to printer Timothy C. Strong in Middlebury, Vermont. Strong moved his business to Palmyra, New York, and in 1819 Tucker left his employ. He then worked as a journeyman in Philadelphia, Baltimore, Washington, and New York. He was first a principle in printing in Jamaica, New York, with Henry C. Sleight in 1824. Two years later he started Rochester Advertiser, a daily newspaper serving the farmers of western New York, particularly the valley of the Genesee River.

The Genesee Farmer "was dignified, pious, and, in a stilted way, literary. It won the sincere good will of its constituency and some fame. Jesse Buel became an assistant editor in 1833, but soon resigned to edit the Cultivator, which had been established at Albany by the State Agricultural Society in 1834. In 1839 Tucker bought Buel's Cultivator, united the Genesee Farmer with it under the name of the Cultivator, and moved to Albany."

Son Luther Junior entered the firm in 1852 and publication expanded with Country Gentleman. Its sections included Farm, Garden & Orchard, Fireside, Current Events, Produce Markets.

In 1857, Luther went west to survey agricultural developments in other states. Through regional contributors he grew his subscriptions from several states. In 1866, given the collapse of subscriptions due to war, Country Gentleman and The Cultivator were merged.

The Cultivator is remembered for carrying articles by Yale University professor Samuel William Johnson, an analytical chemist involved in soil testing, measuring for deficiency in ammonia, lime or phosphorus.

== Scientific rhetoric ==
In January 1836, Tucker ventured to start an agricultural journal, The Monthly Farmer and Horticulturalist, "made up of selections from the Genesee Farmer (a weekly publication)". In the opening pages he gives a mission statement for the journal:

"The present may be appropriately termed the age of experiment – bold [and] persevering ... No course of proceeding, whatever may be its sanctions, is allowed to escape without investigation – no error, whatever may be its antiquity, can hope for impunity – no dogma, however venerable, but must submit to a thorough re-examination. The disposition to follow where ever truth leads, in defiance of preconceived opinions or prejudices, is becoming general, and, if tempered by caution and directed by knowledge, cannot fail to be productive of the happiest of results. ... The beneficial influence of this state of things is most apparent in the pursuits of Education and Agriculture....As the farming body ... has been intellectual and intelligent ... in exact proportion ... has been the march of national wealth and civilized society. To reduce agriculture to a science and certainty should be the object of every farmer."

"To such men as POWEL, THOMAS, BUEL, BRADLEY, COLMAN, ALLEN, STIMSON and others, men who may be considered pioneers in this country, of a system of Agriculture base on experiment, and successful beyond a precedent, the country certainly owes a large debt of gratitude. It is to the experience of such men, and the publication of their experience in farming, that the intelligent farmer owes his freedom from many absurd and injurious processes in farming, and the introduction of more rational, and thus more successful methods."

"Gypsum, or Plaster of Paris, has become so essential an item in the successful cultivation of the soil, and is so intimately blended with Clover in all our Wheat districts, that the theory of its operation, and its practical utility, will be explained and enforced."

Students Eben Horsford in Germany and John Pitkin Norton in Scotland acted as correspondents for The Cultivator, contributing monthly letters in 1844 and 5 describing their observations and scientific studies.

In 1844, The Cultivator included a reader's review of Liebig's Familiar Letters on Chemistry. An extract was quoted: "Agriculture is both a science and an art. The knowledge of all the conditions of life of vegetables, the origin of their elements, and the sources of their nourishment, forms its scientific basis."

In 1855, Samuel William Johnson had his translation of Liebig's The Relations of Chemistry to Agriculture and the Experiments of Mr. J. B. Laws published by Tucker.

In 1975, when Margaret Rossiter wrote The Emergence of Scientific Agriculture, she made over forty references to The Cultivator, indicating that Tucker succeeded in propounding his scientific rhetoric.

== Select volumes of The Cultivator ==
- 1844: The Cultivator volume one at Google Books
- 1846: The Cultivator volume three at Google Books
- 1849: The Cultivator volume six at Google Books
- 1855: The Cultivator, third series, volume three at Google Books ? m?k
- 1861: The Cultivator, third series, volume nine at Google Books
- 1896: The Cultivator & Country Gentleman, volume sixty-one at Google Books
- 1939: The Cultivator, volumes six to eight at Google Books

== See also ==
- The Rural New Yorker
