= Steinbach Hall =

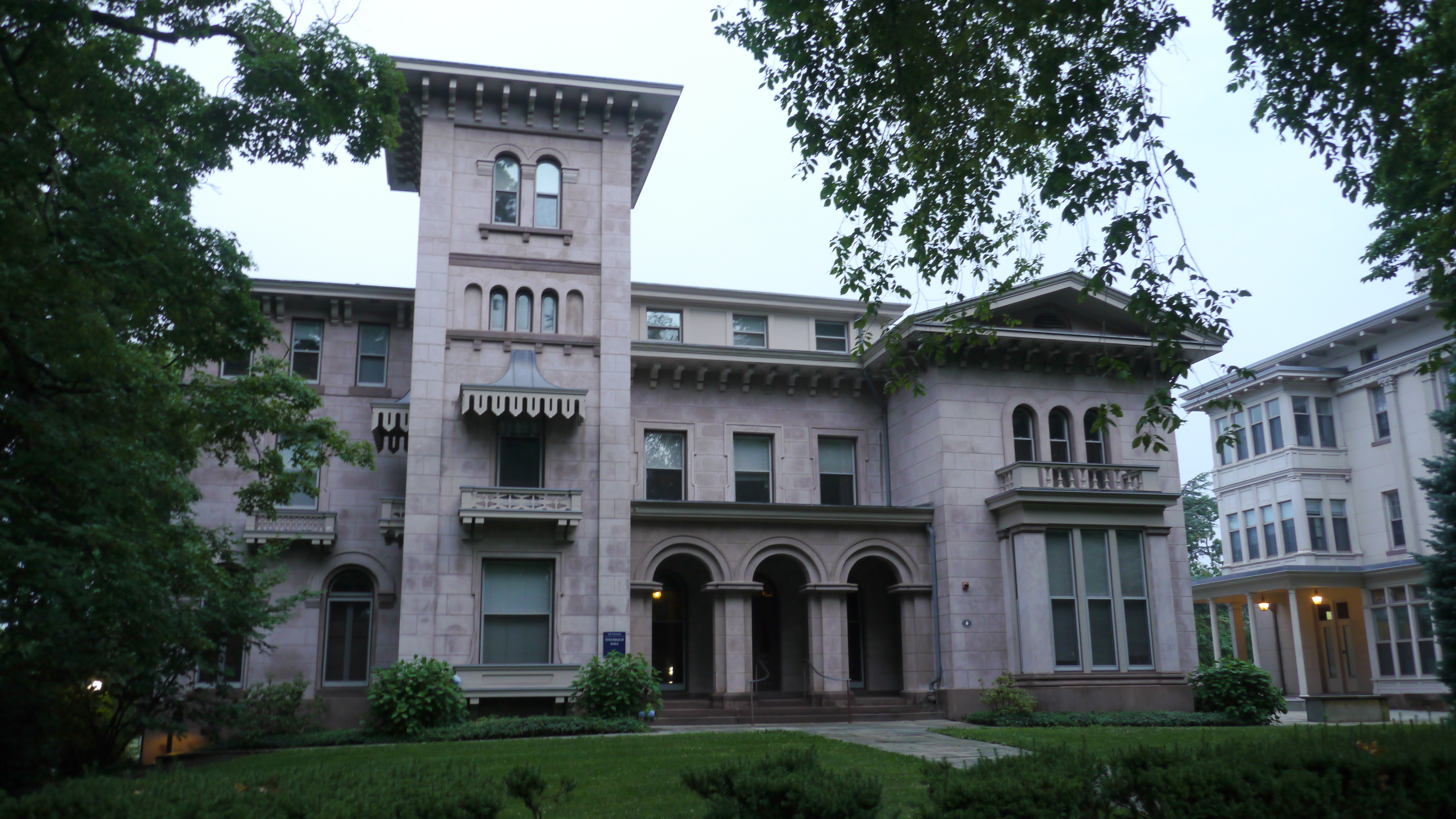
- Interactive map of the Steinbach Hall area

General information
- Location: 52 Hillhouse Avenue, New Haven, Connecticut, United States
- Coordinates: 41°18′56″N 72°55′24″W
- Construction started: 1848
- Completed: 1849
- Owner: Yale University

Design and construction
- Architect: Henry Austin

Steinbach Hall, also known as the John Pitkin Norton House, is a historic building on the campus of Yale University in New Haven, Connecticut, United States.

== History ==
The house was built in 1848–49 as a private residence for John Pitkin Norton, a science professor at Yale University.

It was purchased by Yale University in 1923. It was home to the Yale School of Management until 2015, when the Department of Astronomy moved into the building.

== Architectural significance ==
The house was designed by architect Henry Austin as an Italian villa. It includes "flat and semicircular arch motifs in window openings, bracketed cornices, and recessed front entry behind arcade with semicircular arches."

It was "remodelled" by architect Edward Larrabee Barnes in 1979. It has been listed on the National Register of Historic Places as a contributing property to the Hillhouse Avenue Historic District since September 13, 1985.
