= James Dwight Dana House =

Historic house in Connecticut, United States

- U.S. National Register of Historic Places
- U.S. National Historic Landmark
- U.S. Historic district – Contributing property
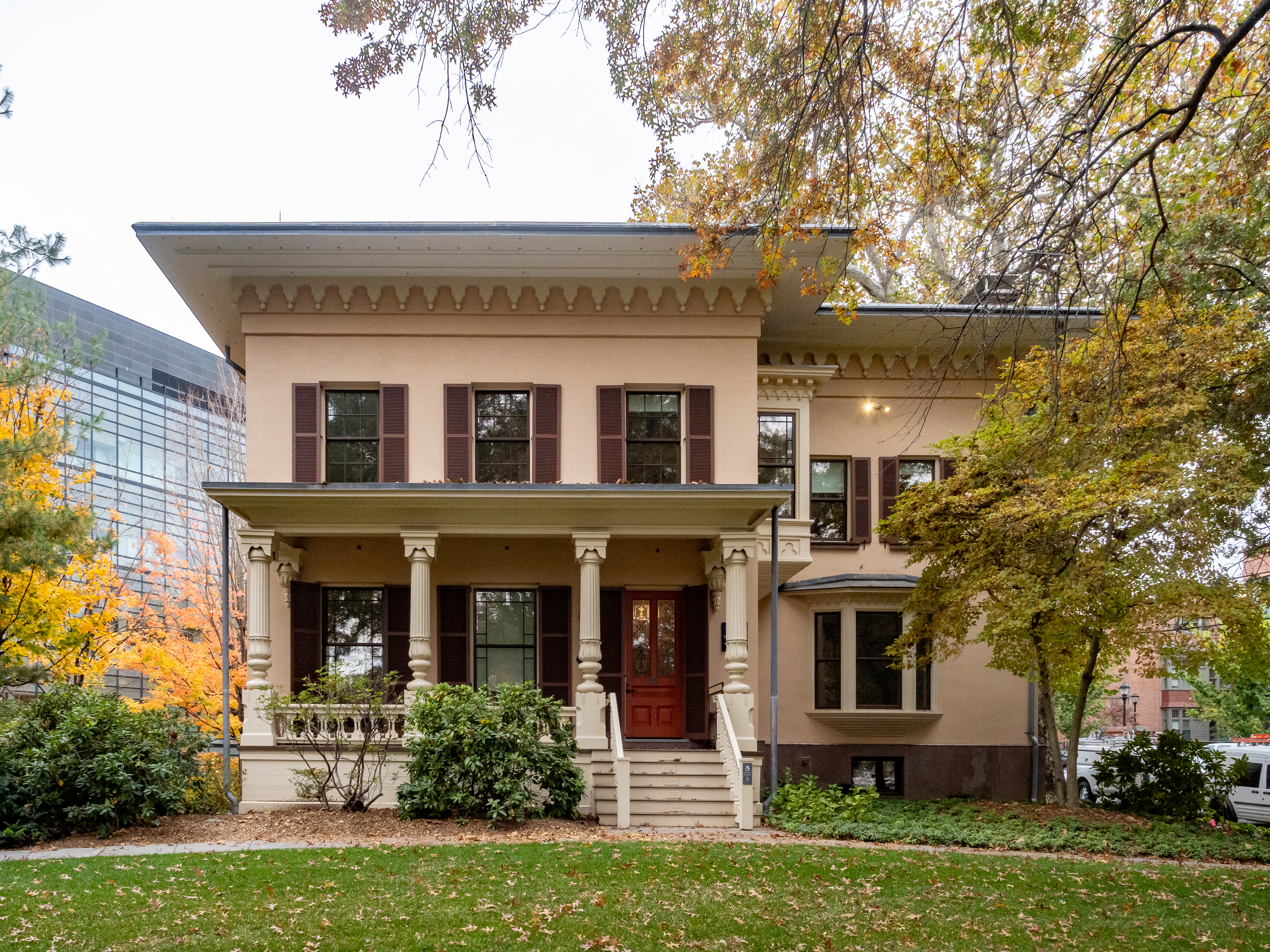
- 2024

- Location within Connecticut Location within the United States
- Location: 24 Hillhouse Avenue, New Haven, Connecticut
- Coordinates: 41°18′48.24″N 72°55′26.76″W
- Built: 1849
- Architect: Henry Austin
- Architectural style: Italianate
- Part of: Hillhouse Avenue Historic District (ID85002507)
- NRHP reference No.: 66000874

Significant dates
- Added to NRHP: October 15, 1966
- Designated NHL: January 12, 1965
- Designated CP: September 13, 1985

The James Dwight Dana House, also known as the Dana House, is a historic 19th-century Italianate house at 24 Hillhouse Avenue in New Haven, Connecticut, in the United States. This building, designed by New Haven architect Henry Austin, was the home of Yale University geology professor James Dwight Dana (1813–95). It was declared a National Historic Landmark in 1965 for its association with Dana, who produced the first published works emphasizing that the study of geology was a much broader discipline than the examination of individual rocks.

== Description and history ==
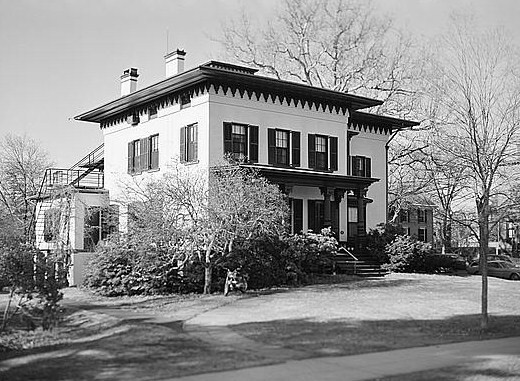
Dana house in 1967

The Dana House consists of three roughly rectangular painted brick sections, 2 1/2 stories in height, with a low-pitch hip roof. The main block, apparently adapted from a stock pattern by New Haven architect Henry Austin, has a three-bay front facade, with a single-story porch extending across its width, supported by turned posts. The building's roof has typical Italianate wide eaves, with a wooden soffit and corbelled brickwork arches underneath. A square cupola rises above the main block. Additions on 1896 and 1905 extended the house to the north and east, stylistically sympathetic to the main block. The interior has retained much of its original handiwork.

The house was built in 1848-49 for James Dwight Dana and his bride Henrietta Silliman by her father, Benjamin Silliman, one of Yale's first professors of science. The design by Austin is not particularly elaborate or individually distinctive, as evidenced by the existence of two similar houses in the region. The house was purchased by Yale in 1962, and was the longtime home of the Department of Statistics & Data Science. It now serves the Yale Institute for Social and Policy Studies. It was renovated by the university in 1996 and in 2024.

The house was designated a National Historic Landmark in 1965, and listed on the National Register of Historic Places in 1966. It is a contributing building in the Hillhouse Avenue Historic District, which was defined in 1985 to extend south of Trumbull Street to include this property.

James Dwight Dana's education in geology, in addition to his studies with Professor Silliman, extended to the four-year United States Exploring Expedition (1838–42), in which Dana served as the staff geologist and mineralogist, and exposed him to a wide-ranging variety of geological formations and minerals. In addition to numerous reports and articles on the material from this expedition, Dana in 1862 produced the Manual of Geology, the first major work to describe the study of geology as an investigation of the processes that produced the landforms and minerals we see. More than just describing how individual types of rocks and minerals forms, he expanded the view to include descriptions of how major landforms such as mountains and valleys formed.

== See also ==
- List of National Historic Landmarks in Connecticut
- National Register of Historic Places listings in New Haven, Connecticut
