= Henry Austin (architect) =

American architect

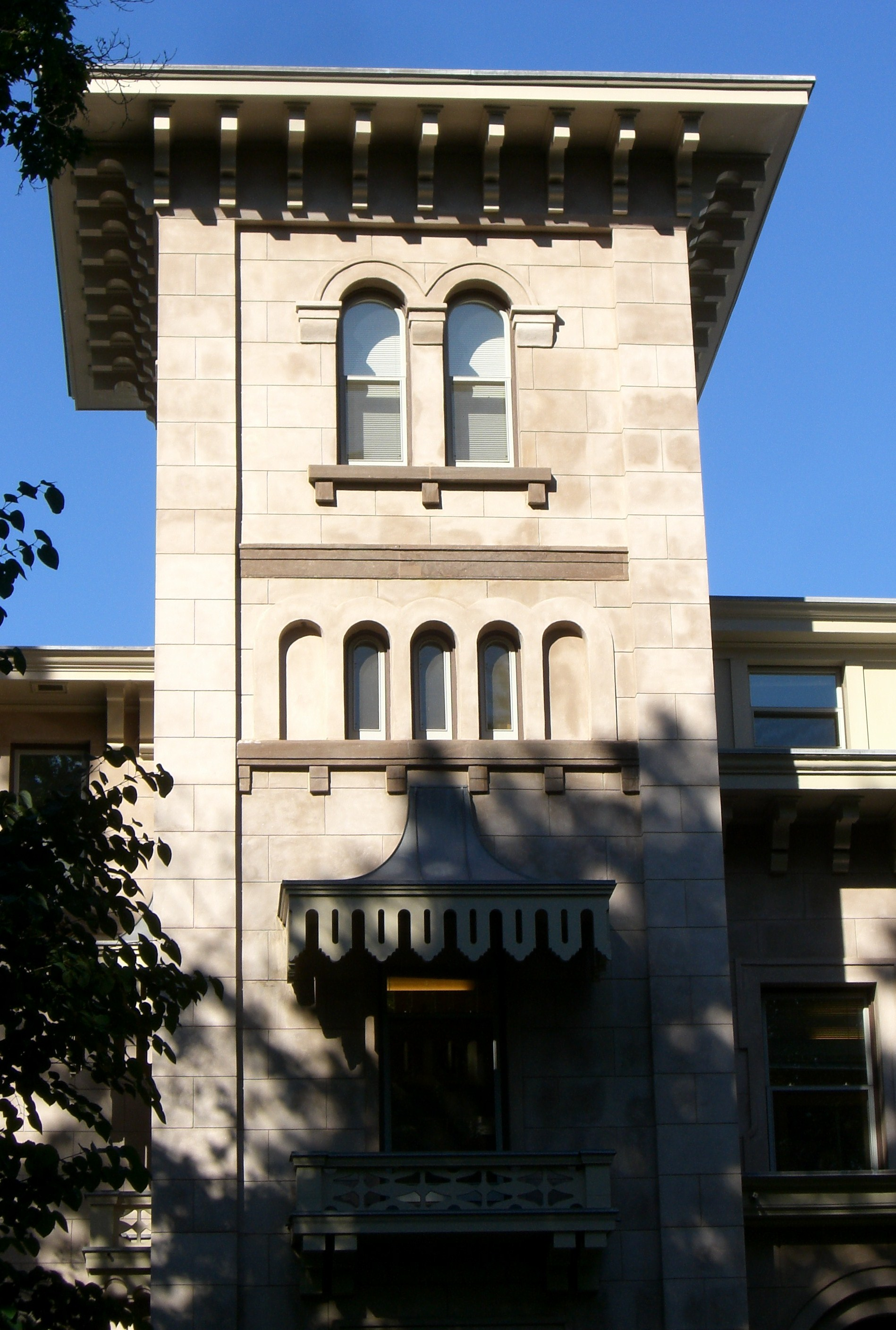
- Tower of the John Pitkin Norton House, one of Austin's most developed works.
- Born: December 4, 1804; Mt. Carmel, Connecticut
- Died: December 17, 1891 (aged 87); New Haven, Connecticut
- Occupation: Architect
- Buildings: Yale College Library (Dwight Hall); Grove Street Cemetery Gates; James Dwight Dana House; John Pitkin Norton House; Victoria Mansion; New Haven City Hall

Henry Austin (December 4, 1804 – December 17, 1891) was a prominent and prolific American architect based in New Haven, Connecticut. He practiced for more than fifty years and designed many public buildings and homes primarily in the New Haven area. His most significant years of production seem to be the 1840s and 1850s.

== Life and practice ==
The paucity of precise information concerned with Austin and a lack of many personal papers (such as diaries or letters) makes a complete biography of his life difficult to write. Austin was born in Hamden, Connecticut, in 1804, the son of Daniel and Adah (Dorman) Austin. He first seems to have worked as a carpenter's apprentice and then began his career in architecture in association with Ithiel Town and Alexander Jackson Davis, although the nature of his relationship to Town and Davis has not been ascertained. In 1837, he opened his own office in Hartford, evidenced by newspaper advertisements. In Hartford, he designed the tower of Christ Church Cathedral (1838), the Wadsworth Athenaeum with Town and Davis (1842, his involvement is uncertain), the demolished gothic-revival Kellogg house (1841), and the long-gone 1842 building for St. John's Episcopal Church; he also became associated at this time with Nelson Hotchkiss a New Haven real-estate developer and designed with him villas along "Park Row" in Trenton, New Jersey, probably his first major commission.

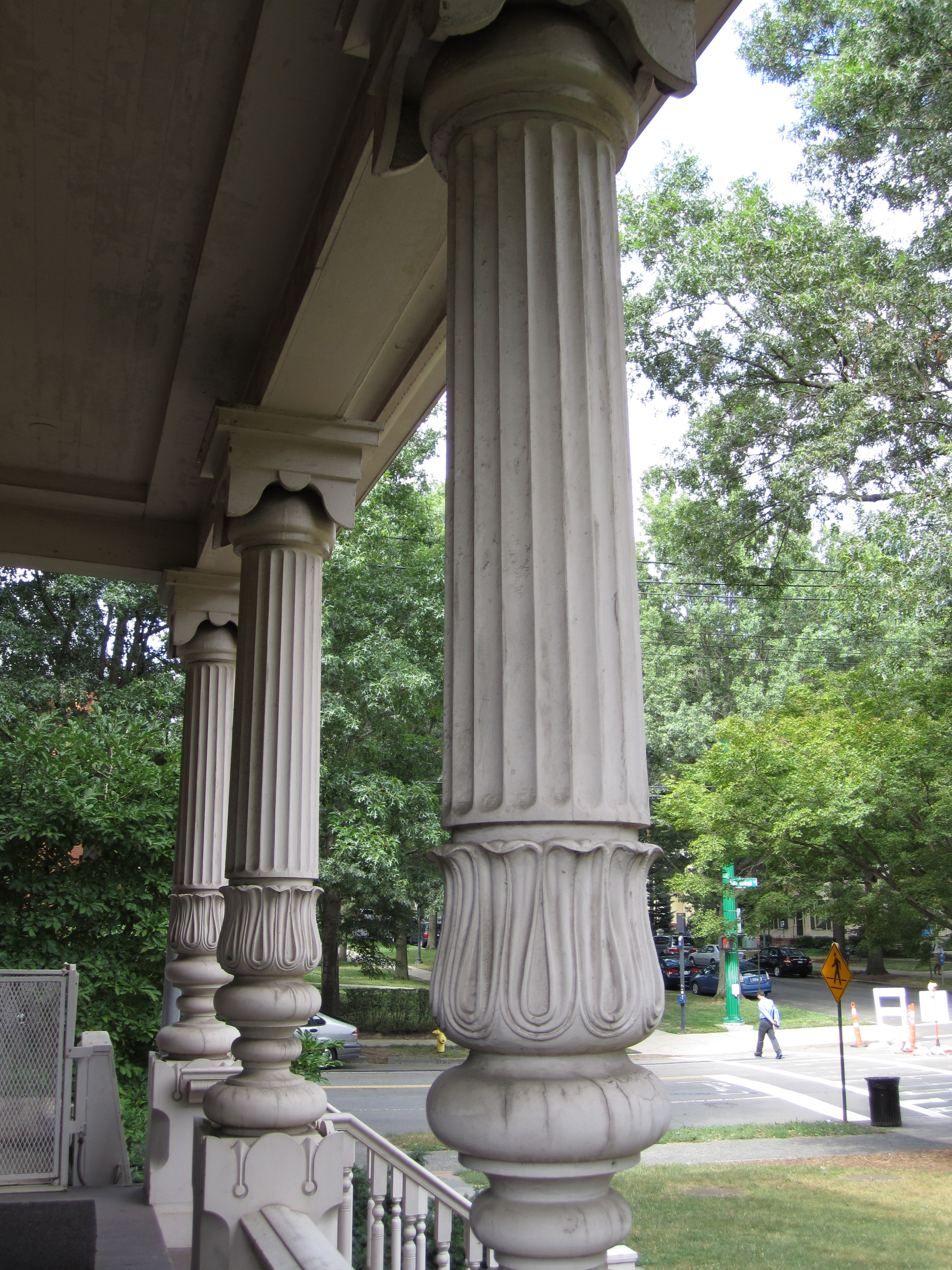
Henry Austin was particularly enamored of the so-called candelabra columns and introduced them into the American architectural vocabulary. These examples are from the Dana House in New Haven.

In 1841, he moved his practice to New Haven where his first significant commission was the now-demolished, Greek Revival George Gabriel House (1841). In New Haven, Austin's style diversified; in one ad, Austin claimed he could design buildings "in every variety of architectural style". He worked in a range of styles popular in the nineteenth century including Gothic, Italianate, Egyptian and Moorish Revival. In some buildings, he employed an eclectic mix of styles, creating varied, exotic formi. His New Haven work left a lasting impression on the domestic architecture of the then-developing real estate projects in the areas of Wooster Square and Hillhouse Avenue. In Wooster Square he designed the Italianate James E. English House (1845), the exotic Indian/Moorish Willis Bristol House (1845), the Nelson Hotchkiss House (1850), and the irregular Italianate villa Oliver B. King House (1852). On Hillhouse Avenue he worked on the James Dwight Dana House (1848) and the John Pitkin Norton House (1849), as well as remodeled the Greek Revival Ithiel Town House of 1836 for Joseph E. Sheffield in 1859 (demolished), encasing Town's structure in an exuberant Italianate shell. In New Haven, Austin made the so-called candelabra column (a column inspired by Indian architecture consisting of superimposed vegetal layers) his signature, as well as elaborate Indian/Moorish lambrequins over windows, and thick vegetal anthemia and tendrils over window surrounds. Other significant works in New Haven include the Grove Street Cemetery Gate in Egyptian Revival (1848–49), Dwight Hall at Yale (1842–1845), the Townsend City Savings Bank (demolished, 1852), the Palladium Building (formerly Young Men's Institute, 1855) and the strange Moorish New Haven Railroad Station (demolished, 1848). His most significant non-residential commission in New Haven was the City Hall (1860), a polychrome, asymmetrical, Gothic Revival structure, which, although significantly altered in the 1980s, still maintains Austin's facade and some interior decorative features.

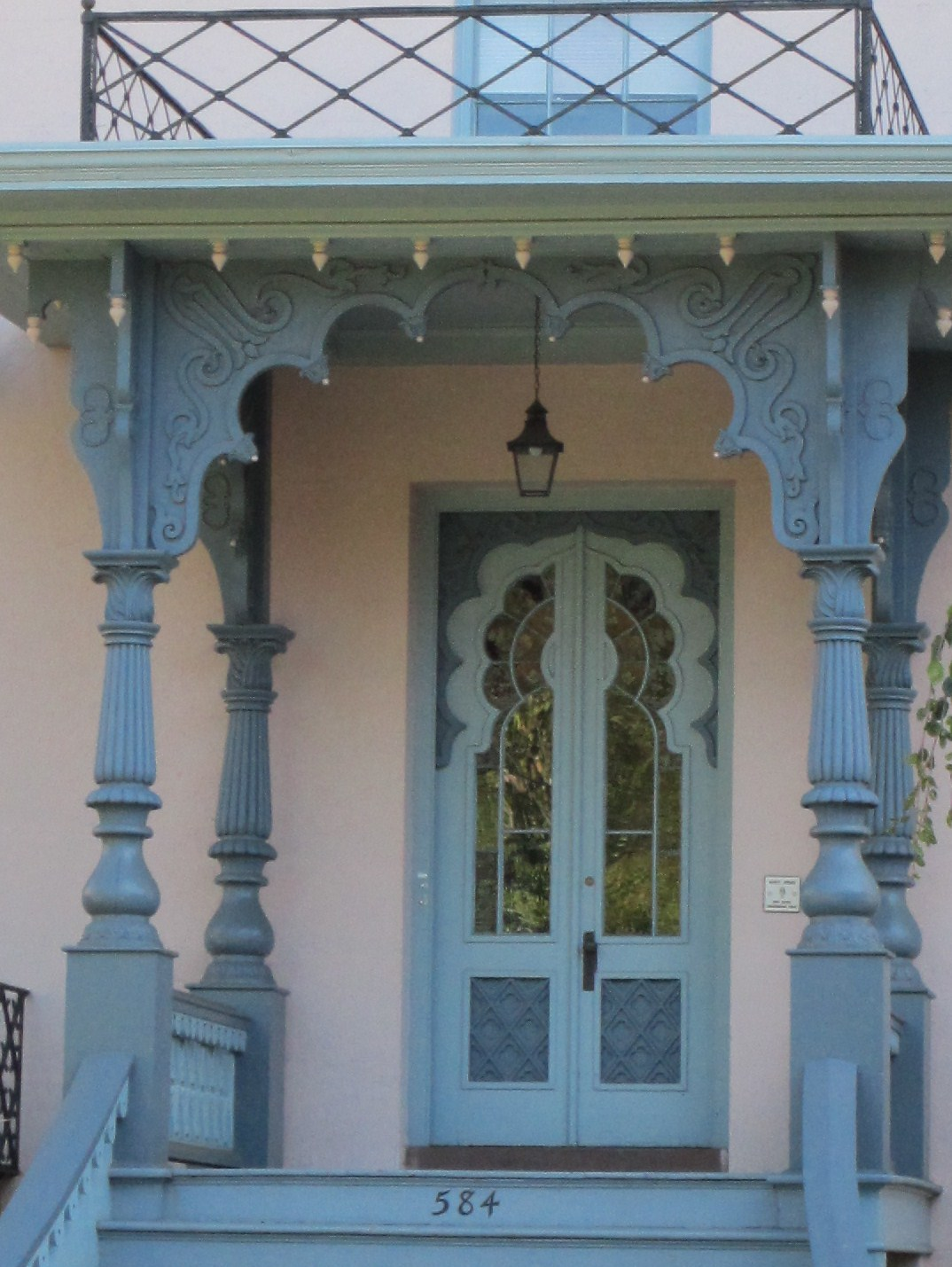
Indian architecture made a deep impression on Austin and found its way into much of his detail work. This is the porch from the Willis Bristol House in New Haven.

Austin also worked in other regions and states. In Connecticut, he designed churches in Gothic revival and Italianate styles in Northford (Congregational 1845), Waterbury (St. John's Episcopal Church, 1846), Kent (First Congregational 1849), Plainville (Congregational 1850), and Seymour (Trinity Episcopal, 1858). Perhaps his most significant out-of-state commission was the Morse-Libby House (Victoria Mansion) in Portland, Maine, 1857–1860, for Sylvester Ruggles Morse. This large, elaborate Italianate mansion in brownstone is considered one of Austin's best works and has been called "one of the culminating domestic designs of the antebellum years, and of the Italianate villa in general." One of his last major commissions was for the gothic, brownstone library (Rich Hall, 1866–68), now Patricelli '92 Theater, at Wesleyan University in Middletown, Connecticut.

After the 1860s, Austin's style changed with the times, incorporating structures in the Second Empire and Stick styles. In 1868, he constructed two Second Empire houses on Prospect Street in New Haven for Oliver Winchester and John M. Davies. The Winchester House has been demolished, but the Davies house remains, having been restored by Yale and renamed the Betts House. Austin's son, Fred, joined his father's practice in later years, but the firm did not survive long after Austin's death. Throughout his later years, Austin maintained control of his firm and was famous as he aged for wearing a dark brown wig. He was the chairman of the Board of Commissioners of Public Buildings in New Haven at the time of his death; he also served on the New Haven city council in 1854 and belonged to the Masons for fifty years. In recent years, curiosity has been raised about Austin's professional relationship to his New Haven contemporary, Sidney Mason Stone, but, other than minor references to civic duties they shared, there seems to be little documentation available to fuel such an inquiry.

Austin was married twice, first to Harriet M. Hooker, then to Jane Hempstead, and had four children who survived into adulthood, Willard, Henry, David, and Fred. He died in 1891 in New Haven and is interred in Grove Street Cemetery, the gates of which he designed.

== Selected works ==
* indicates demolished or significantly altered buildings

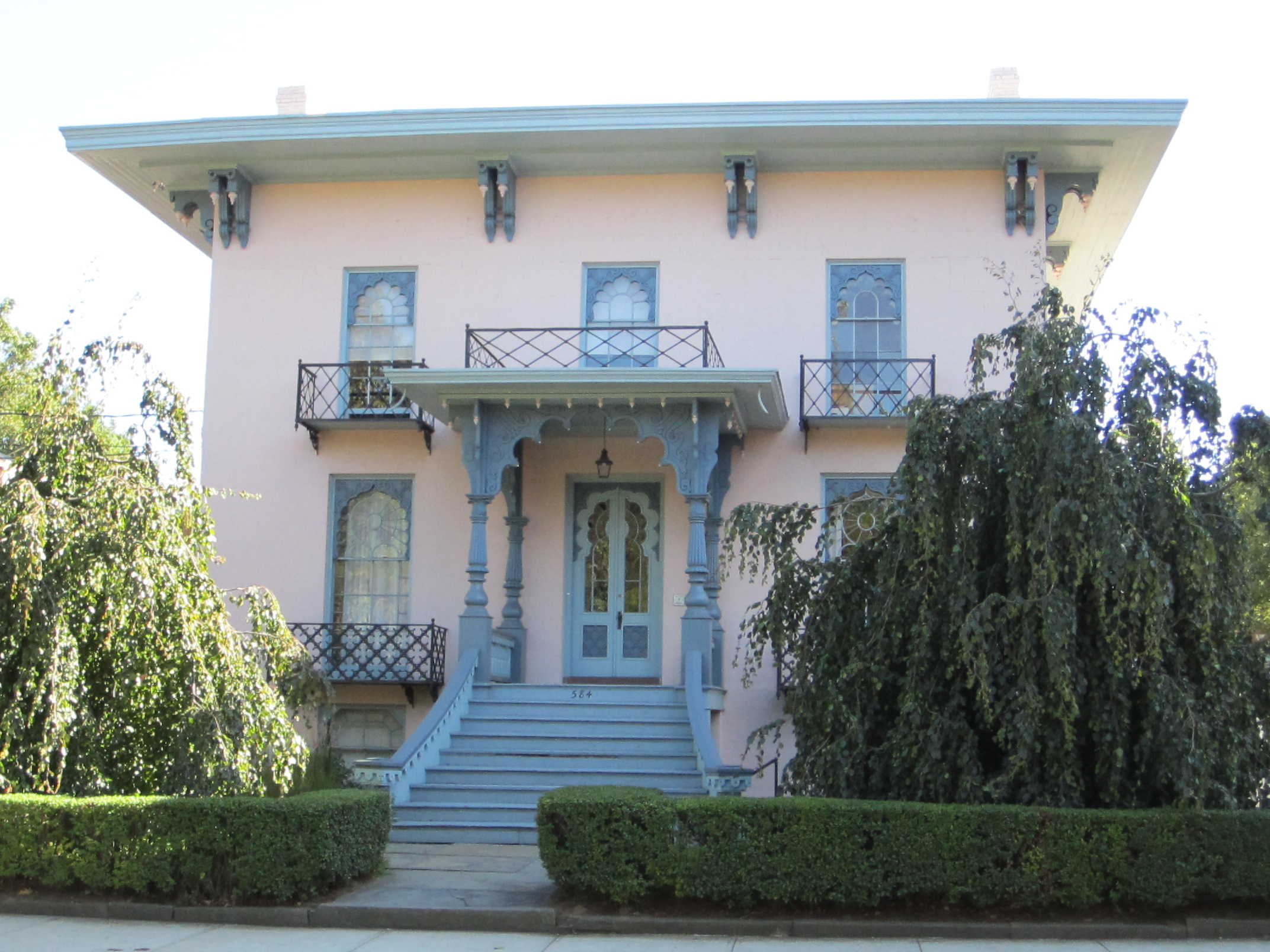
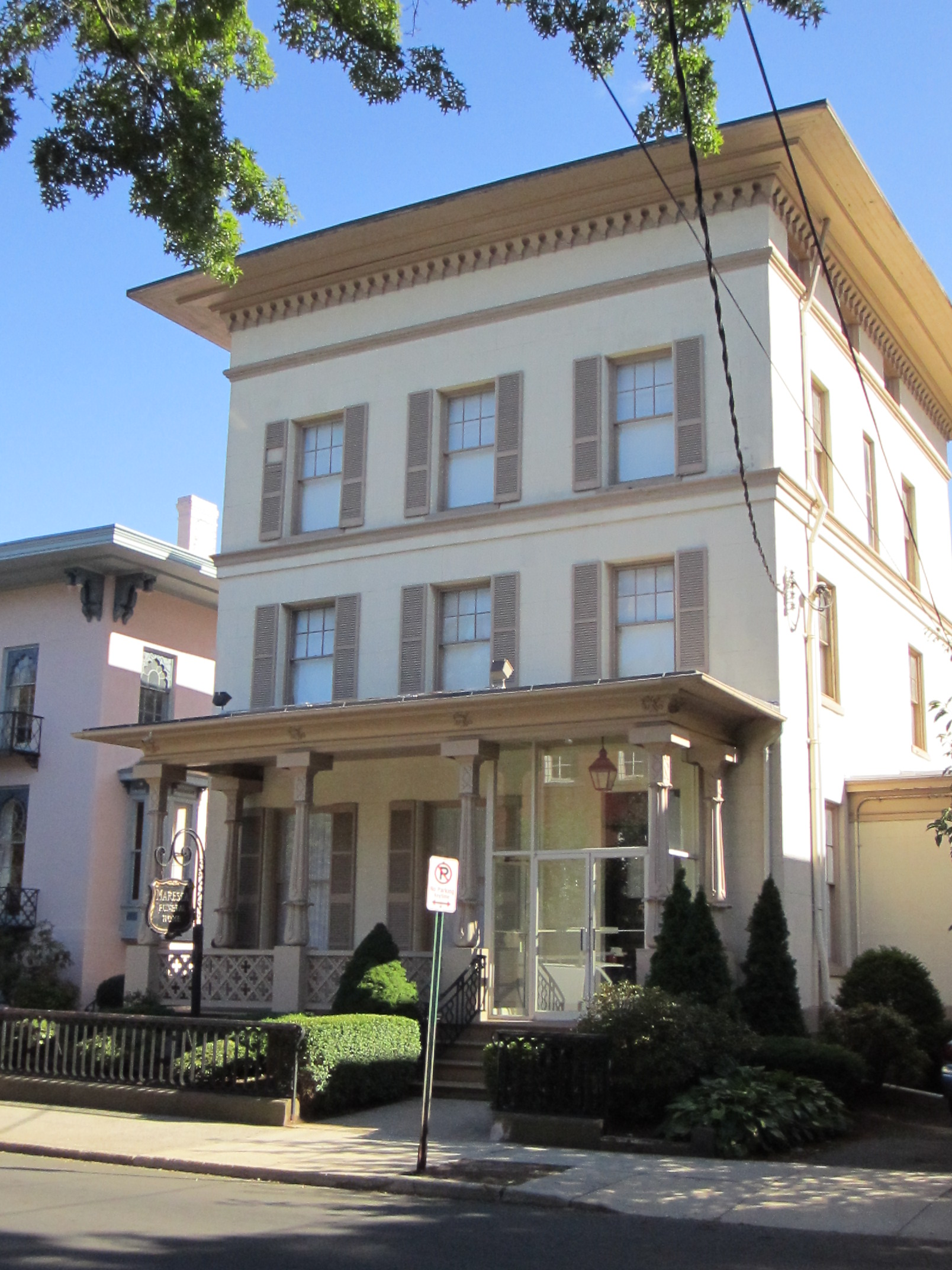
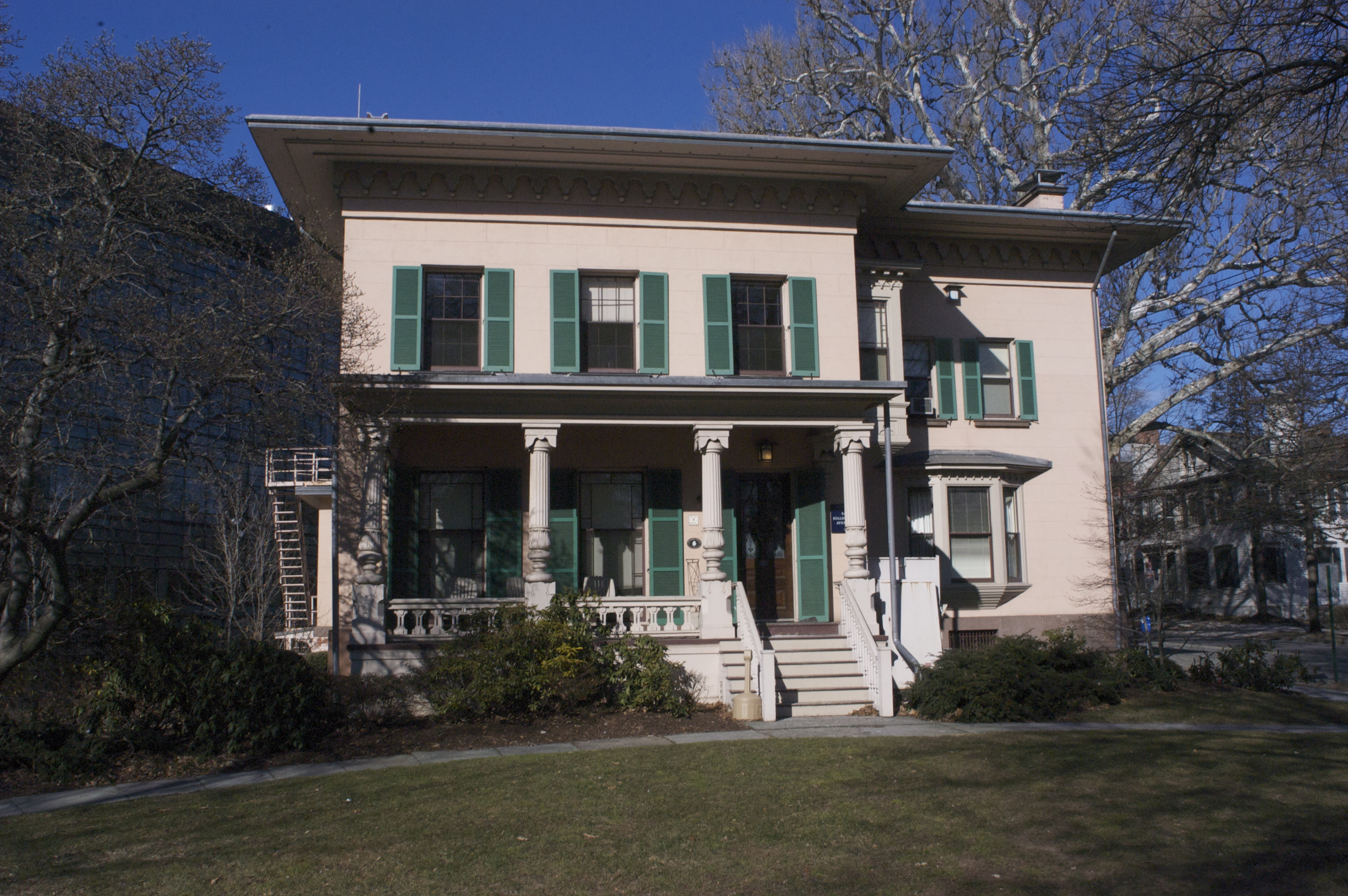
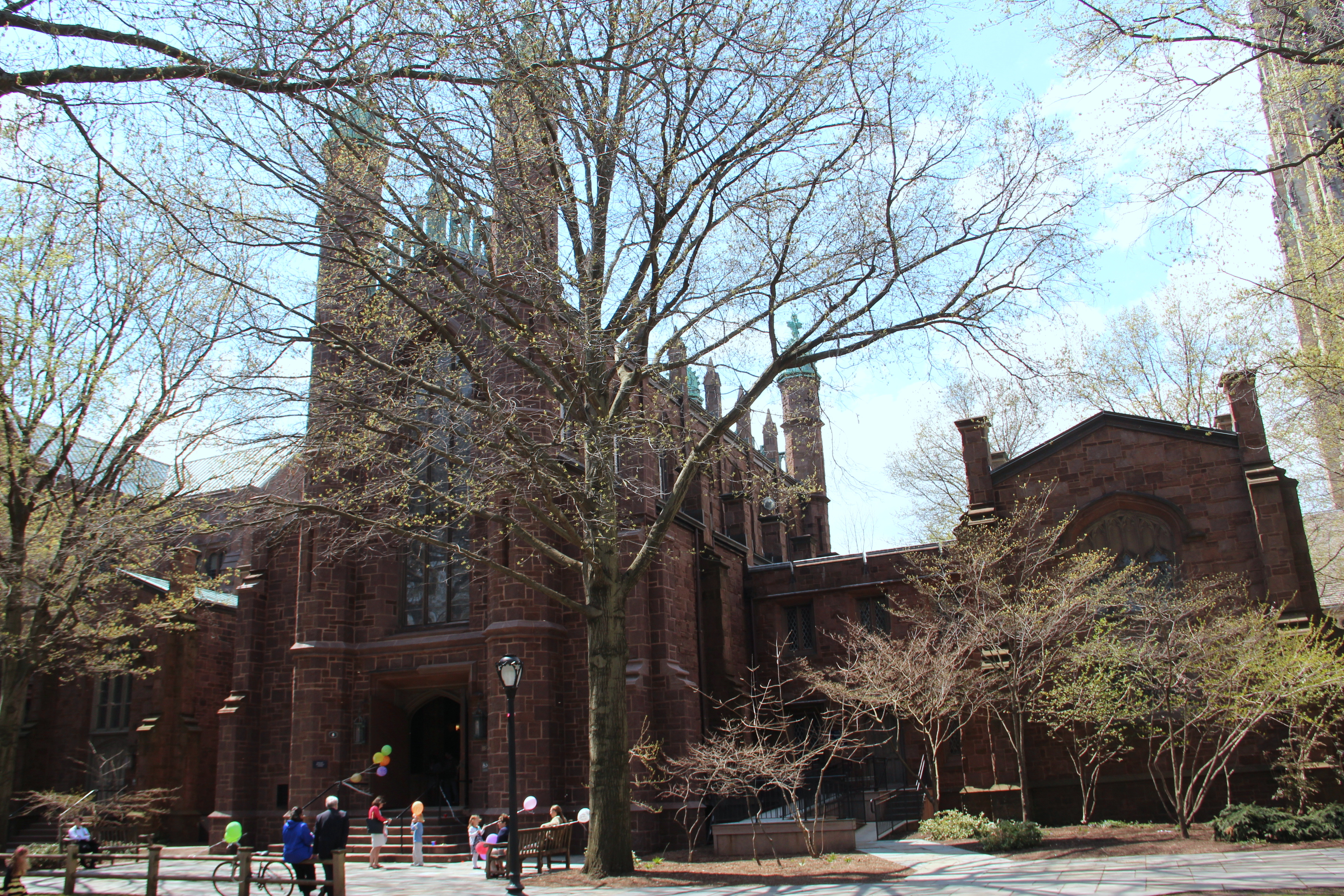
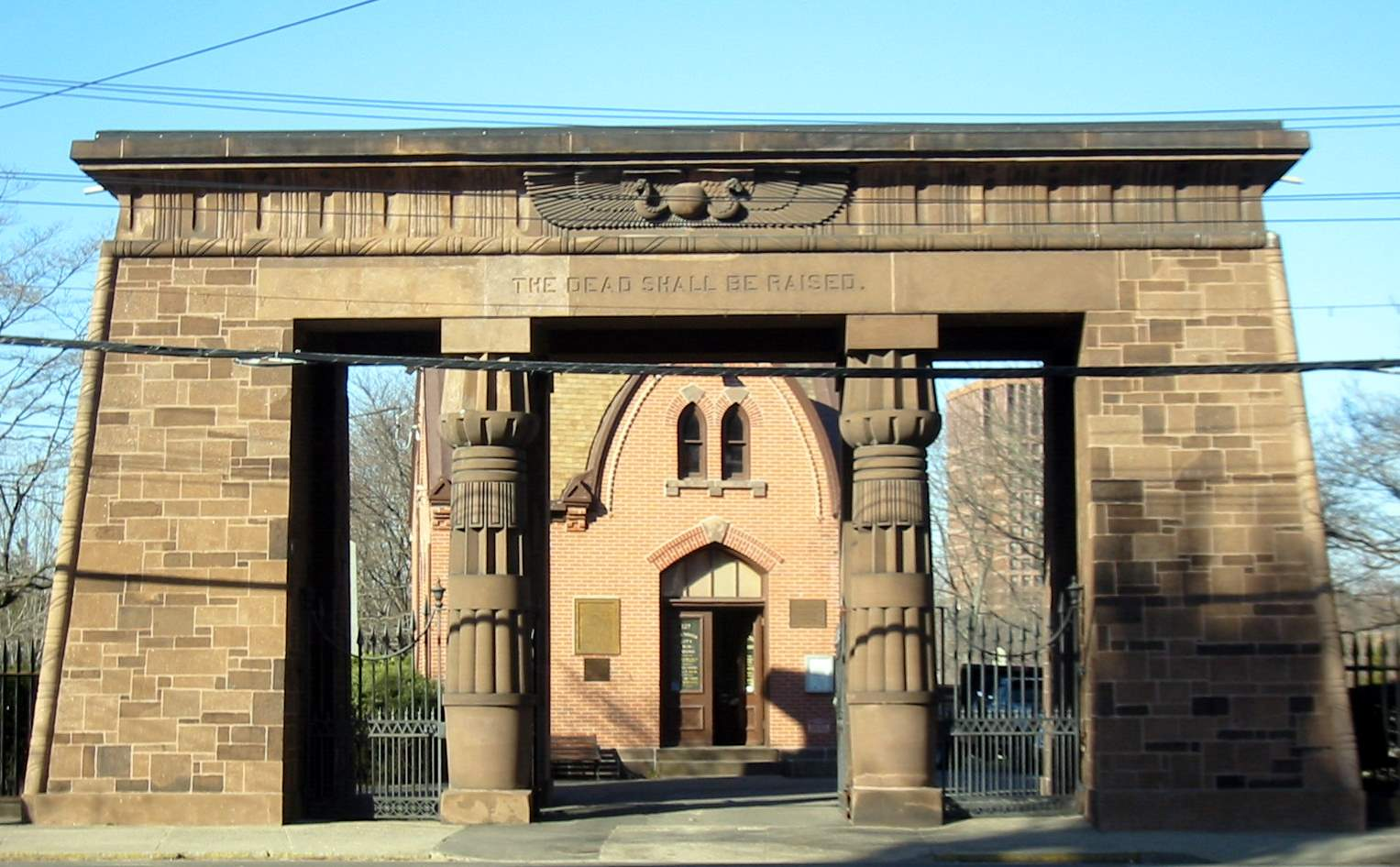
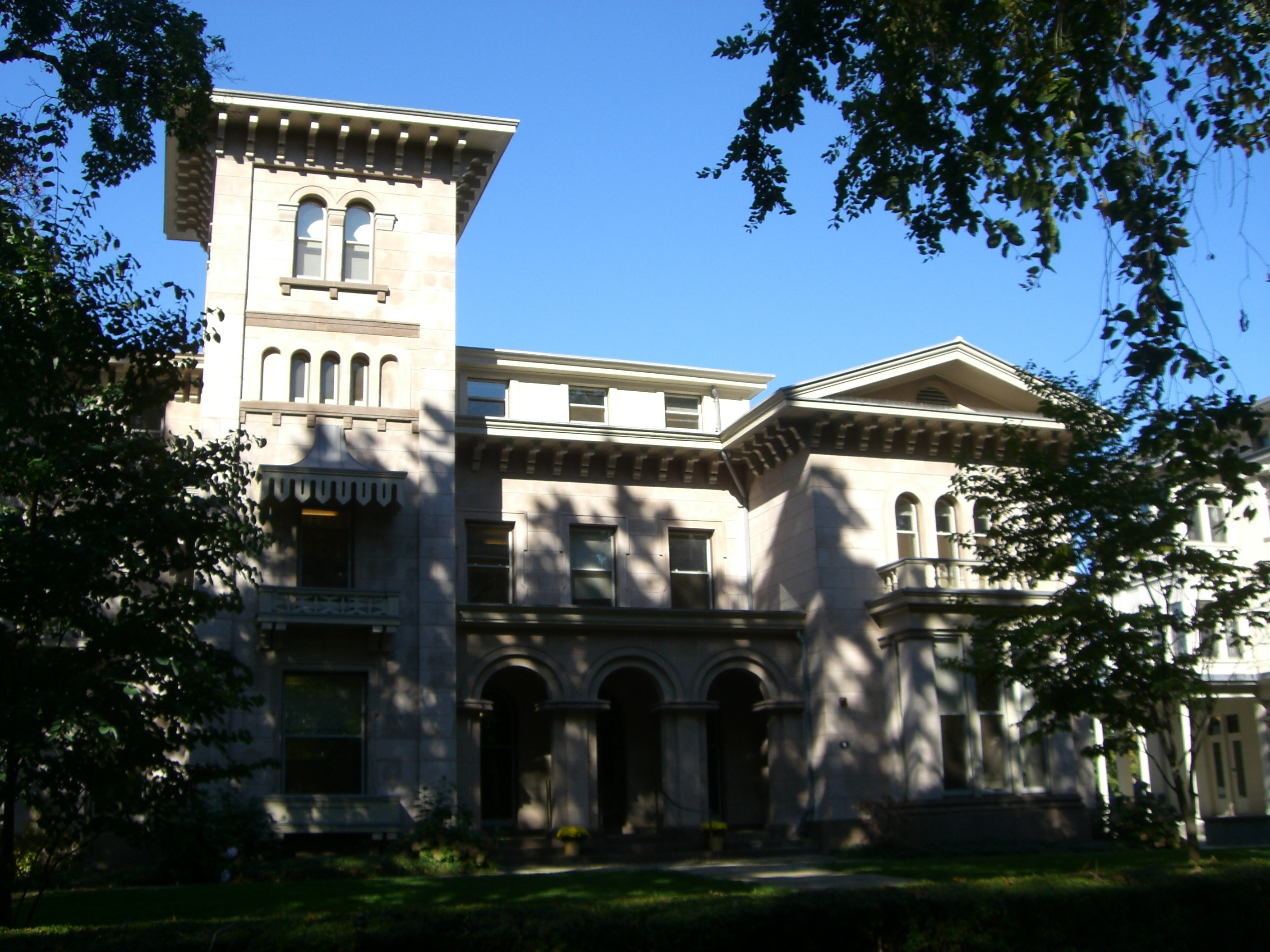
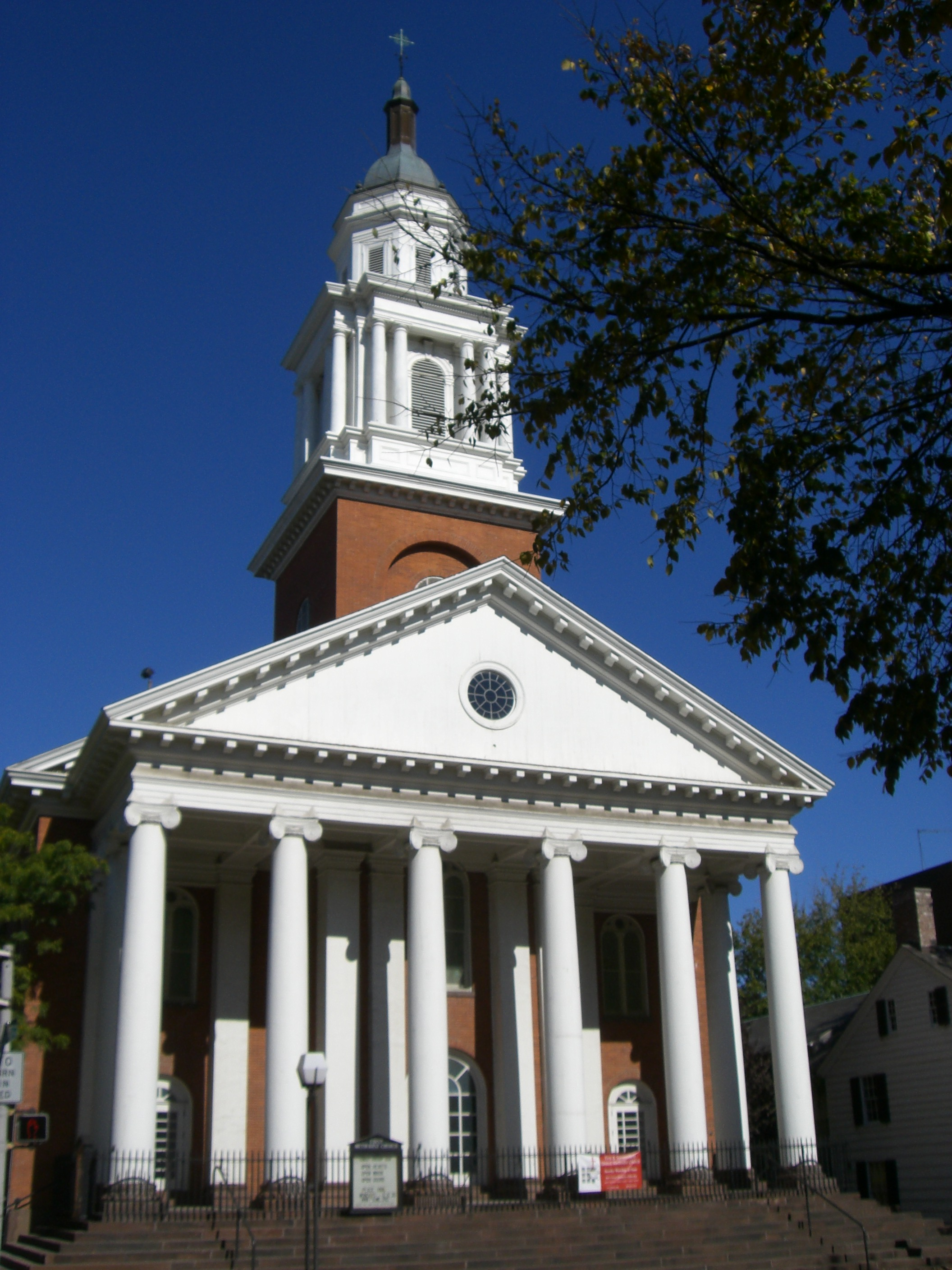
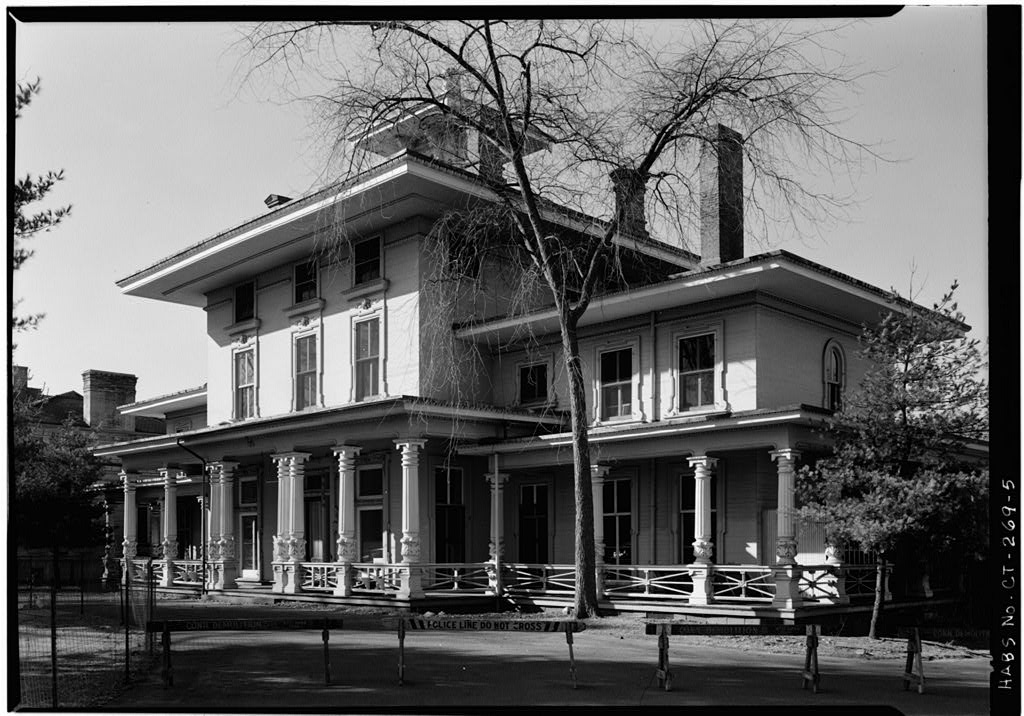
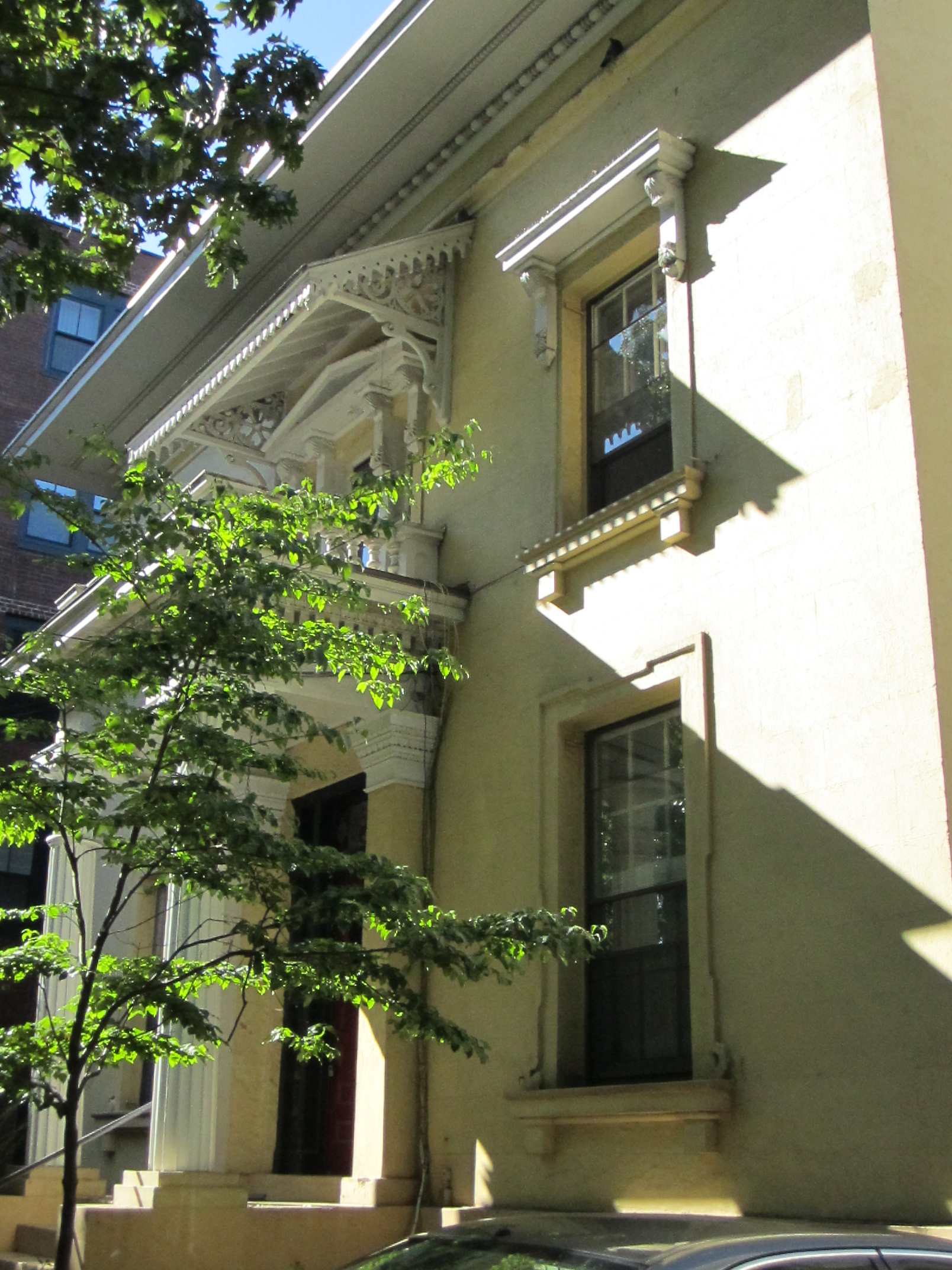
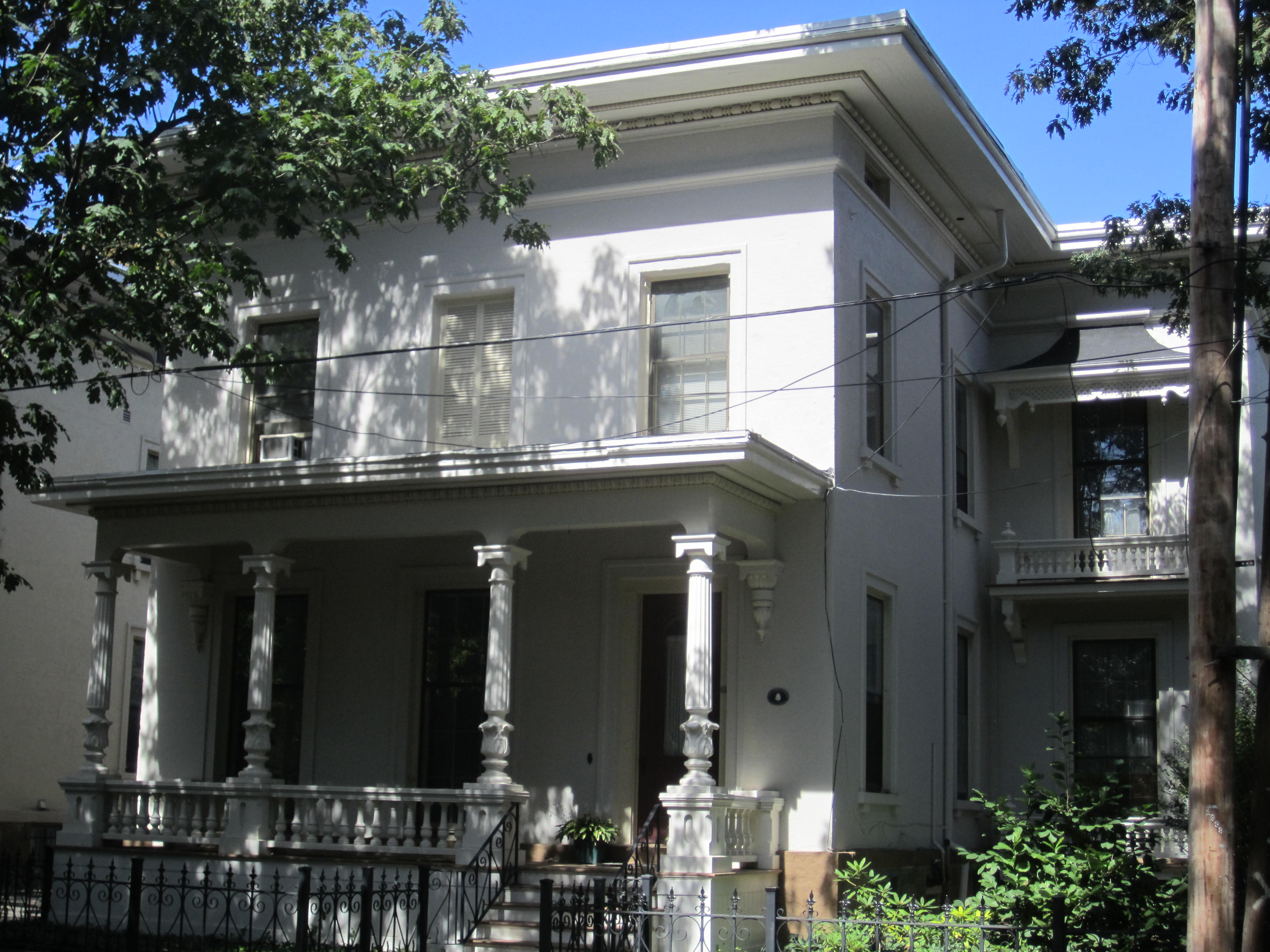
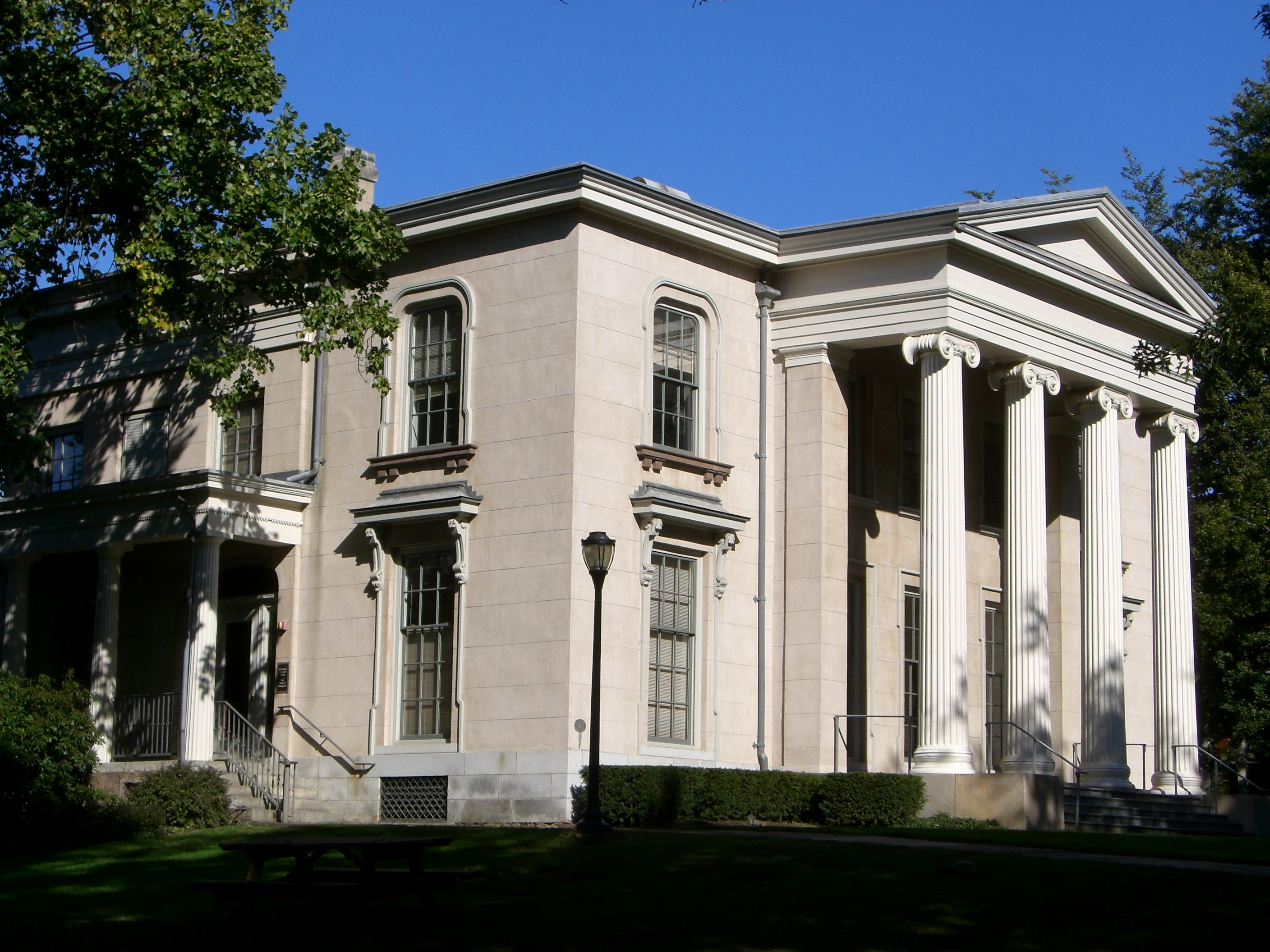
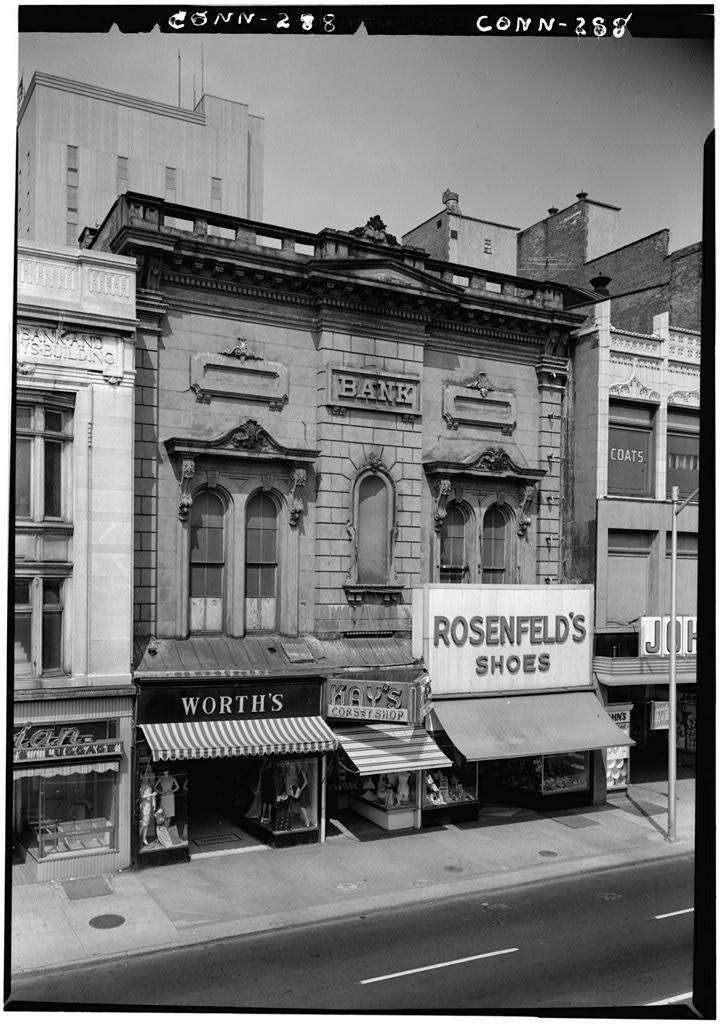
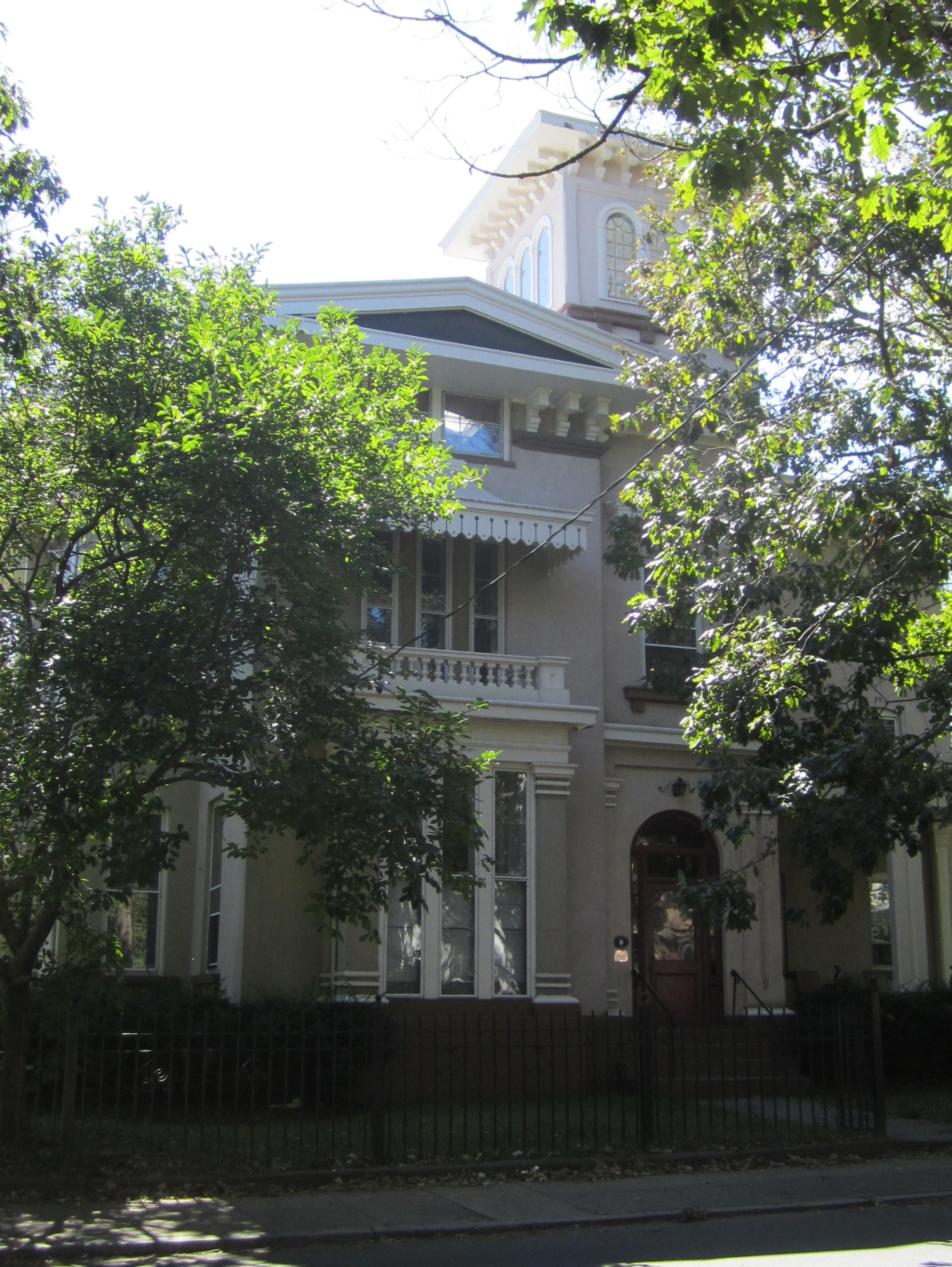
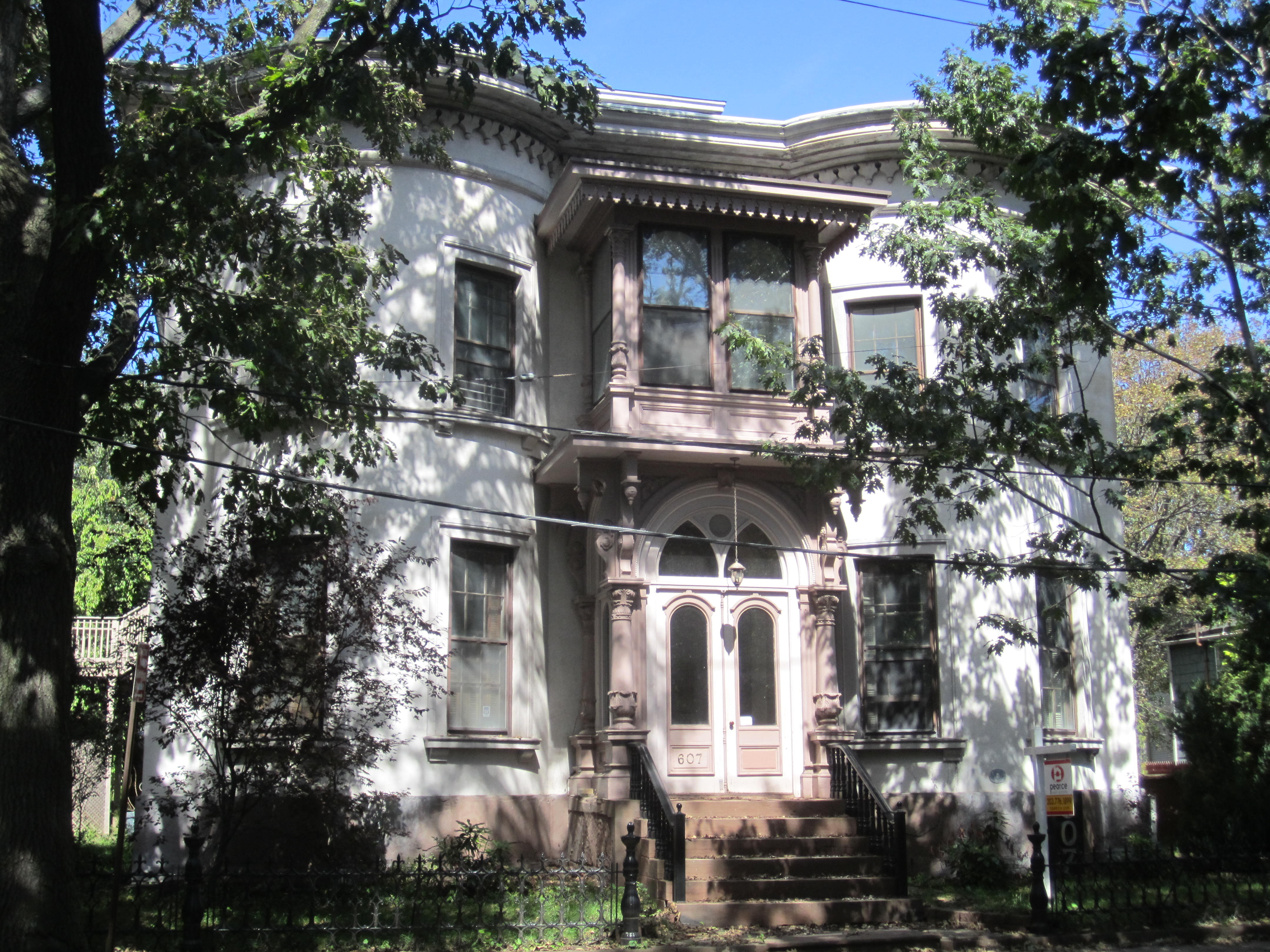
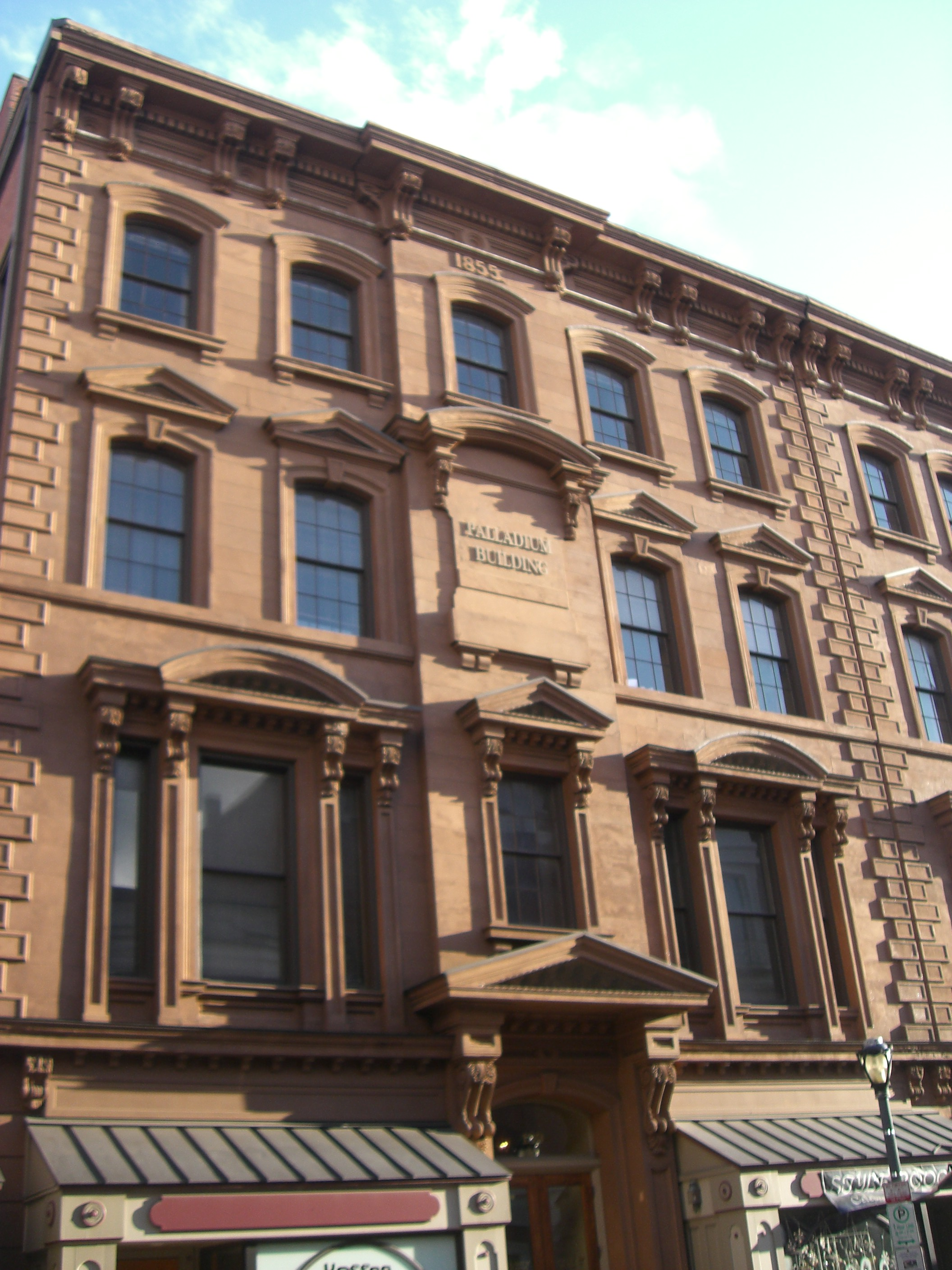
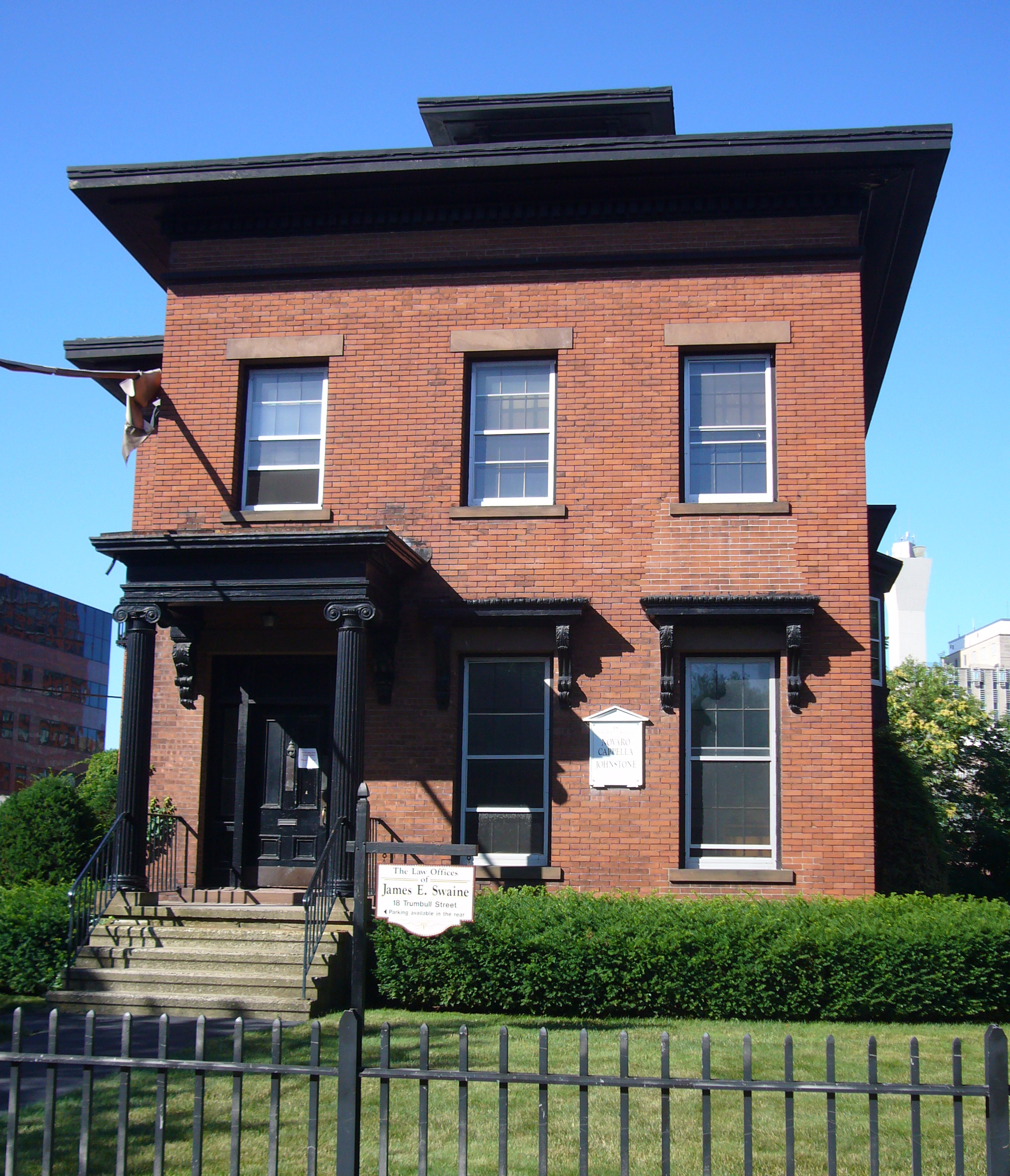
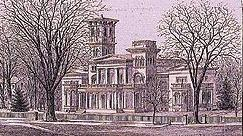
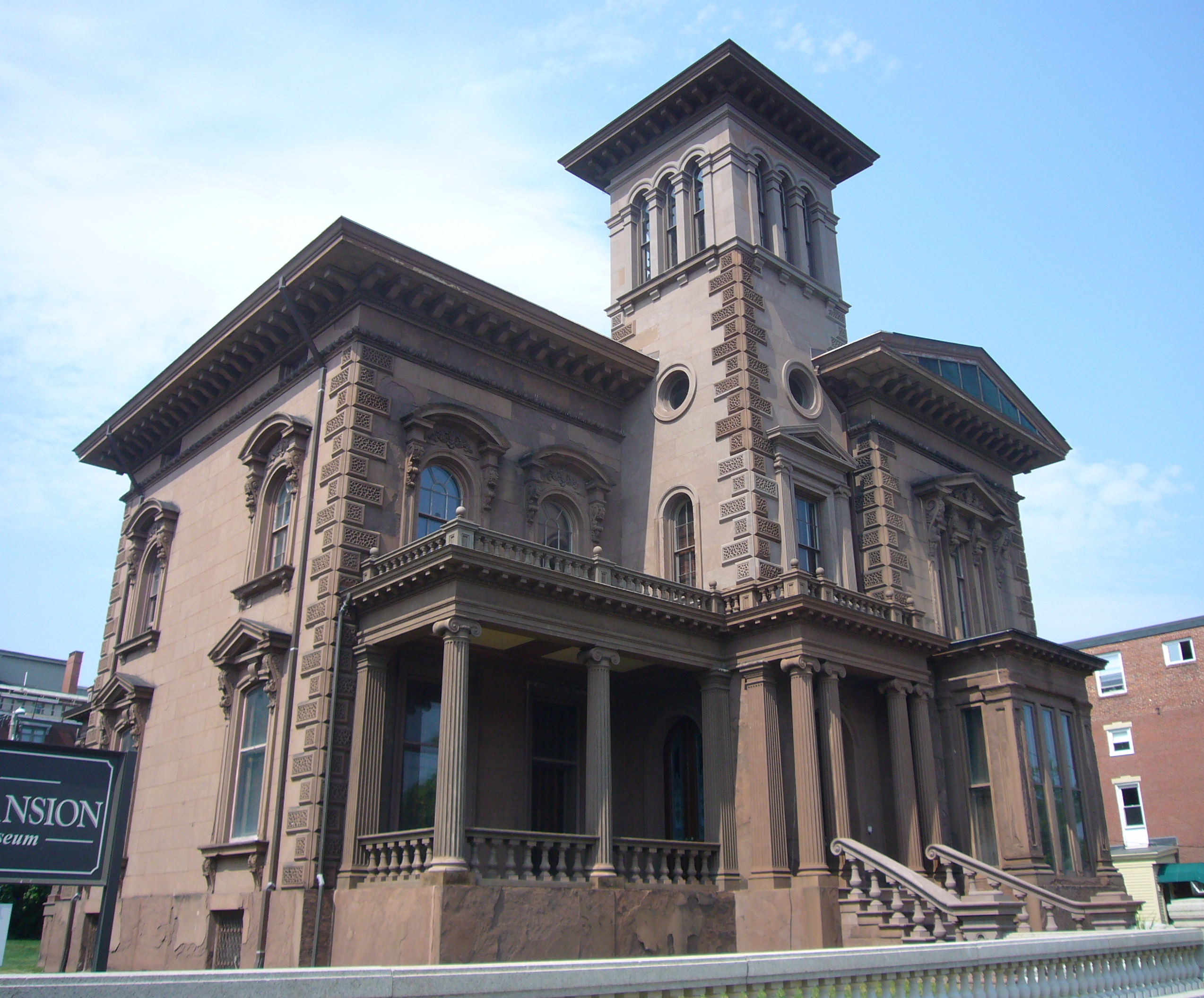
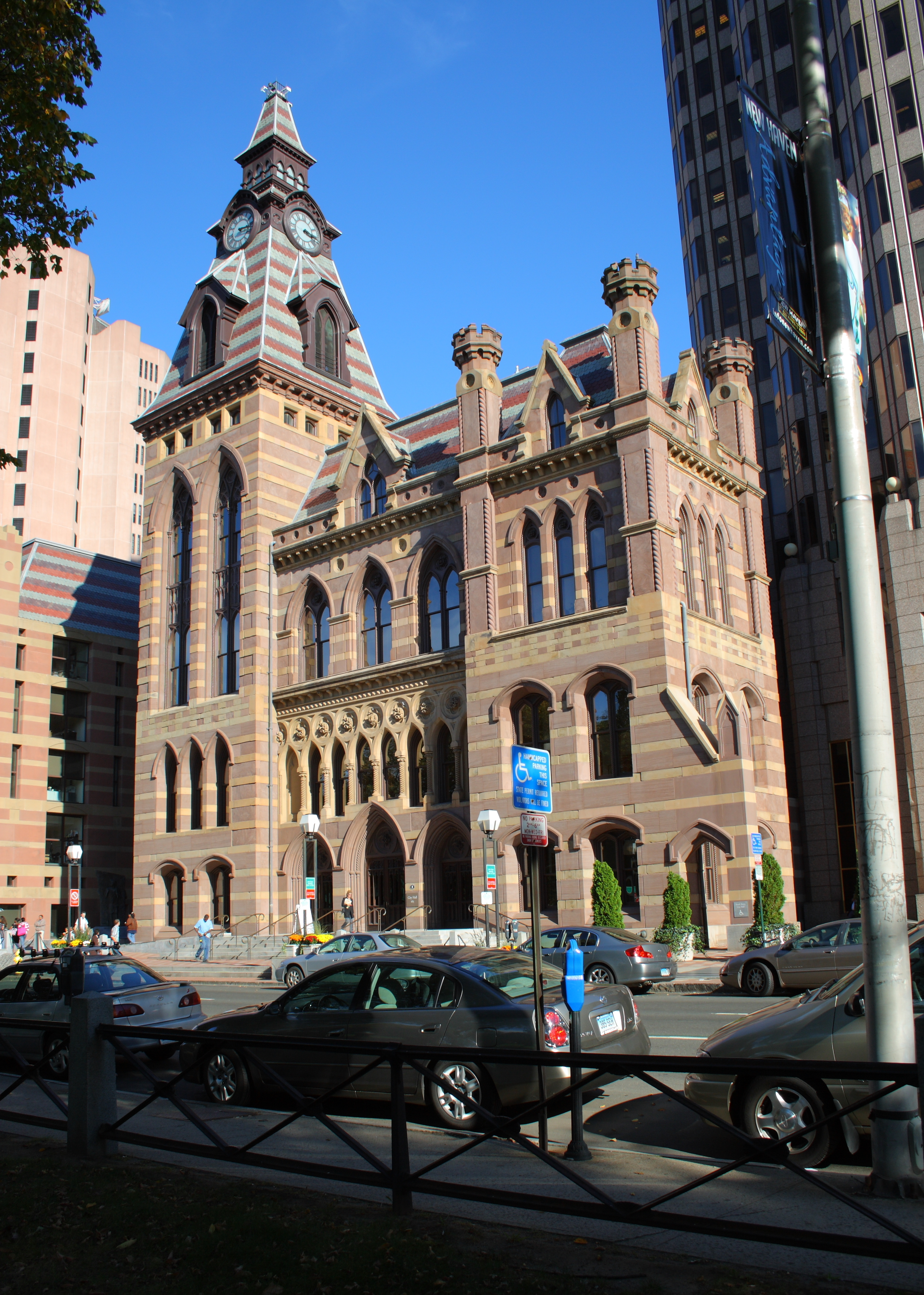
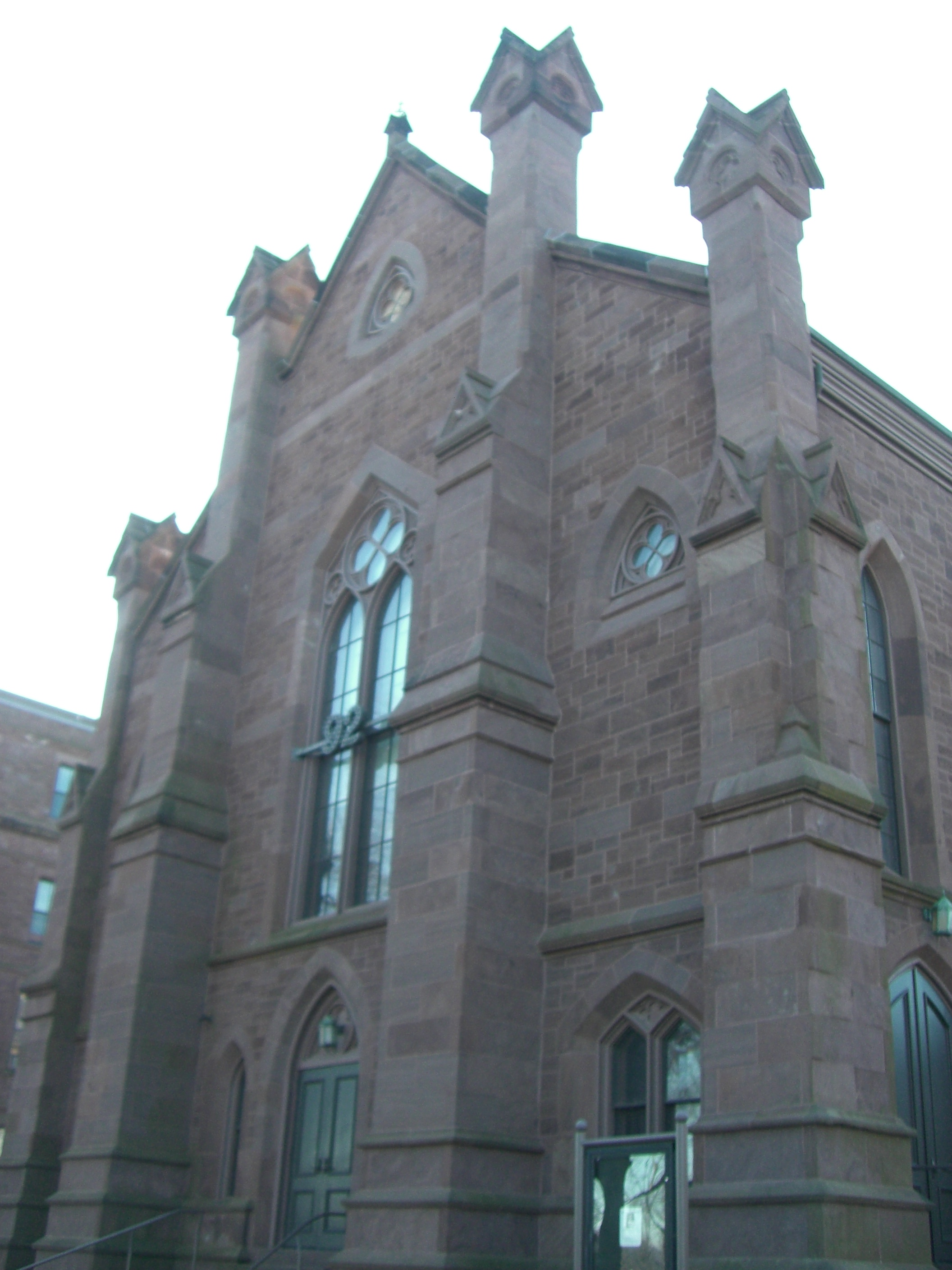
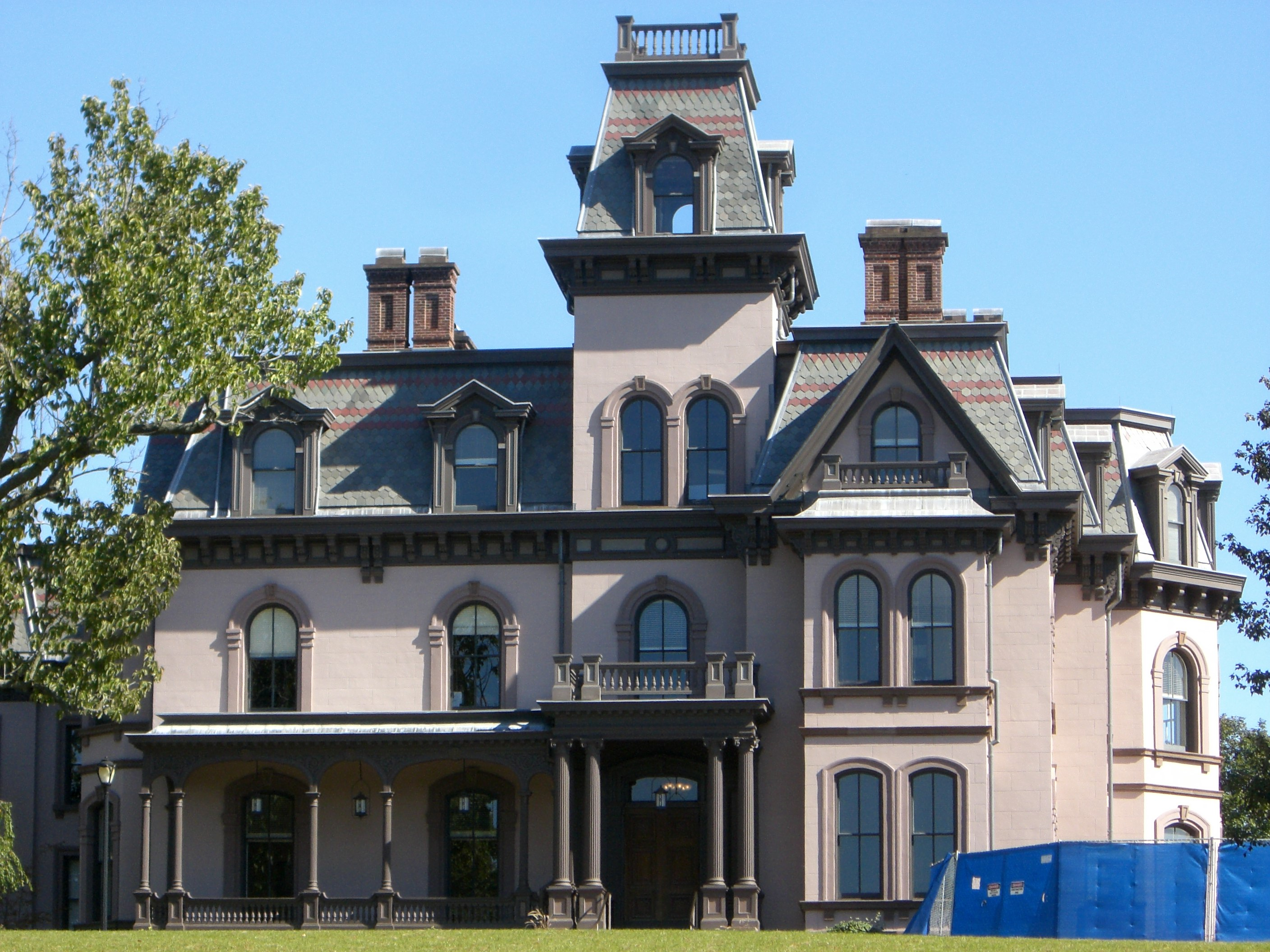
Image	Date	Location	Name and Information
	1840	Wallingford, Connecticut	Samuel Simpson House. (Also known as the Simpson Taber House) Austin designed this Greek revival house early in his career. Although the form is relatively straightforward, some of Austin's styling can be seen in the window surrounds.
	1840*	Trenton, New Jersey	Park Row. Austin in concert with Nelson Hotchkiss designed six, mostly Italianate villas for Hotchkiss' development in Trenton. The two architects seem to have collaborated in the designs, but, since the homes have been demolished, it cannot be determined how they reflected Austin's design proclivities.
	1845	New Haven, Connecticut, Wooster Square	Willis Bristol House. An Italianate villa with striking Moorish/Indian design elements including candelabra columns, Moorish window lambrequins, and uniquely paned windows.
	1845	New Haven, Connecticut, Wooster Square	James E. English House. An Italianate villa; the house has delicate candelabra columns, atypical of other Austin works. The porch displays a delicate, gothic quatrefoil balustrade. The third story is an addition to the original design from 1876.
	1845–1848	New Haven, Connecticut, Hillhouse Avenue	James Dwight Dana House. Now owned by Yale University. The house is an Italianate villa with detailing influenced by Indian precedents, such as the candelabra columns on the porch. The house also has an elaborately carved belvidere on the roof and drops bordering the heavy cornice.
	1842–1845	New Haven, Connecticut	Yale University Library now Dwight Hall. This symmetrical, brownstone, Gothic revival building was built as a library for Yale University. The tall central Gothic hall originally contained balconies with book alcoves, as did the side wings of the building. It was probably based on King's College Chapel in Cambridge, although the many tall pointed spires were not constructed as planned. In 1931, the building was adapted for use as a chapel and the interior altered to accommodate worshipers.
	1848–1849	New Haven, Connecticut	Grove Street Cemetery Gates, 1848–49. Austin designed the gate in Egyptian revival style with papyrus-bud capitals.
	1848–1849*	New Haven, Connecticut	New Haven Railroad Station. This station incorporated Italianate and Moorish revival styles. It was converted into a market in 1874 and was destroyed by fire in 1894.
	1849	New Haven, Connecticut, Hillhouse Avenue	John Pitkin Norton House. Now owned by Yale University, this house is an irregular Italianate villa inspired by A. J. Downing's designs. The window surrounds, canopies, and styling are typical of Austin, as is the flamboyant Moorish entryway. Although much of the detailing, such as the canopies and balconies, had been lost, the house was restored in 2003 by Yale. The third floor and left wing are additions made to Austin's initial design.
	1849*	New Haven, Connecticut	First Methodist Church now First & Summerfield Methodist Church. This church was designed by Austin in a neo-Federal style. Unfortunately, a great deal of Austin's design work, including the spire was removed and replaced in the early 20th century with colonial revival details and a dramatic porch.
	1850*	Wallingford, Connecticut	Moses Yale Beach House This large, symmetrical Italianate villa included a columned veranda with thick candelabra columns, Austin's typical chamfered window surrounds and vegetal decoration on the belvedere. It was demolished in the 1960s.
	1850	New Haven, Connecticut, Wooster Square	Nelson Hotchkiss House This was the first house Austin designed for Nelso Hotchkiss with whom he had worked closely. The windows are surrounded by Austin's signature, notched surrounds. The house also features a delicate canopy over the central three part window. This house is part of a series of villas Austin designed on Chapel Street.
	1850	New Haven, Connecticut, Wooster Square	William Lewis House This was one of the houses in the row on Chapel Street in Wooster Square Austin designed for Hotchkiss; this house was built for a partner of Hotchkiss', William Lewis. The house displays many Austin design elements including the noticeable candelabra columns; it also includes a particularly notable balcony with a unique canopy. Although the house cannot be securely attributed to Austin, its proximity in date and location to his known works and the relationship of the client to Austin argue in favor of the ascription.
	1850	Plainville, Connecticut	Congregational Church. This church was designed by Austin with a mixture of Italianate and carpenter gothic detailing, featuring a tall spire positioned to the side of the nave.
	1850s	New Haven, Connecticut, Hillhouse Avenue	Aaron Skinner House. This house, built in 1832 the Greek revival style by A. J. Davis, was significantly altered by Austin in the 1850s by the addition of second stories to the side wings. Austin's work can also be detected in the characteristic window surrounds and canopies.
	1852*	New Haven, Connecticut	Townsend City Savings Bank. One of Austin's most important commercial commissions, this bank was a three bayed, flamboyant Italianate brownstone structure. The interiors, as evidenced in HABS photographs featured elaborate door surrounds with Austin's typical floral embellishment and frescoes. The bank was demolished in the 1970s.
	1852	New Haven, Connecticut, Wooster Square	Oliver B. King House aka Jonathan King House. This is an impressive, irregular Italianate villa, based on Downing's works, which is part of Austin's Chapel Street project. The house is characterized by its strong central tower around which the masses of the house are arranged as well as canopies and balconies characteristic of Austin. The house has been altered by the addition of a third floor and refenestration in the right wing.
	1854	New Haven, Connecticut, Wooster Square	Hotchkiss-Betts House. Another Italianate villa on Chapel Street, the second house built for Austin's collaborator on several projects, Nelson Hotchkiss. The house features bowed bays and a central door with an elaborate double height porch, utilizing Gothic and Indian design elements with candelabra columns.
	1855	New Haven, Connecticut	Young Men's Institute now the Palladium Building. An attractive four-bay Anglo-Italianate/Renaissance Revial building, the ascription to Austin has never been proven but seems very likely.
	1857	Seymour, Connecticut	Trinity Episcopal Church. This church was built by Austin using the existing frame of the older church in the Italianate style. The original spire and Victorian interior decoration have been replaced by simple colonial revival designs.
	1858	New Haven, Connecticut, East Rock	Lafayette B. Mendel House. This small Italianate design uses classical architectural elements and is a National Historic Landmark.
	1859*	New Haven, Connecticut, Hillhouse Avenue	Joseph Sheffield House Austin supplied Italianate additions to Ithiel Town's mansion, including two large asymmetrical towers, a new porch, and symmetrical side wings with large bay windows. Although the house was one of Austin's most important works, it was demolished in 1957 by Yale to make way for Dunham Laboratory. For Image:
	1858–1860	Portland, Maine	Morse-Libby House (Victoria Mansion). This asymmetric brownstone Italian villa has a four-story tower, ornate carvings, deep overhanging eaves and graceful verandas. Considered to be one of Austin's most significant works, it is constructed of Portland brownstone and displays heavy, opulent classical detailing, which is far less eclectic than many of his earlier designs. The interiors were designed by the Herter Brothers. It is now a museum.
	1860	New Haven, Connecticut	New Haven City Hall This polychromatic Victorian Gothic structure bordering the New Haven Green with clock tower and tall iron staircase was one of Austin's most important works in New Haven. Many decorative motifs and varieties of stone were employed to give the building a colorful, Venetian effect. The design might have been based on a project for a "metropolitan hotel" published in The Illustrated London News in 1859. The remains of this building (much of it was demolished in 1976) are now incorporated into the new City Hall, built in 1986, which abstractly extends the façade. Austin's tower was demolished in the 1950s but reconstructed in the 1980s.
	1866–1868	Middletown, Connecticut	Old Wesleyan University Library / Rich Hall, now Patricelli '92 Theater. This sandstone library follows the earlier library plan Austin developed at Dwight Hall. Although the building has been gutted by the college, Austin's Gothic truss roof remains.
	1868	New Haven, Connecticut	John M. Davies House now Betts House. Designed with David R. Brown, and now owned by Yale University. This 20,000-square-foot (1,900 m^{2}) Victorian (French Second Empire style) mansion is on the National Register of Historic Places. Originally the home of John Davies (an associate of Oliver Winchester), it subsequently housed the Culinary Institute of America. It is now home to the Yale Center for the Study of Globalization. The building was extensively restored by Yale in 2000–2002 after neglect and a fire (in 1990) had caused damage.
	1868*	New Haven, Connecticut	Oliver Winchester House. Austin designed this vaguely second empire house next door to the Davies House for Oliver Winchester. The house employs the same massing, but the detailing is more elaborate, including polychrome mansard roofs, distinctive pediments, and balconies. The house has been demolished.
	1871–1872*	New Haven, Connecticut	Hoadley Building. This three story Second Empire Building once stood at Church and Crown streets and may have been one of Austin's first significant commercial designs in this style. The building has been demolished.
	1877	East Hampton, Connecticut	Second Congregational Church. This church, built in 1855, was dramatically redesigned by Austin in 1877 in the carpenter gothic style with elaborate overhangs, window frames and gothic millwork.
	1879–1880	Branford, Connecticut	W. J. Clark House. This house is in the Stick style, one of the very few works that Austin designed in this style. It has a large tower set to the rear and a double height wrap-around porch. The detailing evokes the Swiss cottage style. For an image:
