= The Country Gentleman =

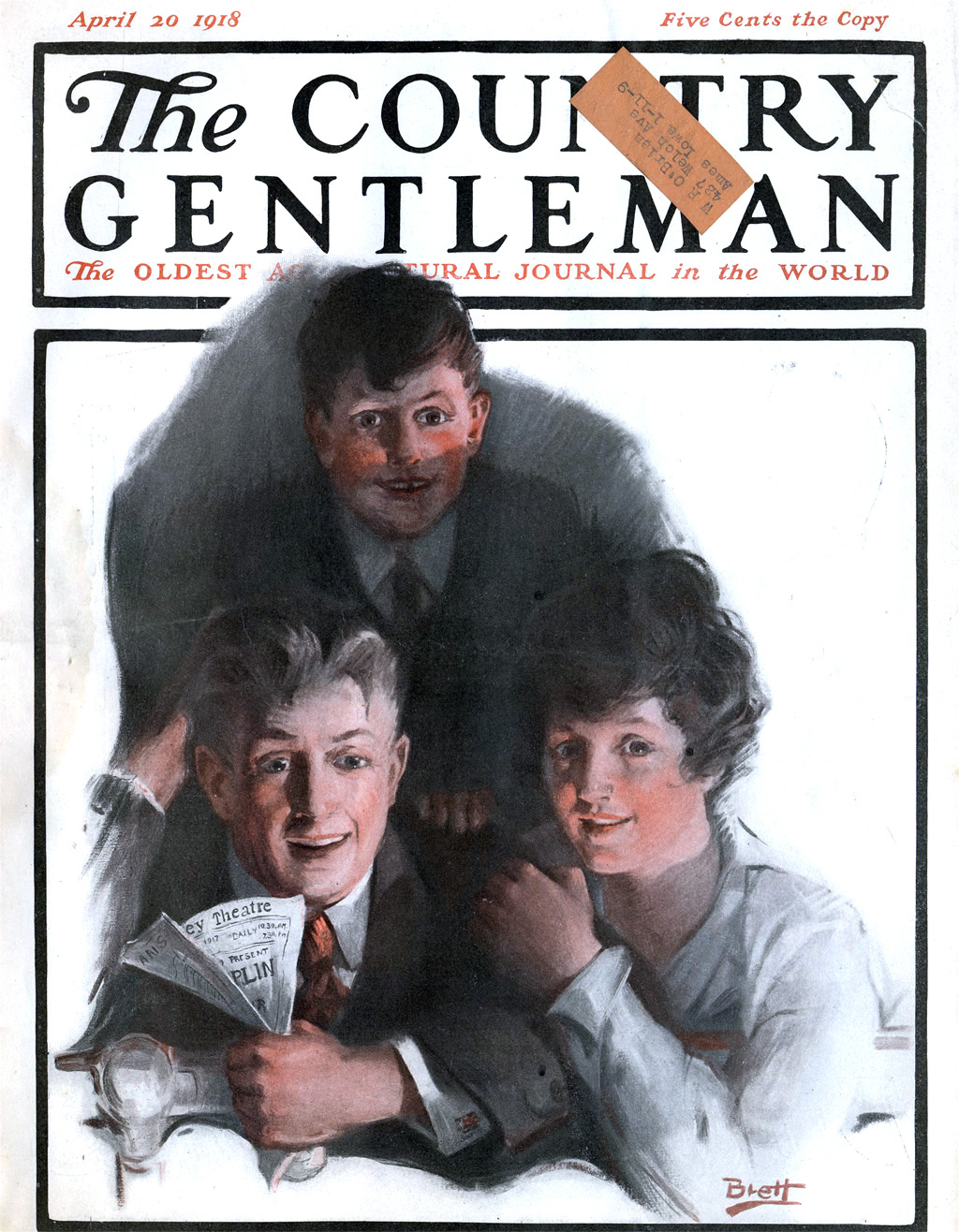
- The Country Gentleman magazine, April 20, 1918
- Founded: 1852
- Final issue: 1955
- Country: United States
- Based in: Albany, New York
- Language: English

The Country Gentleman (1852–1955) was an American agricultural magazine founded in 1852 in Albany, New York, by Luther Tucker.

Since the founder, Luther Tucker, had started Genesee Farmer in 1831, which merged with The Cultivator, which was merged into The Country Gentleman, the claim has been made that it was as old as The Genesee Farmer.

The farm section dealt with agronomy, stock raising, machinery, and meetings of agricultural societies; for gardeners there was advice about methods and information about new varieties of vegetables and fruit…The Fireside Department contained entertaining reading, including excerpts from new books, and a Leisure Hour column of selected poetry.

The magazine was purchased by Philadelphia-based Curtis Publishing Company in 1911. Curtis redirected the magazine to address the business side of farming, which was largely ignored by the agricultural magazines of the time. In 1955, The Country Gentleman was the second most popular agricultural magazine in the US, with a circulation of 2,870,380. That year it was purchased by, and merged into, Farm Journal, an agricultural magazine with a slightly larger circulation.

== Notable people ==
- Maria T. Daviess
