= The Genesee Farmer =

The Genesee Farmer or Genesee Farmer was a very early periodical founded by Luther Tucker in 1831 in Rochester, New York. It was devoted to agriculture and horticulture as well as the domestic and rural economy.

It was one of the earliest farm journals, a genre that began in the early 19th century. There were only 600 subscribers at the end of the first year, by 1839 it had grown to 19,000 subscribers. It was available as a weekly paper or a monthly journal.

Articles in The Genesee Farmer were collected to form an agricultural journal The Monthly Farmer and Horticulturalist, "made up of selections from the Genesee Farmer (a weekly publication)" beginning in January 1836. Then in 1839 Tucker moved to Albany to edit The Cultivator, into which he folded his Genesee Farmer.

To serve the Genesee River community, a New Genesee Farmer and Gardener's Journal was launched in 1840 by John J. Thomas and M.B. Bateman, later edited by Henry Colman and Joseph Harris. It merged with American Agriculturalist in 1866.

Volume "X" (ten) was published in 1849, Volume "XI" (eleven) in 1850, and Volume "XX" (twenty) second series was published in 1859.
