= John Addison Porter Prize =

Annual literary award from Yale University

The John Addison Porter Prize is a literary award given annually by Yale University to the best work of scholarship in any field "where it is possible, through original effort, to gather and relate facts or principles, or both, and to present the results in such a literary form as to make the product of general human interest." This award is among the highest the university confers. The prize was established in 1872 in honor of Professor John Addison Porter, B.A. 1842., and perpetuated with a subsequent gift in 1901.

The award should not be confused with the prize named for his son, the John Addison Porter Prize in American History, which is restricted to undergraduate history majors at Yale.

== Winners ==
Winners of the John Addison Porter Prize over the years have included:

- 1872: Charles Joseph Hardy Ropes
- 1873: Not awarded.
- 1874: Henry Martin Ladd
- 1875: Charles Whittlesey Guernsey
- 1876: Thomas Rutherford Bacon
- 1877: Myron Henry Phelps
- 1878: Henry Ammon James
- 1879: Edward Denmore Robbins
- 1880: Edwin Burpee Goodell
- 1881: Not awarded.
- 1882: Thomas Robert Morrow
- 1883: John Wurts
- 1884: Thorstein B. Veblen
- 1885: Frank Strong
- 1886: Sherman Day Thacher
- 1887: Edward Mortimer Chapman
- 1888: James Hayden Tufts
- 1889: Edward Grant Buckland
- 1890: Gerald H. Beard
- 1891: Ray B. Smith
- 1892: Not awarded.
- 1893: Julian Ingersoll Chamberlain
- 1894: Clive Day
- 1895: William Frederick Foster
- 1896: Winthrop Edwards Dwight
- 1897: Francis Parsons
- 1898: Samuel Peterson
- 1899: Nathan Ayer Smyth
- 1900: Herbert Wescott Fisher
- 1901: Not awarded.
- 1902: Edward Andrew Braniff
- 1903: Richard Webb
- 1904: Not awarded.
- 1905: Stanleigh Arnold
- 1906: Thomas D. Thacher
- 1907: Charles Franklin
- 1908: Alfred Arundel May
- 1909: Not awarded.
- 1910: William Smith Culbertson
- 1911: Jack Randall Crawford
- 1912: Not awarded.
- 1913: William Alexander Robinson
- 1914: Philip Barrows Whitehead
- 1915: Percy Wells Bidwell
- 1916: Richard J. Purcell
- 1917: Thomas Goddard Wright
- 1918: Lawrence H. Gipson
- 1919: Not awarded.
- 1920: Marjorie Hope Nicolson
- 1921: George Stewart
- 1922: Not awarded.
- 1923: Dumas Malone
- 1924: Not awarded.
- 1925: Frederick A. Pottle
- 1926: William Clyde DeVane
- 1927: Not awarded.
- 1928: George Herbert Ryden
- 1929: Stanley Pargellis
- 1930: Not awarded.
- 1931: Harry R. Rudin
- 1932: Roger Franklin Murray
- 1933: George Wilson Pierson
- 1934: Charles Roy Keller
- 1935: Joseph Lee Walsh
- 1936: William B. Willcox
- 1937: Helen Whitcomb Randall
- 1938: Arthur Eugene Bestor
- 1939: Monroe Curtis Beardsley
- 1940: Liston Pope
- 1941: Eric Russell Bentley
- 1942: George Harry Ford
- 1943: John James Brown
- 1944: Lawrence Sidney Willson
- 1945: William Alvord Borst
- 1946: William Frost
- 1947: Richard D. Ellmann
- 1948: William Henry Jordy
- 1949: Pier-Maria Pasinetti
- 1950: William Hugh Kenner
- 1951: Robert H. Ferrell
- 1952: Aubrey Lake Williams
- 1953: Charles Frederick Rudolph, Jr.
- 1954: Otis Arnold Pease
- 1955: George Stephen Carnett
- 1956: Harold Bloom
- 1957: William H. Goetzmann
- 1958: Francis De Tarr
- 1959: Béla Alexander Balassa
- 1960: George Siemers Fayen, Jr.
- 1961: David Gordon
- 1962: Ajodhia Nath Kaul
- 1963: Norma Doris Evenson
- 1964: Allan Ira Ludwig
- 1965: Jonathan D. Spence
- 1966: Michael Jerome Kevin O'Loughlin
- 1967: Edward Murray Peters
- 1968: Robert Laurence Moore
- 1969:
- 1970:
- 1971:
- 1972: Frank M. Turner
- 1973:
- 1974: Joan Shelley Rubin
- 1975:
- 1976: Stephen Holmes
- 1977: John Mack Faragher
- 1978:
- 1979:
- 1980: Philip T. Hoffman
- 1981: Florencia Elizabeth Mallon
- 1982:
- 1983:
- 1984:
- 1985:
- 1986:
- 1987: Candace Waid
- 1988:
- 1989: Jonathan Hay
- 1990:
- 1991:
- 1992:
- 1993: James Shulman
- 1994: Robert Pierce Forbes
- 1995:
- 1996: Benedict Carton
- 1997: Not awarded
- 1998: Karl H. Jacoby & Jennifer Price
- 1999: Blair Gerald Hoxby
- 2000: Michael Rubin & Salim Yaqub
- 2001: Peter Silver, Jeremi Suri, John Fabian Witt
- 2002: Josiah W. Osgood
- 2004: Erez Manela, Jonathan Reed Winkler
- 2005: Aaron Jacob Sachs
- 2006: Adam J. Robinson, John Tuxill, Leslie Ryan
- 2007: Elizabeth Levy Paluck & Stephen C. Vella
- 2008: Elizabeth N. Saunders & Siddhartha Das
- 2009: Henry "Hal" Brands & Wendy Anne Warren
- 2010: Allison Carey (graduate), Philip Gant (undergraduate), Lisa Marrone (undergraduate), Kirsten Weld (graduate)
- 2011: Sarah Cameron, Rui Gao (graduate); Emily Sigman, Joshua Levin (undergraduate)
- 2012: Helen Curry, Catherine McNeur (graduate); Amelia Urry, Matthew Joseph, Eric Morrison, Katherine Orazem (undergraduate)
- 2013: Christine M. Delucia, Andrew Konove (graduate); Tom Stanley-Becker (undergraduate)
- 2014: Brendan Lim, Brian Matthew Jordan (graduate); Jenna Cook, Elizabeth Mattison, Caitlin Radford (undergraduate)
- 2015: ShawnaKim Lowey-Ball, Dana Graef (graduate); Tiraana Bains, Joshua Isackson (undergraduate)
- 2016: Gerardo Con Diaz, Talya Zemach-Bersin (graduate); Simon Brewer, Isaac Stanley-Becker (undergraduate)
- 2017: Andrew Timberlake, Joseph W. Peterson (graduate); Angel Chiamaka Uchegbu, Alison Mosier-Mills, Joshua Altman (undergraduate)
- 2018: Sayd Randall, Gabriel Winant, Alice Baumgartner (graduate); Alexander Zhang, Amelia Nierenberg, Jun Yan Chua (undergraduate)
- 2019: Adele Ricciardi, Alexandra Morrison, Catherine Mas (graduate); Leland Stange, Sheau Yun Lim (undergraduate)
- 2020: Ayten Tartici, Kevin Feeney (graduate) (not awarded to undergraduates this year)
- 2021: Daniele Stefano, Zuri Sullivan (graduate); Grace Chen, Akhil Rajan (undergraduate)
- 2022: Anna Duensing (graduate); Eric Krebs, Montana Love (undergraduate)
- 2023: Rebecca Byler, Zaib Aziz (graduate); Rose Horowitch, Kapp Singer (undergraduate)
- 2024: Aanchal Saraf (graduate); Amelia Davidson (undergraduate)
- 2025: Emily Yankowitz (graduate), Michael Grunst (graduate); Maheen Iqbal (undergraduate)
