= John A. Porter =

John A. Porter may refer to:

- John Addison Porter (1822–1866), American professor of chemistry
- John Addison Porter (Secretary to the President) (1856–1900), first Secretary to the President of the United States
- John Porter (sociologist) (1921–1979), Canadian sociologist
