= Christine Hogan =

Canadian public servant

Deputy Minister of Environment and Climate Change
- In office September 30, 2019 – December 2022

Deputy Minister for International Trade
- In office January 21, 2015 – October 2016

Personal details
- Born: Canada

Christine Hogan is a former Canadian public servant who served as the Deputy Minister of Environment and Climate Change Canada between 2019 and 2022.

== Biography ==
Christine Hogan studied at Carleton University and graduated in 1987 with a bachelor's degree cum laude in public administration. In 2002, she was selected for the Yale World Fellows program at Yale University.

In 1988, Hogan began her career in the Public Service of Canada as a project officer for the Canadian Department of the Environment in the Canadian-US joint program for the preservation of the Great Lakes. In 1995 and 1996, she was Executive Assistant to the Deputy Minister for the Environment.

From 1996 to 1997 she served as an advisor to the executive director of the United Nations Environment Programme (UNEP) in Nairobi. From 1999 to 2003, she was Director of International Policy and Cooperation for Environment and Climate Change Canada. In 2003 and 2004, she served as a senior advisor to the Canadian Privy Council. From 2004 to 2006, she was executive director for Priorities and Planning in the Privy Council Office.

From 2007 to 2010 she served as vice president, Strategic Policy and Performance of the former Canadian International Development Corporation (CIDA). In 2010, she returned to the office of the Privy Council, where she was Assistant Secretary to the cabinet until 2012 - responsible for foreign and defense policy.

From February 2012 to January 2015, she served as Foreign and Defence Policy Advisor to the Prime Minister of Canada.

On March 24, 2014, Russia imposed entry bans on Hogan and 12 other Canadians as a countermeasure to the Canadian sanctions in the context of the Russo-Ukrainian war.

She was appointed Deputy Minister for International Trade by Prime Minister Stephen Harper on January 6, 2015, and began her role on January 21, 2015.

On September 30, 2019, Hogan became the Deputy Minister of Environment and Climate Change. She retired in December 2022.
