= Manasi Subramaniam =

Indian editor

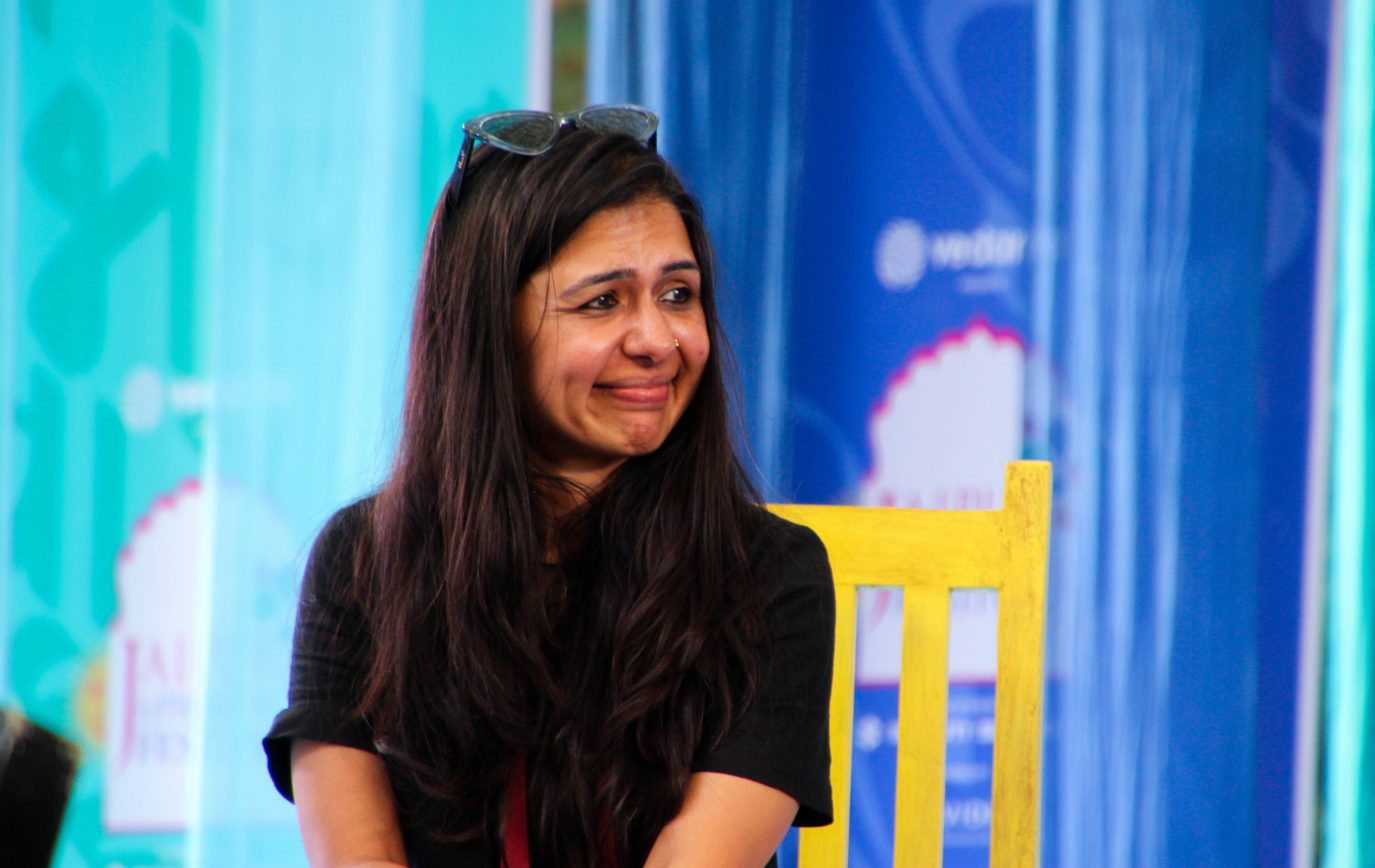
- Education: M.A. Renaissance Literature, B.A. English Literature
- Alma mater: Yale University, Stanford University, University of York, University of Madras
- Occupation: Publisher
- Honours: Yale World Fellowship, WEF Young Global Leader
- Website: https://www.manasisubramaniam.com/

Manasi Subramaniam is an Indian publisher. Until December 2025, she was Editor-in-Chief and Vice-President at Penguin Random House India. She is a Yale World Fellow and a World Economic Forum Young Global Leader.

== Education and Fellowships ==
Subramaniam has a B.A. in English Literature from Stella Maris College, University of Madras, and an M.A. in Renaissance Literature from the University of York. Subramaniam was awarded a Frankfurt Buchmesse fellowship, the Bureau International de l'Édition Française fellowship, the Australia Council for the Arts Visiting International Publishers fellowship, the Zev Birger fellowship and a Pro Helvetia residency. Subramaniam has also been a Maurice R. Greenberg Yale World Fellow at the Jackson School of Global Affairs at Yale University and a Fisher Family Summer Fellow at the Center on Democracy, Development and the Rule of Law at the Freeman Spogli Institute for International Studies at Stanford University. She was named to the World Economic Forum’s Young Global Leaders Class of 2025.

== Publishing career ==
Subramaniam was Editor-in-Chief and Vice-President at Penguin Random House India until December 2025. She oversaw literary publishing across imprints including Allen Lane, Viking, Hamish Hamilton, Penguin and Penguin Classics. She published The Seven Moons of Maali Almeida by Shehan Karunatilaka, which won the 2022 Booker Prize, Tomb of Sand by Geetanjali Shree, translated from the Hindi by Daisy Rockwell, which won the 2022 International Booker Prize, Mother Mary Comes to Me by Arundhati Roy, The Loneliness of Sonia and Sunny by Kiran Desai, which was shortlisted for the 2025 Booker Prize, A Passage North by Anuk Arudpragasam, which was shortlisted for the 2021 Booker Prize, A Burning by Megha Majumdar, which won the 2022 Sahitya Akademi Yuva Puraskar, Djinn Patrol on the Purple Line by Deepa Anappara, which was nominated for the 2020 Women's Prize for Fiction and the 2020 JCB Prize for Literature, 3 Sections by Vijay Seshadri, which won the 2014 Pulitzer Prize for Poetry, among others. Penguin Random House India published Banu Mushtaq's Heart Lamp, translated from Kannada by Deepa Bhasthi, which won the 2025 International Booker Prize during Subramaniam's tenure as Editor-in-Chief. Other authors published by Subramaniam include Salman Rushdie, Neel Mukherjee, Siddhartha Mukherjee, Pico Iyer, Sunjeev Sahota, Tahmima Anam, Manu Pillai, Gurmehar Kaur, Meena Kandasamy and others. She is the English-language publisher for several works of the Tamil writer Perumal Murugan and other Indian writers in translation.

== Other Activities ==
Subramaniam has worked in academic research and amateur theatre. She has written about books for Scroll.in, The Wire, The Hindu Business Line, The Hindu Literary Review, The Asian Review of Books, Mint Lounge and The Sunday Guardian. She has moderated panels with writers including Salman Rushdie, Jenny Erpenbeck, Abdulrazak Gurnah, Gopalkrishna Gandhi, Abraham Verghese, Chigozie Obioma and others. Since 2026, she has worked as an independent consultant and adviser, and sits on the advisory board of the South Asian Literature in Translation project at the University of Chicago. She was on the 2027 jury for the Deutscher Akademischer Austauschdienst (DAAD) Artists-in-Berlin excellence award grant (Literature).
