= Chantal-Line Carpentier =

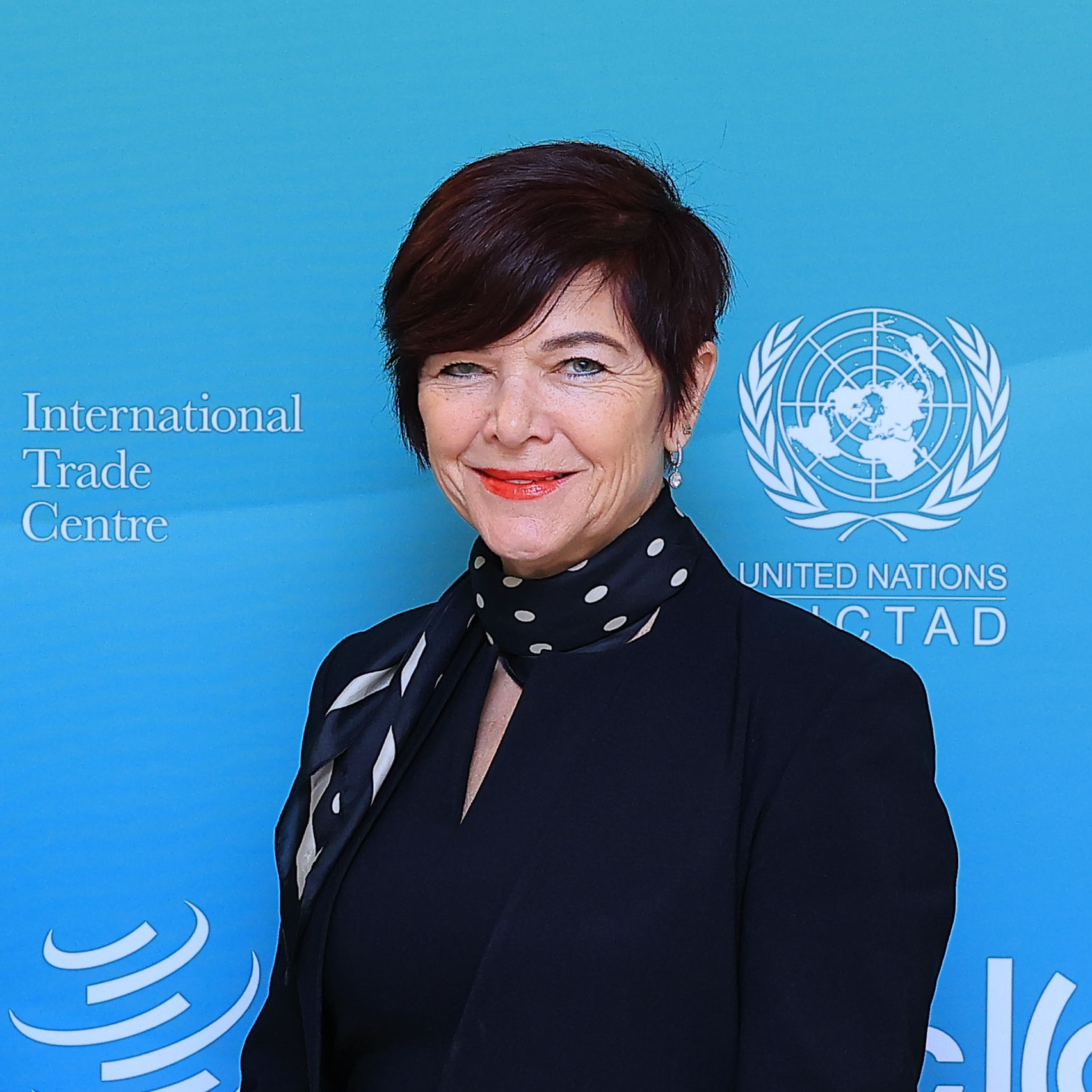
- Born: Canada
- Education: McGill University, Virginia Tech

Chantal-Line Carpentier is a Canada-born Head of Trade, Environment, Climate and Sustainable Development, of UN Trade and Development’s (UNCTAD) Division on International Trade and Commodities following 7 years as Chief of UNCTAD in New York. She is a strong supporter of the United Nations Sustainable Development Goals and in particular SDG12 concerned with responsible and sustainable production, climate, the ocean economy, and biodiversity with a trade and development perspective.

== Life ==
Carpentier was born in Canada. She took her first and master's degrees at McGill University in the economics of agriculture, and a PhD degree in Agricultural and Applied Economics at Virginia Tech University. In 1996, she began working as a post doctoral fellow of the International Food Policy Research Institute in Brazil. She completed that work in 1998.

She is fluent in the Canadian languages of English and French and she also speaks Portuguese and Spanish and she has a good knowledge of Mandarin. She is keen on karate and she has competed in ironman events and ultra marathons.

In 2006 she became a Yale World Fellow. In October 2008, the United Nations Environment Programme unveiled a Global Green New Deal to create jobs in "green" industries. Carpentier co-authored a UN document to encourage its wider membership.

From 2007 to 2010 she was involved with created the programme to support the UN's ambitions, as one of United Nations Department of Economic and Social Affairs (DESA)'s sustainable development officers, for what became SDG12. Responsible production included food security and sustainable agriculture. In 2014, she was still working for DESA when she became the Chief of UNCTAD based in New York.

She has presented a TEDx talk titled The Fleeting Chance of a Sustainable World at TEDxSainteAnnedeBellevue and she has spoken at Syracuse University about Chantal Line Carpentier to present ‘Negotiating a Global Sustainable Development Agenda in 2015.

Carpentier came up with the idea of a colour economy which she developed as a way of developing new interest in looking at alternative ways of organising an economy. The concept of a green low carbon economy was well known but she developed new colours. Blue was sustainable use of the seas and yellow was for the attention economy including the on-line companies who want to capture and sell the usrs attention. She wrote a paper on it and then gained the support of the UN's chief economist.

== Publications include ==
- Agriculture and the Environment: An Economic-ecologic Input-output Model of the Canadian Economy, 1994
- Understanding and Anticipating Environmental Change in North America: Building Blocks for Better Public Policy, 2001
- Agricultural Intensification by Smallholders in the Western Brazilian Amazon: From Deforestation to Sustainable Land Use, 2002 (with others)
- Ethical Investing (in French), 2008.
- Trade Policy for Resilient, Inclusive, and Sustainable Development in a New International Economic Order, 2022 (with others)
