= Emma Sky =

British expert on conflict, reconciliation and stability

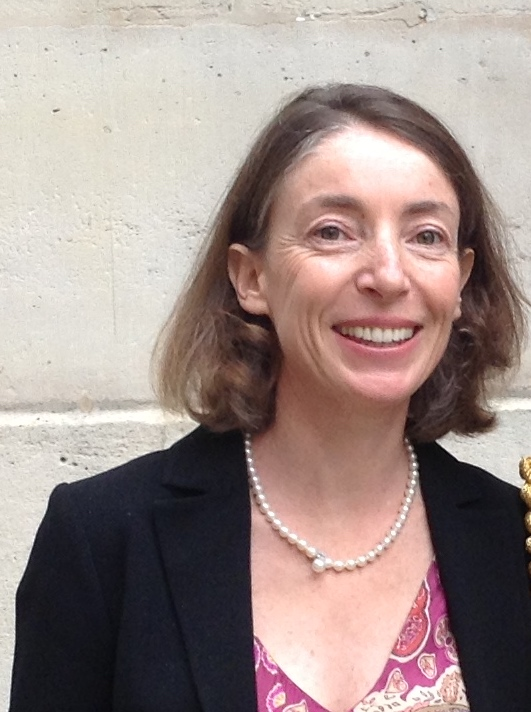
- Emma Sky
- Born: 1968 (age 56–57); England
- Occupation(s): Director of Yale World Fellows; Jackson Institute for Global Affairs Senior Fellow
- Notable work: The Unraveling: High Hopes and Missed Opportunities in Iraq (2015)

Emma Sky, OBE is a British expert on conflict, reconciliation and stability, who has worked mainly in the Middle East. She served in Iraq as the political advisor to US General Ray Odierno and General David Petraeus during the surge. She is founding director of the International Leadership Center at Yale University, overseeing the Yale World Fellows Program and other initiatives. She is a Senior Fellow at Yale's Jackson School for Global Affairs, where she lectures on Middle East politics and global affairs.

She is the author of The Unravelling: High Hopes and Missed Opportunities in Iraq (2015) and In a Time of Monsters: Travelling in a Middle East in Revolt (2019).

== Early life and education ==
Sky was born and grew up in England. She attended the Ashfold School and Dean Close School and earned her undergraduate degree in Oriental studies at Somerville College, Oxford University. She also studied at Alexandria University in Egypt, the Hebrew University of Jerusalem in Israel, and the University of Liverpool.

== Career ==
Following Oxford, Sky spent about ten years working for non-governmental organisations in attempts at ‘development and conflict resolution’.

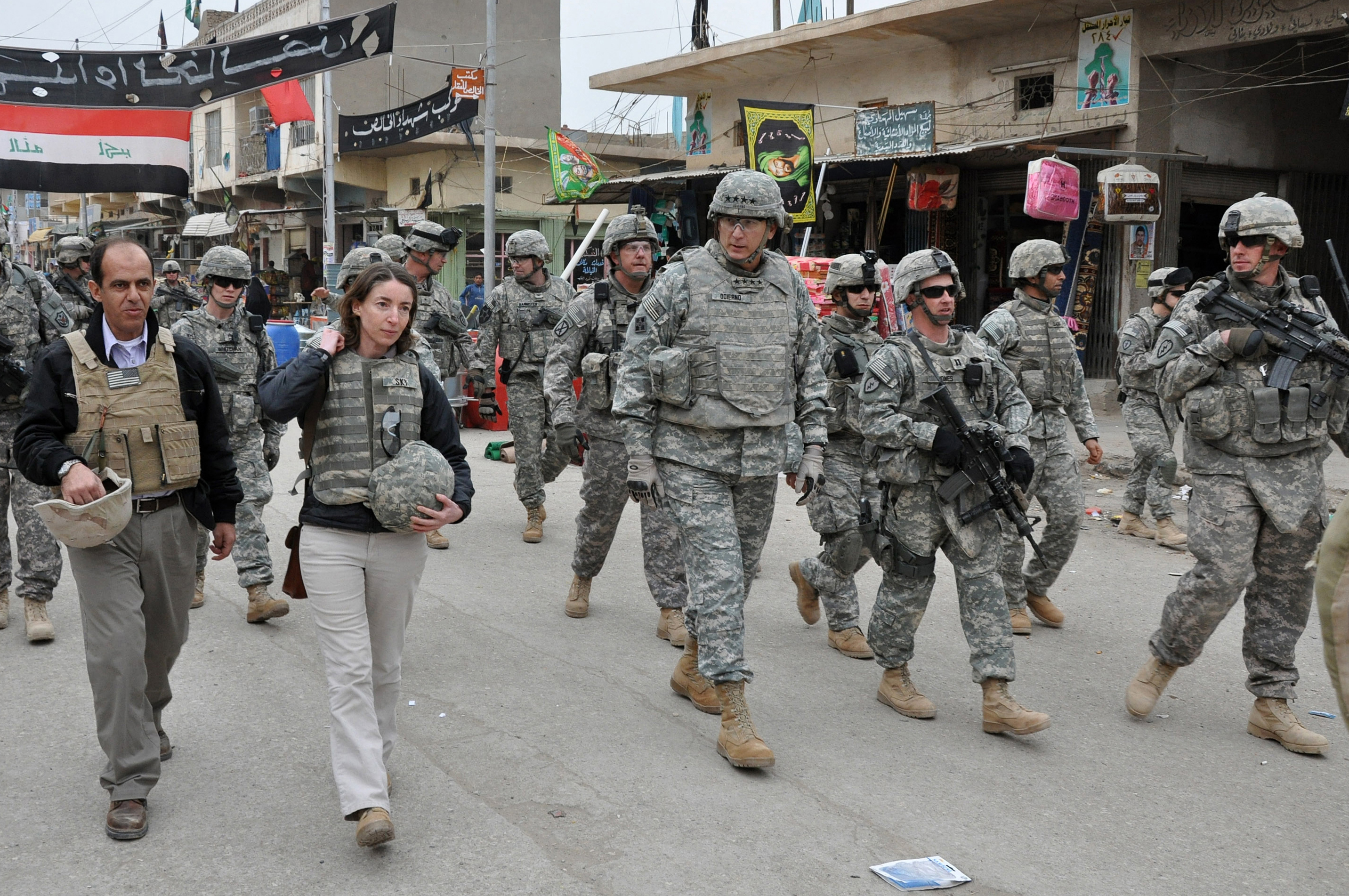
Emma Sky (second from left) accompanying Gen. Ray Odierno (centre) on a visit to a local market in Khalis, Iraq, January 2009.

During this period, Sky primarily lived in Israel, working in the East Jerusalem office of the British Council managing projects in the West Bank and Gaza which aimed to help build up the capacity of Palestinian institutions, and to promote co-existence between Israelis and Palestinians. In 2001, Sky returned to the UK and continued working for the British Council in Manchester, where she remained until the launch of the 2003 Iraq War.

Although opposed to the 2003 invasion of Iraq, Sky volunteered to join the Coalition Provisional Authority and served as the Governorate Coordinator of Kirkuk from 2003 to 2004.

Sky served in 2005 in Jerusalem as the Political Advisor to General Kip Ward, the US Security Co-ordinator for the Middle East Peace Process. In 2006, she was based in Kabul, Afghanistan as the Development Advisor to the Italian and British Commanding Generals of NATO's International Security Assistance Force.

From 2007 to 2010, Sky served as the Political Advisor to US General Raymond T. Odierno when he was the Commanding General of Multi-National Corps – Iraq and Commanding General of US Forces Iraq. She also advised General David Petraeus on reconciliation.

Sky testified before the Iraq Inquiry in January 2011.

Sky was a Spring 2011 Fellow at Harvard University's Kennedy School of Government. From 2011–2012, she was a visiting professor at King's College London and a Fellow at Oxford's Changing Character of War Programme.

Since August 2012, Sky has been a Senior Fellow at the Yale Jackson School of Global Affairs, where she lectures on Middle East politics and great power competition. Since 2015, Sky has been Director of the Yale World Fellows international leadership development program. Sky oversaw the transition of the program to the Jackson Institute for Global Affairs, and in 2016 secured a $16 million contribution from the Starr Foundation and Maurice R. Greenberg. She also served as the Director of Yale's Leadership Forum for Senior African Women.

Sky is a former member of the Wilton Park Advisory Council. She is a trustee of the HALO Trust.

== Books ==
Sky is the author The Unravelling: High Hopes and Missed Opportunities in Iraq (2015), which was one of the New York Times 100 notable books of 2015, and shortlisted for the 2015 Samuel Johnson Prize for Nonfiction, the 2016 Orwell Prize, and the 2016 Council on Foreign Relations Arthur Ross Book Award. She also wrote In a Time of Monsters: Travelling in a Middle East in Revolt (2019).

== Awards ==
Sky was made a Member of the Order of the British Empire in 2003 and an Officer of the Order of the British Empire in 2008 in recognition of her service in Iraq.
