= Russell Henry Chittenden =

American physiological chemist

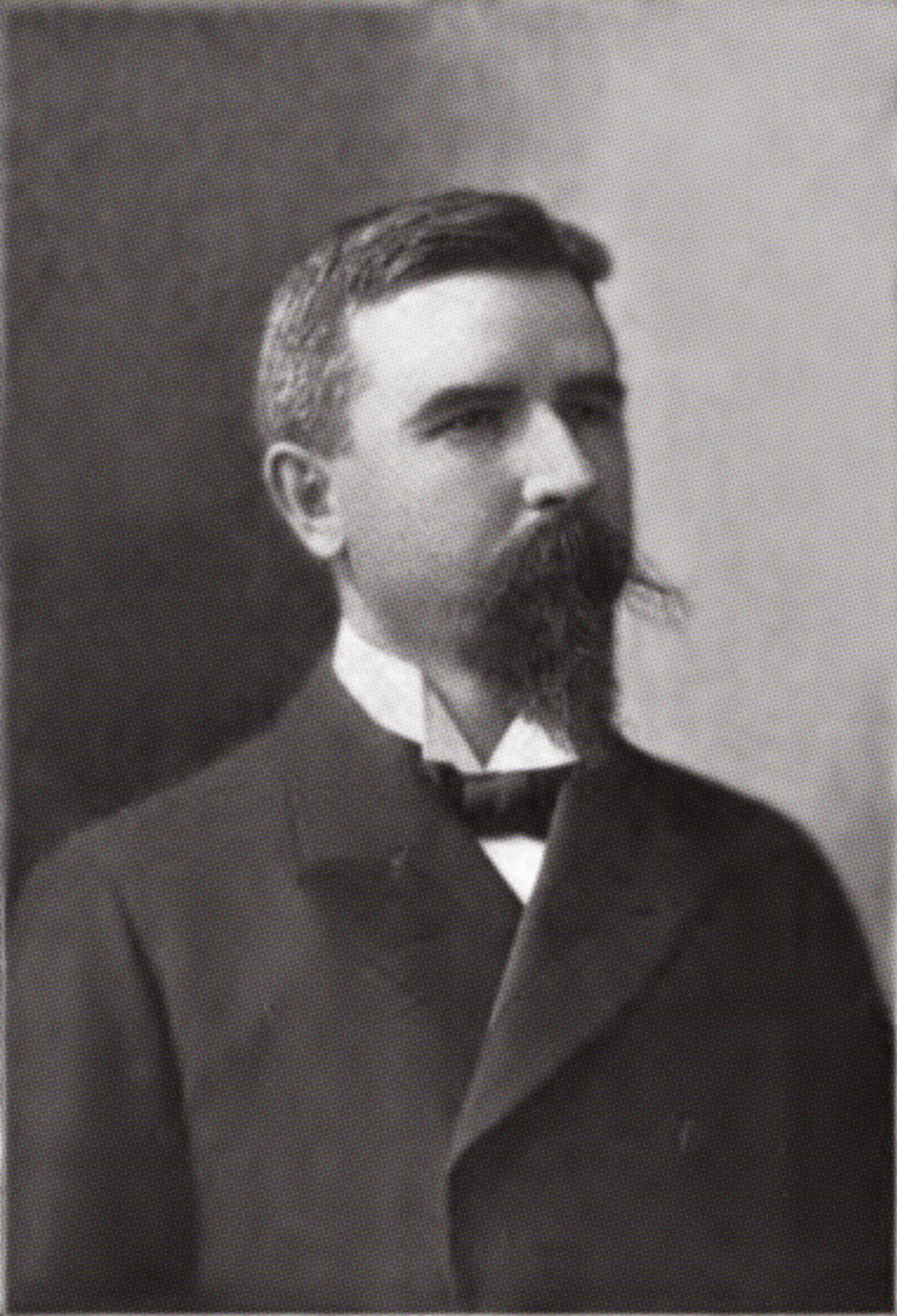
- Born: February 18, 1856; New Haven, Connecticut, US
- Died: December 26, 1943 (aged 87); New Haven, Connecticut, US
- Scientific career
- Fields: Chemistry
- Workplaces: Yale University; Columbia University; United States National Research Council
- Doctoral advisor: Wilhelm Kühne
- Doctoral students: Lafayette Mendel

Russell Henry Chittenden (18 February 1856 – 26 December 1943) was an American physiological chemist. He conducted pioneering research in the biochemistry of digestion and nutrition.

== Early life and education ==
He was born in New Haven, Connecticut, in 1856, graduated from the Sheffield Scientific School at Yale University in 1875, studied in Heidelberg in 1878–79, and received his doctorate at Yale in physiological chemistry in 1880. He was of English ancestry, his first ancestor in America being Major William Chittenden, an officer in the English army, who, having resigned, came to America from Cranbrook, Kent, with his wife, Joanne Sheaffe, in 1639, and settled in Guilford Connecticut. Ancestors of the professor on both his father's and his mother's side fought in the Revolutionary War.

== Career ==
He was professor of physiological chemistry at Yale from 1882 to 1922. He was director of the Sheffield Scientific School from 1898-1922. He was also professor of physiology at the Yale School of Medicine starting in 1900. From 1898 to 1903 he was also a lecturer on physiological chemistry at Columbia University, New York. He was a founding member of the American Physiological Society in 1887 and served as its president from 1895 to 1904. He was a member of the Connecticut Academy of Arts and Sciences. In 1904, he was elected as a member of the American Philosophical Society.

He was the author of Digestive Proteolysis and Physiological Economy in Nutrition (New York, 1905). During World War I, Professor Chittenden was a member of the Advisory Committee on Food Utilization and also a member of the executive committee of the National Research Council. He is often called the "father of American biochemistry". His home in New Haven is a National Historic Landmark.

Chittenden advocated a low-protein diet. He wrote, "If through years and generations of habit we have become addicted to the use of undue quantities of proteid foods, quantities way beyond the physiological requirements of the body, then we have to consider the possibility that this excess of daily food may be more or less responsible for many diseased conditions, which might be obviated by more careful observance of the true physiological needs of the body."

== Russell Henry Chittenden Prize ==
An annual tradition during Yale College Class Day, the Russell Henry Chittenden Prize is "awarded to the graduating senior in the natural sciences or in mathematics who ranks highest in scholarship". This award was originally given to the highest ranking graduate earning a degree in the Bachelor of the Sciences. Thornton Leigh Page, Andrew M. Gleason, Murray Gerstenhaber, Howard Zimmerman, Guido Calabresi, Jonathan Wahl, Edward Hundert, and Nicholas Christakis have received this award.

== Publications ==
- Physiological Economy in Nutrition (1904)
- The Nutrition of Man (1907)

== Sources ==
- Chittenden at Yale Medical School
- G.R. C., 1944. Russell Henry Chittenden, February 18, 1856 - December 26, 1943. An appreciation. The Journal of Nutrition, 28 (1), 2-6. Article
- Lewis, H.B., 1944. Russell Henry Chittenden, (1856 - 1943). The Journal of Biological Chemistry, 153 (2), 339-342. Article
- Vickery, H.B., 1944. Russell Henry Chittenden, 1856 - 1943. National Academy of Sciences, Biographical Memoirs, 24, 59-104. Article
