= Peter Silver =

American historian

- Born: New Haven, Connecticut, U.S.
- Education: Harvard College; Yale University (MA, PhD)
- Occupation: Historian
- Children: 1
- Awards: John Addison Porter Prize (2001); Bancroft Prize (2008); Mark Lynton History Prize (2008)

Peter Silver (born New Haven, Connecticut) is an early American historian.

== Life ==
He was raised in Richmond, Indiana. He graduated from Harvard College, magna cum laude, and from Yale University, with an MA and Ph.D. in 2001. He taught at Princeton University, where he held the Richard Allen Lester University Preceptorship. He teaches at Rutgers University.

He lives with his wife and daughter, spending holidays near Southwest Harbor, Maine.

== Awards ==
- 1998-1999 Whiting Fellowship
- 2001 John Addison Porter Prize
- 2008 Bancroft Prize, Our Savage Neighbors
- 2008 Mark Lynton History Prize, Our Savage Neighbors

== Works ==
- Our Savage Neighbors: How Indian War Transformed Early America. New York: W. W. Norton & Co. 2007. ISBN 978-0-393-06248-9.
- A Rotten Colossus: Spanish and British America in the War of Jenkins's Ear.
