= Rui Chenggang =

Chinese journalist

- Born: September 24, 1977 (age 48); Hefei, Anhui, China
- Education: China Foreign Affairs University
- Occupations: Anchor; Journalist
- Years active: 2000–2014; 2024–

Rui Chenggang (Chinese: 芮成钢; pinyin: Ruì Chénggāng; born September 24, 1977) is a Chinese media personality. He rose to prominence in the late 2000s as a news anchor and journalist for China Central Television, where he became the state broadcaster's go-to interviewer for business and political leaders, noted for his fluent English and sometimes controversial, nationalistic style.

Rui was detained in July 2014 on suspicion of bribery, with a sentence from 2015 to 2020. After his release, he has worked as an investor. In October 2024 he launched his YouTube channel.

== Career ==
Rui was born in Hefei, Anhui in 1977. He went to No. 8 Middle School in Hefei, and was the president of the student council. In 1995 during gaokao exams, Rui ranked first among social science and humanities students in his city, and ranked fourth in his province. He was admitted to the International Economics program in the English Department at China Foreign Affairs University in 1995. He represented China at the 1998 International Public Speaking Competition.

In 2000, Rui joined China Central Television and became one of the first reporters and news anchors at the state broadcaster's newly launched English language channel CCTV-9, the first and only 24hr, news-oriented international TV channel of China. Rui's prime-time daily business newscast BizChina quickly grew into the flagship program that delivers Chinese business and markets news, data and analysis to the English speaking audience worldwide. Beginning from 2001, Rui and his news program regularly covered the annual World Economic Forum in Davos, Switzerland, and its annual summer meetings in China. Rui was named one of the "Global Leaders of Tomorrow" by the World Economic Forum in 2001.

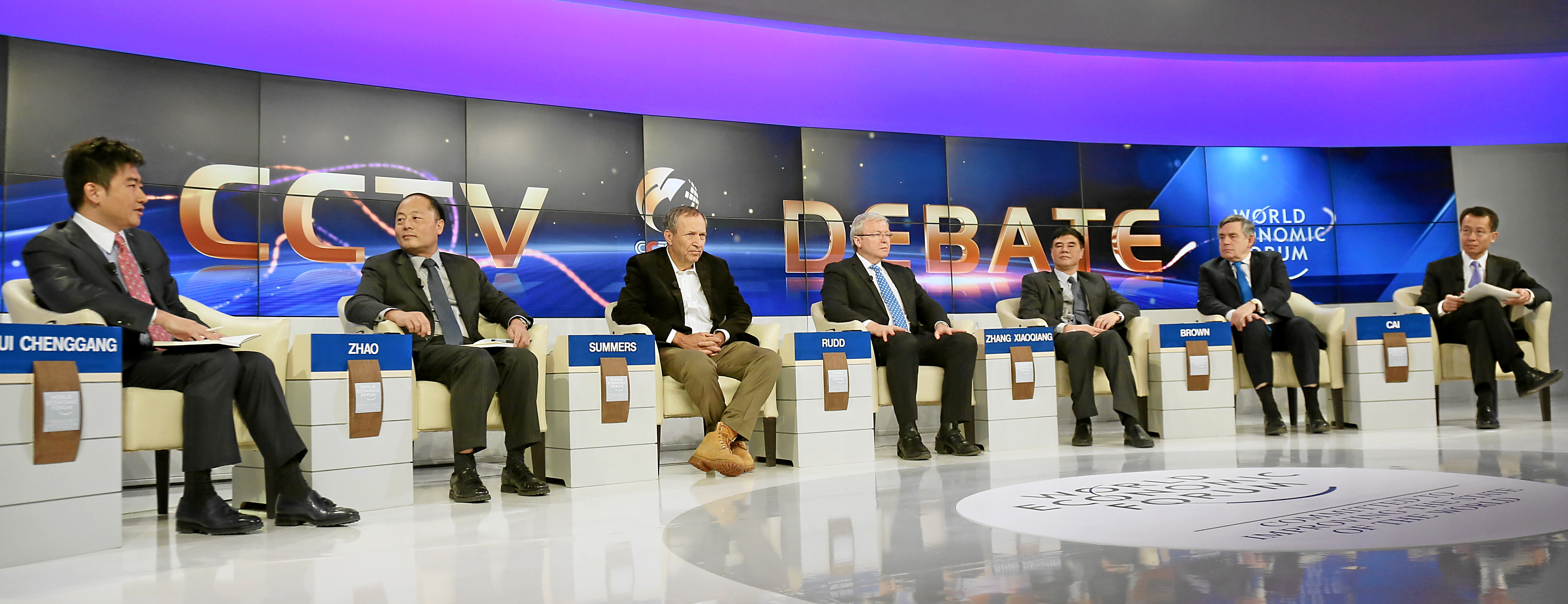
Rui Hosting a Panel of Business and Political Leaders at the World Economic Forum 2013

In 2005, Rui was selected to the Yale World Fellow Program. He took a temporary leave from his job and studied in residence at Yale University.

In 2008, Rui left CCTV-9 for CCTV-2, a Chinese-language channel focusing on business and economics. At CCTV-2 he gained popularity as the host for programs such as Economics Half Hour (经济半小时), Economic News (经济信息联播), and Global Economic Connection (环球经济连线). He also became known for his interviews with global leaders such as Bill Gates, Tony Blair, Yasuo Fukuda, and Bill Clinton, though sometimes in a controversial or nationalistic style. His nightly financial news program attracted 13 million viewers. By 2014, Rui had gathered millions of followers on various social media sites and was considered a 'star anchor' for CCTV. His fluent English speaking abilities made him a symbol of the "globalization of the economics channel of CCTV".

Rui also wrote two best-selling books in China: Life Begins At Thirty (30而励) in 2009 and Something For Nothing (虚实之间) in 2012.

=== Awards and Accolades ===
Rui Chenggang was knighted with the Order of Stella d'Italia (Star of Italy) by President Giorgio Napolitano of Italy in 2013, the second year this Italian order of chivalry was founded, for his contributions in promoting friendship and cooperation between Italy and China. He received the honor at the Embassy of Italy in Beijing in June 2013 at a ceremony hosted by Italy's Ambassador to China at the time, Alberto Bradanini.

Rui Chenggang won the 2010 China Broadcasting and Hosting "Golden Microphone Award", the highest honor of the state for TV journalists in China.

=== Arrest and disappearance ===
On July 11, 2014, during the live broadcast of CCTV's Economic News, Rui's seat was conspicuously empty, though his microphone remained on the desk, sparking public speculation. The following day, media reports revealed that Rui had been taken into custody. Apart from sporadic media reports speculating on his whereabouts, it is not clear what happened to Rui after 2014, until he was sentenced to six years in prison in 2016 by the court of Jilin Province for alleged bribery. Rui's sentence ran from May 18, 2015, to December 11, 2020.

=== Comeback ===
On October 21, 2024, after disappearing from the public eye for ten years, Rui reemerged on YouTube, which is banned in China, with a video titled "Rui Chenggang is back." In the video, he acknowledged being confined for six and a half years, but refuted rumors about his involvement in an espionage case or sex scandals. Rui also revealed that he now works as an investor.

== Controversies ==
In 2007, he criticized in his blog the presence of a Starbucks shop at the Forbidden City, suggesting that the Starbucks intruded a site of Chinese historical heritage and argued against the "commercialization" of historical sites and an encroachment on Chinese culture. Starbucks removed the store from the Forbidden City half a year later.

At the 2010 G20 Seoul summit, Rui attracted controversy when U.S. President Barack Obama said he would give the final question at a press conference to South Korean media. When no one in the South Korea media crew responded, Rui raised his hand and was called on by President Obama. Rui then opened his question with "I'm actually Chinese, but I think I get to represent the entire Asia".

On September 14, 2011, during the Summer Davos Forum in Dalian, Rui questioned Gary Locke, the U.S. Ambassador to China at the time, about his decision to fly economy class to China, asking whether it was intended to remind the world that the U.S. owed money to China. Locke responded that as a U.S. government official, it was standard practice for him—along with consular officials, embassy staff, and even members of the President's Cabinet—to travel in economy class for official trips. Following the exchange, Rui commented on Weibo, stating: "He seizes every opportunity to relentlessly promote American values, highlighting the good while rarely mentioning the bad. That is his job. Among all U.S. ambassadors to China, he is perhaps the most eager and skilled at self-promotion. Whether it's carrying a backpack, drinking coffee, taking a shuttle bus, or flying economy class, he ensures that these moments are precisely captured, shared, and discussed. As a former governor, he certainly understands how the media works."

== See also ==
- Ye Yingchun
