= Ye Yingchun =

Chinese news anchor and journalist (born 1970)

- Born: January 23, 1970 (age 56); Jingdezhen, Jiangxi, China
- Education: Communication University of China
- Occupations: Broadcast journalist Anchor
- Years active: 1991–2013
- Known for: TV Anchor on CCTV-4; Placed under investigation in 2013

Ye Yingchun (Chinese: 叶迎春; pinyin: Yè Yíngchūn; born January 23, 1970) is a Chinese news anchor and journalist for China's state-run broadcaster China Central Television. She is known for hosting various programs on CCTV-4, the official Chinese-language channel targeting overseas viewers. In August 2014, Hong Kong–based Phoenix Television reported that Ye had been detained for investigation in connection with the Zhou Yongkang case.

== Career ==
Ye Yingchun was born in Jingdezhen, Jiangxi province in 1970. She attended the Beijing Broadcasting Institute (now Communications University of China). In 1991, she became a TV host on the local television station in Jingdezhen. In 1993 she became an anchor on the Jiangxi provincial version of Xinwen Lianbo. In 1994 she was admitted to graduate school at the Department of Journalism of the Beijing Broadcasting Institute. She then joined CCTV, initially as the anchor of the program Military Report (軍事報導). She also took part in the CCTV broadcasts for the return of Hong Kong and Macau to Chinese sovereignty, Y2K, September 11, the completion of the Three Gorges Dam, the war in Iraq, the 16th Party Congress, the fight against SARS, and the 2008 Sichuan earthquake.

Ye has won numerous awards, including the Golden Microphone , for her television work because of her colloquial and accessible presentation style and tone. She also was a member of China Youth Federation, China Social Work Association, and was a Vice Chairman of Jiangxi Youth Federation.

Ye's last social media feed was recorded in September 2013. Chinese-language media reported that Ye rendezvoused with former Chinese domestic security chief Zhou Yongkang in Beijing in November 2013, only two days before the latter was detained for a corruption investigation.

== See also ==
- Rui Chenggang
