= Yale World Fellows =

International fellowship program at Yale University

- Formation: 2002
- Type: Non-profit organization
- Headquarters: Horchow Hall
- Location: New Haven, Connecticut
- Region served: Worldwide
- Director: Emma Sky
- Parent organization: Yale University
- Website: worldfellows.yale.edu

Yale World Fellows is an international fellowship program at Yale University for rising global leaders.

World Fellows come from around the world and from diverse disciplines. They are selected through a competitive application process. Each year, the program selects 16 World Fellows to reside at Yale for the fall semester to study, share their knowledge, and expand their networks.

The World Fellows program is located in Horchow Hall, within the Jackson Institute for Global Affairs, on Hillhouse Avenue.

== History ==
In November 2000, University President Rick Levin announced several internationalization initiatives, including the World Fellows program, in conjunction with the university's tercentenary. Journalist and White House aide Brooke Shearer was appointed its founding director, and Dan Esty its first program director. The program moved into Betts House, restored in 2001 to house new international initiatives. The first class of fellows was admitted in 2002.

Since 2015, Emma Sky has been Director of the Yale World Fellows. Sky oversaw the transition of the program to the Jackson Institute for Global Affairs, and in 2016 secured a $16 million contribution from the Starr Foundation and Maurice R. Greenberg.

As of November 2024, the program has a network of over 400 World Fellows in 96 countries.

== Program ==
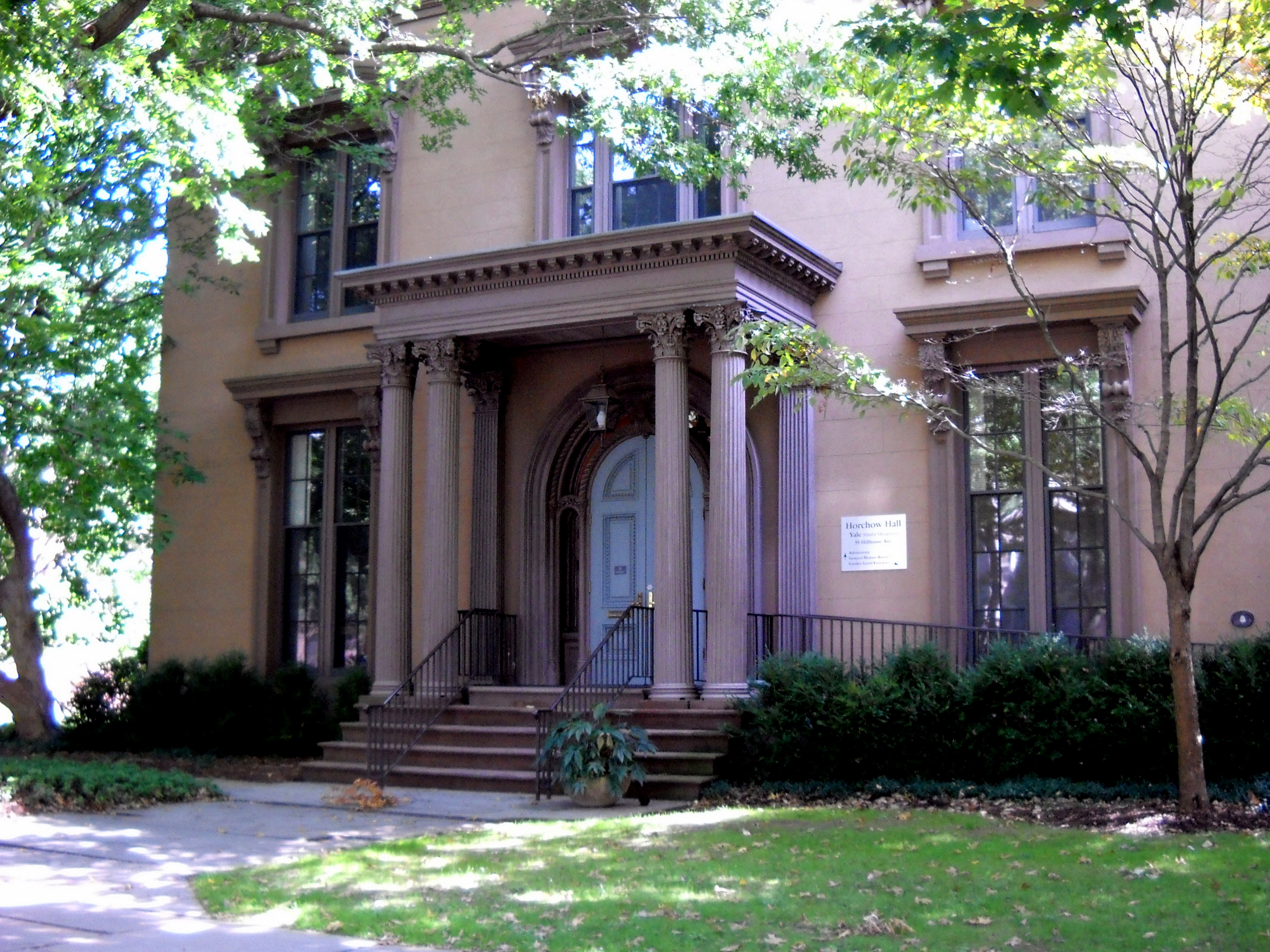
The program is located in Horchow Hall, within Yale's Jackson Institute for Global Affairs.

World Fellows "receive individual and group coaching and skills development training." They can audit courses at the university. They give talks and participate on panels across the campus.

A key component of the program is the weekly "Good society" seminar where World Fellows present what they do professionally and how they contribute to building a better society. World Fellows also host a weekly salon to which they invite Yale faculty and other guests for off-the-record conversations.

Participants receive a compensation package which includes

- A taxable stipend to cover the costs of living in New Haven
- A modest, furnished one, or two-bedroom apartment for the duration of the program
- Medical insurance
- Round-trip travel from home country

== Selection ==
Admission to the program is highly competitive. The program runs from mid-August to mid-December. Fellows are required to be in residence at Yale during the duration of the program.

Candidates for the program must be:

- fluent in English;
- in their early mid-career, roughly 5–20 years into their professional careers, with demonstrated professional accomplishments

== Notable fellows ==
Notable World Fellows include:

- Jake Sullivan, national security advisor to U.S. President Joe Biden
- Alexei Navalny, a Moscow-based lawyer and political opposition leader, named one of Time magazine's 2012 100 Most Influential People
- Tim Jarvis, Australian environmental scientist
- María Corina Machado, Venezuelan Congresswoman and opposition leader, 2025 Nobel Prize Winner and one of BBC's World's 100 Most Influential Women in 2018
- Gidon Bromberg, Israeli environmental activist, named one of Time's "Environmental Heroes of the Year" in 2008
- Aboubakr Jamaï, Moroccan journalist, co-founder of Le Journal Hebdomadaire
- Ma Jun, environmental activist, winner of the 2012 Goldman Environmental Prize
- Norbert Mao, 2011 presidential candidate for the Democratic Party of Uganda
- Mohamed Elfayoumy, Egyptian diplomat and consul of Egypt in Damascus from 2010 to 2012
- Rui Chenggang, Chinese news anchor
- Martín Lousteau, National Deputy and ex-Minister of Economy of Argentina. Actual ambassador of Argentina in United States.
- Belabbes Benkredda, Algerian-German social innovator, 2013 NDI Democracy Award recipient
- Marvin Rees, Mayor of Bristol, United Kingdom
- Muna AbuSulayman, Saudi businesswoman and activist
- Ahmad Al-Basheer, Iraqi comedian, journalist and director
- Sultan Sooud Al-Qassemi, Emirati commentator on Arab affairs and a prominent voice during the Arab Spring
- Tania Bruguera, Cuban installation and performance artist
- Nandita Das, Indian actor and director
- Manasi Subramaniam, Indian editor
- Katrin Eggenberger, Foreign Minister of Lichtenstein
- Paula Escobar, Chilean magazine editor, columnist, and journalist
- Julio Guzmán, Peruvian economist, politician, and leader of the Purple Party
- Sergey Lagodinsky, German lawyer and politician of the Alliance 90/The Greens
- Claudia López Hernández, Colombian politician
- Renzo Martens, Dutch artist
- Omar Mohammed, citizen journalist who created and maintained the news blog Mosul Eye during the occupation of Mosul by the Islamic State of Iraq and the Levant (ISIL)
- Babatunde Omilola, Nigerian diplomat, development economist, banker and United Nations official
- Roz Savage, English ocean rower, environmental activist
- Andriy Shevchenko, Ukrainian journalist and politician
- Jian Yi, Chinese filmmaker, digital media expert and food systems innovator
- Annemie Turtelboom, Belgian politician
- Svyatoslav Vakarchuk, Ukrainian politician, musician and public activist
- Carlos Vecchio, Venezuelan lawyer, politician and social activist
- Temur Iakobashvili, Georgian political scientist, diplomat, and politician
