= James Shulman =

American businessman (born 1965)

James Shulman is the president of the Rockefeller Archive Center.

From 2018 until 2025, Shulman served as vice president and chief operating officer at the American Council of Learned Societies (ACLS). He has worked in higher education and philanthropy since receiving his PhD in 1993. Until May 2016, he served as Artstor's founding president. During his nine years at the Andrew W. Mellon Foundation before joining Artstor, he participated in the construction of large databases, wrote about educational policy issues and the missions of not-for-profit institutions, and worked in a range of research, administrative, and investment capacities. From 2016 to 2018, he served as a senior fellow in residence at Mellon.

Shulman originally joined the Andrew W. Mellon Foundation in 1994 as a member of the research staff and subsequently served as financial and administrative officer. He oversaw the building of the college and Beyond database with 34 participating colleges and universities, survey teams at Mathematica Policy Research and NORC, and foundation colleagues. Drawing upon the database, he collaborated with William G. Bowen and Derek Bok on The Shape of the River: Long-term Consequences of Considering Race in College and University Admissions (Princeton University Press, 1998). He also wrote (with William Bowen) The Game of Life: College Sports and Educational Values (Princeton University Press, 2001).

From 1997 to 2002, Shulman assisted in the management of the foundation's endowment. He also worked with the financial vice president on the foundation's internal budgeting. For the first half of 2000, Shulman managed these functions while the financial vice president was on sabbatical.

Shulman received his BA and Ph.D. from Yale University in Renaissance studies. His dissertation, which examined how heroes made decisions in the complex world of Renaissance epic poetry, received the John Addison Porter Prize in 1993 and forms the basis of The Pale Cast of Thought: Hesitation and Decision in the Renaissance Epic (University of Delaware Press, 1998). He also wrote the introduction to Robert K. Merton's The Travels and Adventures of Serendipity: A Study in Historical Semantics and the Sociology of Science (Princeton University Press, 2003).

Shulman serves on the board of The Renaissance Society of America and The Spence School. From 2006 to 2015, he served on the board of Smith College, where he sat on the campus life and investment committees. He chaired an ad hoc committee on admissions and financial aid issues and served as chair of Academic Affairs.
