= Russell Henry Chittenden House =

Historic house in Connecticut, US

- U.S. National Register of Historic Places
- U.S. National Historic Landmark
- U.S. Historic district – Contributing property
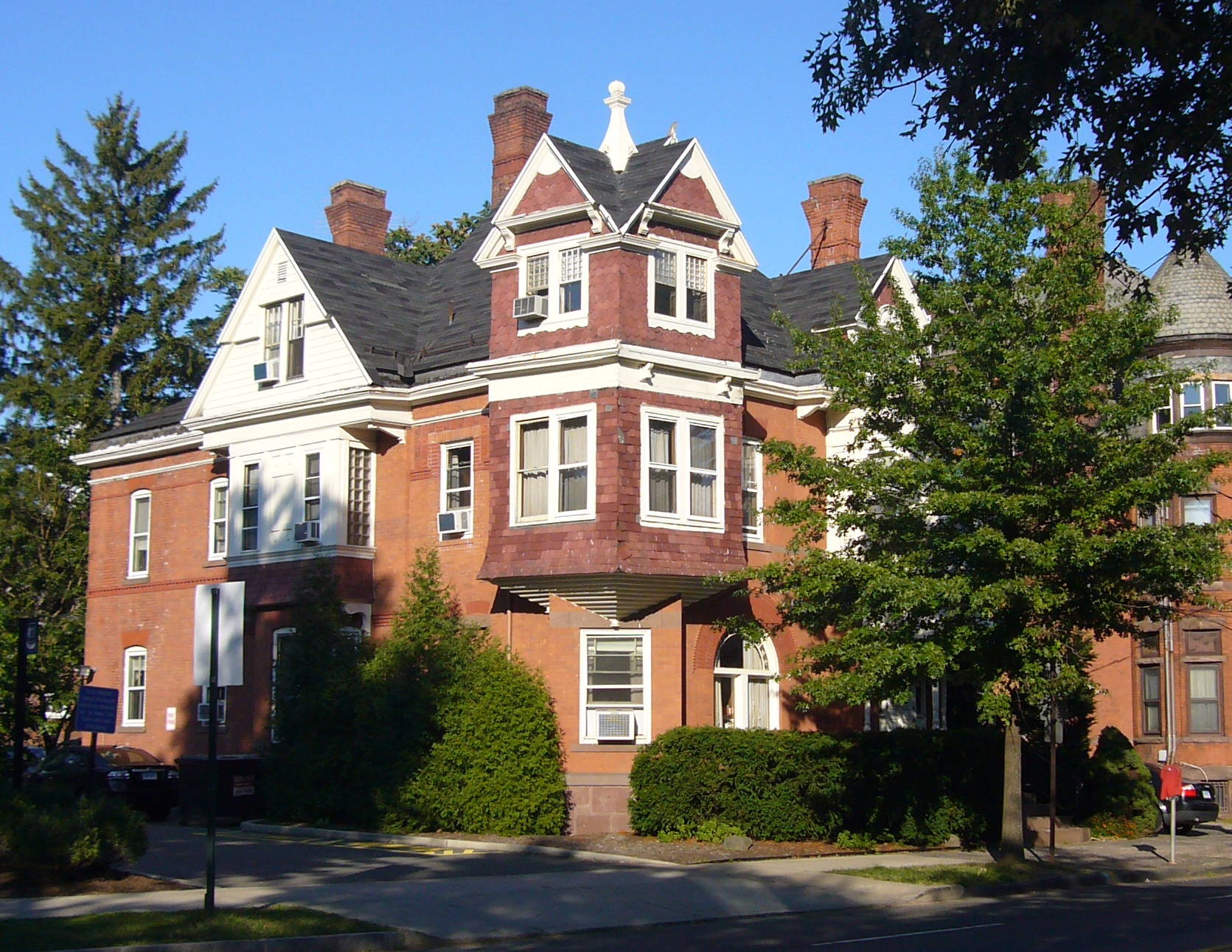

- Location within Connecticut Location within the United States
- Location: 83 Trumbull Street, New Haven, Connecticut
- Coordinates: 41°18′48.3″N 72°55′22.7″W
- Area: less than one acre
- Built: 1887
- Architectural style: Queen Anne
- Part of: Hillhouse Avenue Historic District (ID85002507)
- NRHP reference No.: 75001944

Significant dates
- Added to NRHP: May 15, 1975
- Designated NHL: May 15, 1975
- Designated CP: September 13, 1985

The Russell Henry Chittenden House is a historic house at 83 Trumbull Street in New Haven, Connecticut. Built in the 1880s, it was the longtime home of Russell Henry Chittenden, who lived there from 1887 to his death in 1943. Chittenden, known as the "father of American biochemistry", was a professor at Yale University, and the house was declared a National Historic Landmark in 1975 in recognition of his importance.

== Description and history ==
The Chittenden House is an irregularly shaped three-story brick structure with Queen Anne elements. It has projecting gabled sections, including a shingled projecting square turret at one corner. It has tall chimneys with corbelling and molded caps at the top. Although its interior has been remodeled to accommodate multiple units, the alterations retained much of the original interior decorative elements.

The house was purchased by Russell Henry Chittenden in 1887, probably from its builder, and was to remain his home until his death in 1943. Chittenden was born in New Haven in 1856, and studied chemistry at Yale. On a trip to Germany in 1878 to study with leading German chemists he became interested in the chemistry of digestion, which would become a lifelong study. He became a professor at Yale in 1882, and headed a laboratory in which the study of physiology and chemistry were combined. His principal innovations revolved around developing techniques and an understanding of the digestive process, in particular the role enzymes played in the breakdown of complex protein molecules. He also made early strides in the field of nutrition, setting the stage for later developments in that area. His influence also extended to the school itself, building one of the finest biochemistry departments in the nation.

The house was designated a National Historic Landmark and listed on the National Register of Historic Places in 1975. It is also a contributing building in New Haven's Hillhouse Avenue Historic District.

== See also ==
- List of National Historic Landmarks in Connecticut
- National Register of Historic Places listings in New Haven, Connecticut
