= Benedict Carton =

American historian

Benedict Carton is associate professor of history at George Mason University. He is a specialist in the history of Southern Africa and the author of Blood from Your Children: Colonial Origins of Generational Conflict in South Africa (University of Virginia Press, 2000; ISBN 978-0813919324).
