= Joseph Earl Sheffield =

American railroad executive, philanthropist

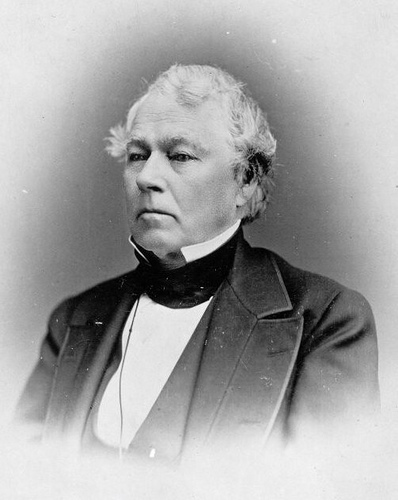
- Joseph Earl Sheffield
- Born: June 19, 1793; Southport, Connecticut, United States
- Died: February 17, 1882 (aged 88); New Haven, Connecticut, United States
- Occupation: Railroad executive
- Parent(s): Paul King Sheffield; Mabel (née Thorpe)
- Relatives: John Addison Porter (son-in-law)

Joseph Earl Sheffield (June 19, 1793 – February 17, 1882) was an American railroad magnate and philanthropist.

Sheffield was born in Southport, Connecticut, the son of Paul King Sheffield, a shipowner, and his wife Mabel (née Thorpe).

He attended public schools, and moved south to enter the cotton trade. He was a clerk in a drygoods store in New Bern, North Carolina, from 1807 to 1812, and moved to Mobile, Alabama, in 1813, where he became a very successful shipper of cotton. He married Maria St. John of Walton, New York, in 1822 and relocated to New Haven, Connecticut, in 1835. He became owner of the Farmington Canal, a charter member and a chief projector of the New York and New Haven Railroad company, and president of the New Haven and Northampton Company.

The town of Sheffield, Illinois, was founded by Sheffield and Henry Farnam in 1852. Sheffield and Farnam constructed the Chicago and Rock Island Railroad, and the townsite was intended as a coaling station for trains. According to Farnam, he and Sheffield flipped a coin to see for whom the town would be named. A monument to Joseph E. Sheffield and the Rock Island Railroad stands today in Sheffield's town square.

In New Haven, he lived on Hillhouse Avenue in a house designed and first occupied by Ithiel Town with later modifications by Henry Austin. It is believed that it was at his residence in 1853 that William Washington Gordon II met his future wife, Nellie Kinzie Gordon, for the first time. His canal, later replaced with a railroad, crossed Hillhouse near his home.

He gave Yale University a building for its scientific department, and a US$130,000 endowment for the school, which was renamed the Sheffield Scientific School in his honor.

His son-in-law, John Addison Porter was on the faculty. Other donations to Yale followed, including his house and funds which were used to build North Sheffield Hall, to enlarge the library, and for other purposes. Trinity College and the Theological Seminary of the Northwest also benefited from his donations.

Sheffield died in New Haven, Connecticut, and is buried in Grove Street Cemetery.
