= John Addison Porter (journalist) =

American journalist

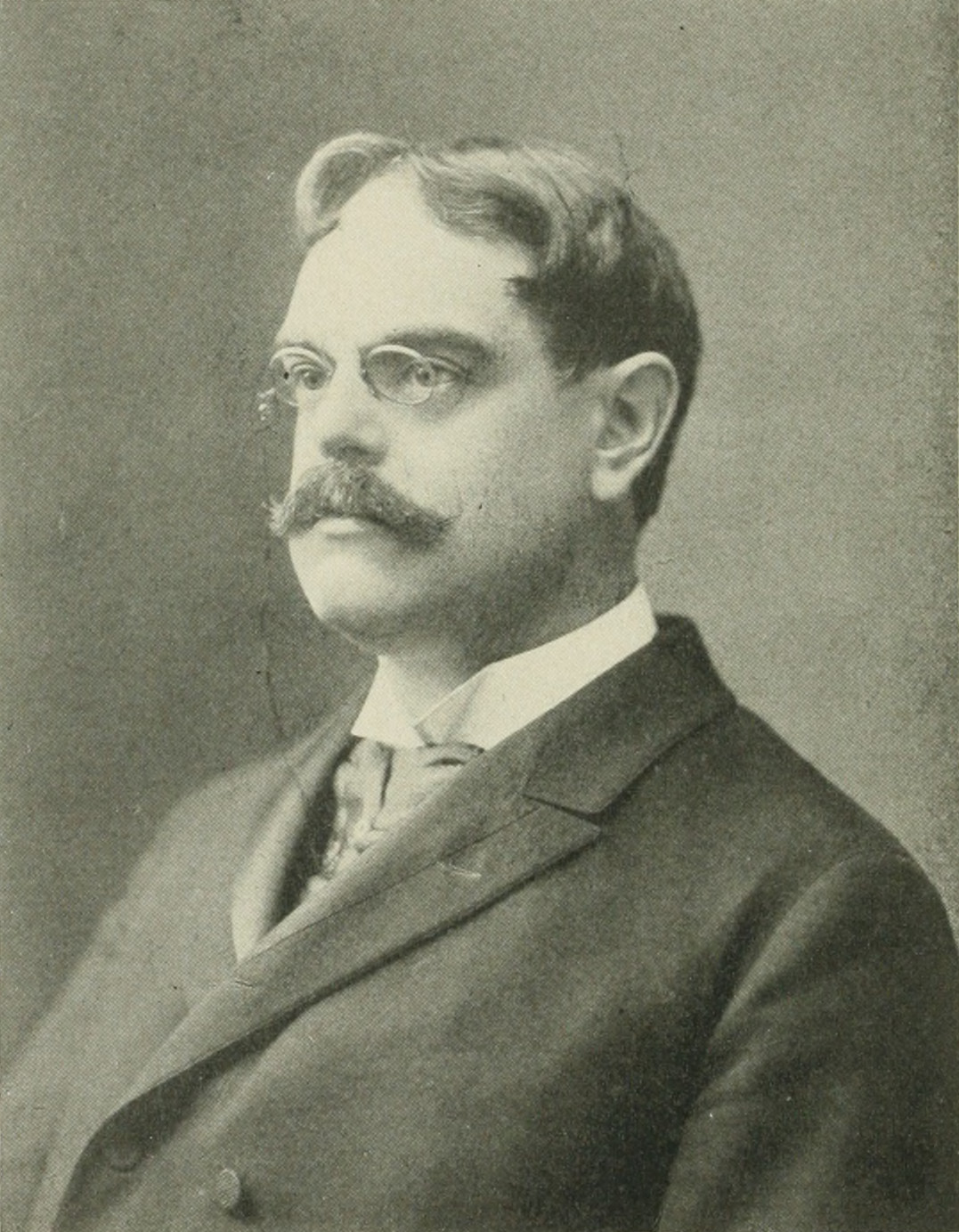

Secretary to the President
- In office March 4, 1897 – May 1, 1900
- President: William McKinley
- Preceded by: Henry T. Thurber (as Private Secretary)
- Succeeded by: George B. Cortelyou

Member of the Connecticut House of Representatives
- In office 1892

Personal details
- Born: April 17, 1856 New Haven, Connecticut, U.S.
- Died: December 15, 1900 (aged 44) Pomfret, Connecticut, U.S.
- Resting place: New Haven, Connecticut; United States
- Party: Republican
- Spouse: Amy Ellen Betts
- Children: Josephine Earl Porter Van Name
- Parent(s): John Addison Porter and Josephine Earl Sheffield
- Relatives: Joseph Earl Sheffield (grandfather); Rep. William Walter Phelps (uncle)
- Education: Yale College; Russell Military Academy; Hopkins Grammar School
- Occupation: First "Secretary to the President" (1897–1900); Journalist

John Addison Porter (April 17, 1856 – December 15, 1900) was an American journalist, and the first person to hold the position of "Secretary to the President". He was born in New Haven, Connecticut, and died in Pomfret, Connecticut.

== Academic and professional life ==
Porter attended Hopkins Grammar School and the Russell Military Academy at New Haven, and graduated from Yale College with an A.B. in 1878. As an undergraduate, he served on the sixth editorial board of The Yale Record. He received an A.M. in American history from Yale in 1881. He studied law with his uncle, William Jarvis Boardman, in Cleveland, Ohio, but never practiced that profession.

In 1880 he joined the staff of the Hartford Observer. He was also a reporter for a brief time on the New Haven Daily Palladium and on the Hartford Courant. In 1882 he became literary editor of the New York Observer. Moving to Washington, D.C., he continued his newspaper work.

In 1884 he served as secretary to his uncle William Walter Phelps, a member of the House of Representatives, and also served as a clerk on the select Senate committee on Indian affairs.

Moving to Pomfret, Connecticut in 1886, he purchased a third interest in the Hartford Evening Post, and became managing editor and editor-in-chief. He sold the paper in 1899.

In 1886, he organized and ran the Oregon Publishing Company, which took over the Portland Evening Telegram newspaper (founded 1877). The Telegram, a Republican-leaning newspaper, merged in 1931 with the Portland News, creating the Portland News-Telegram, which in turn ceased publishing in 1939.

In 1887 illness obliged him to spend the winter in the South; returning north he purchased an estate in Pomfret, Connecticut, which became his final home.

In 1891 he served as a representative from Pomfret in the Connecticut legislature. In 1892 he was a delegate to the Republican national convention in Minneapolis. In 1894, 1896 and 1898 he was considered as a Republican nominee for governor of Connecticut, but was ultimately not chosen. He was influential in persuading the Connecticut delegate to the St. Louis convention to cast their votes for William McKinley.

In 1893 he organized and became president of the McKinley Club of Hartford, the first McKinley club of the country.

McKinley appointed him Secretary to the President of the United States in February 1897. Illness, dating from about spring 1899, interfered with his duties, and he resigned the position on May 1, 1900.

He died of a malignant intestinal disease in December 1900 at age 44.

He was the author of:

- The Corporation of Yale College, 1885
- Origin and Administration of the City of Washington, 1885
- Sketches of Yale Life, 1886

== Personal life ==
John Addison Porter was the elder son of John Addison Porter, a professor of chemistry at Yale University, and his wife, née Josephine Earl Sheffield, daughter of Joseph Earl Sheffield, founder of Yale's Sheffield Scientific School.

In 1882 he married Amy Ellen Betts, granddaughter of Judge Samuel Betts of New York. In 1901 she founded the John Addison Porter Prize in American History at Yale University in memory of her husband.

== John Addison Porter Prize in American History ==
The John Addison Porter Prize in American History for undergraduate history majors was established in 1901 by Mrs. Amy Betts Porter in memory of her husband. There are two other Yale endowments that commemorate John Addison Porter. The first, the John Addison Porter Memorial Fellowship was established in 1901 by Mrs. Josephine S. Porter in memory of her husband and her son, both named John Addison Porter, and given for distinguished excellence and promise in the Department of English. The other is the John Addison Porter University Prize, established by the Kingsley Trust Association in 1901 in continuance of a prize offered by that society annually since 1872, open to all in the university, given in honor of the father, a founder of that society.

Winners of the undergraduate John Addison Porter Prize for outstanding senior essays or the John Addison Porter Prize for outstanding graduate dissertations have included:

- 1902: C. S. Thompson, for The Rise and Fall of the Congressional Caucus as a Machine for Nominating Candidates for the Presidency
- 1910: William S. Culbertson, for Alexander Hamilton: An Essay
- 1918: Lawrence H. Gipson, for Jared Ingersoll: A Study of American Loyalism in Relation to British Colonial Government
- 1921: George Stewart, Jr., for A History of Religious Education in Connecticut to the Middle of the Nineteenth Century
- 1923: Dumas Malone, for The Public Life of Thomas Cooper, 1783–1839
- 1928: George Herbert Ryden, for The Foreign Policy of the United States in Relation to Samoa
- 1929: Stanley McCrory Pargellis, for Lord Loudoun in North America
- 1934: Charles Roy Keller, for The Second Great Awakening in Connecticut
- 1937: Richard Irving Galland
- 1940: Liston Pope, for Millhands & Preachers: A Study of Gastonia
- 1983: Timothy Naftali
- 1985: Jeffrey A. Meyer, for Politics and Planning: Public Housing in Mount Vernon, New York
- 1989: Dale Carpenter
- 2006: Stephen Butler
- 2010: Philip Gant
- 2021: Kaley Pillinger and Keshav Raghavan
- 2024: Rachel Bitutsky and Elisa Kravitz
- 2025: Carmen Lopez Villamil and Jenesis Nwainokpor
