= Hillhouse Avenue =

- Hillhouse Avenue Historic District
- U.S. National Register of Historic Places
- U.S. Historic district
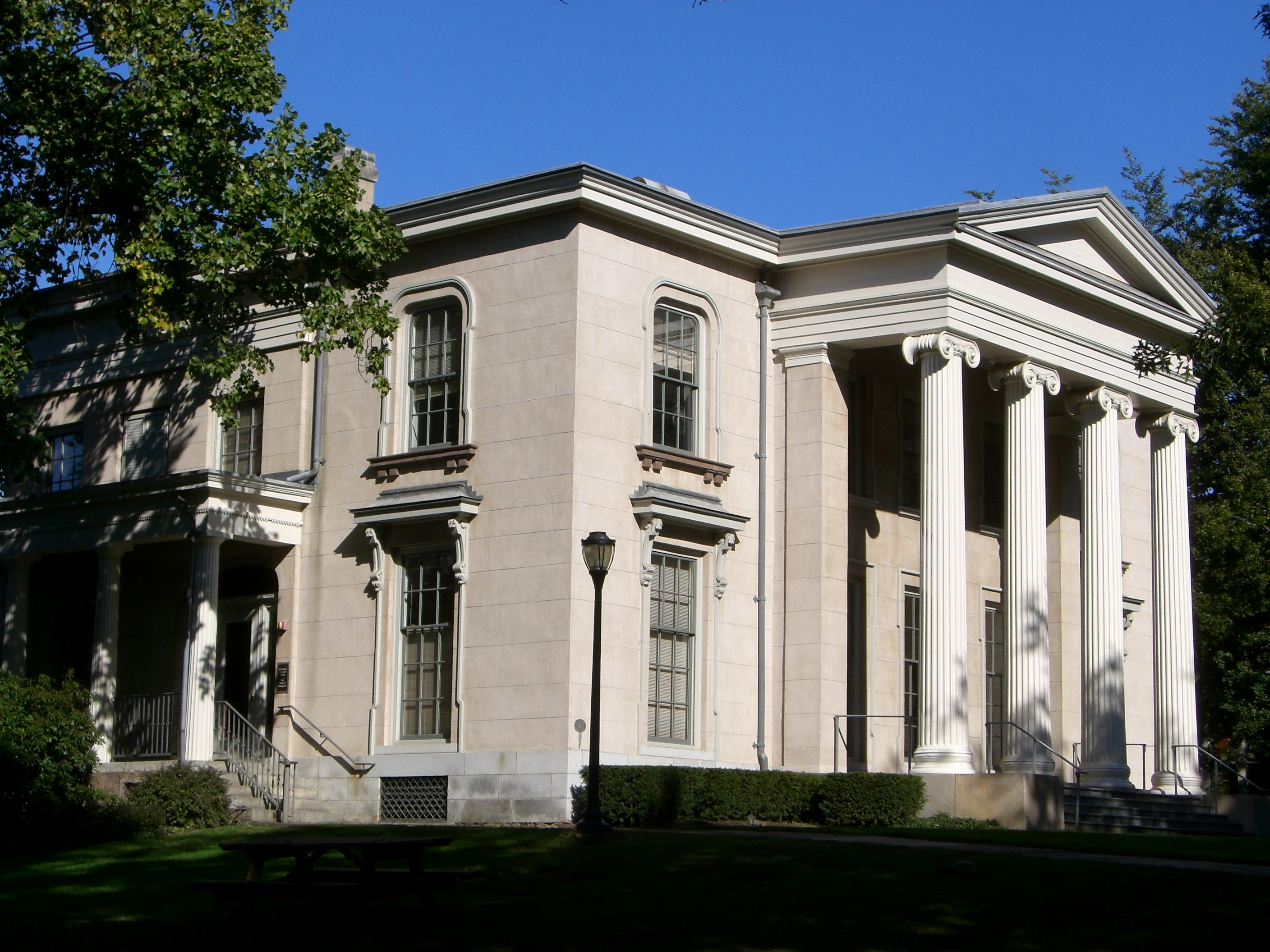
- Skinner House, Town and Davis, 1832

- Location within Connecticut Location within the United States
- Location: Bounded by Sachem, Temple, Trumbull, and Prospect Streets, Whitney and Hillhouse Avenues & Railroad Tracks, New Haven, Connecticut
- Coordinates: 41°18′52.2″N 72°55′23.6″W
- Area: 18 acres (7.3 ha)
- Built: 1792
- Architect: Town and Davis, Henry Austin, et al.
- Architectural style: Victorian
- NRHP reference No.: 85002507
- Added to NRHP: September 13, 1985

Hillhouse Avenue is a Street in New Haven, Connecticut, famous for its many nineteenth century mansions, including the president's house at Yale University. Both Charles Dickens and Mark Twain described it as "the most beautiful street in America". Much of the avenue is included in the Hillhouse Avenue Historic District, which extends to include houses on adjacent streets.

== History ==
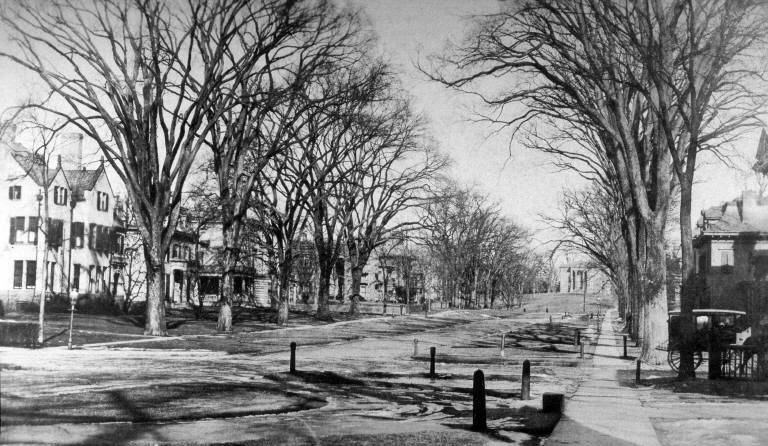
The street's mansions were completed by 1892. In this 1905 photograph, Sachem's Wood is still visible.

The avenue is named for James Hillhouse (1754–1832) (and his son James Abraham Hillhouse, 1789–1841), innovator in land use in New Haven, who began the program of tree planting that gave New Haven its nickname, The Elm City, and who laid out the Trumbull Plan for Yale College and the Grove Street Cemetery.

Hillhouse Avenue was initially called Temple Avenue, and was staked out, 150 feet (46 m) wide, by Hillhouse employee, and later Yale president, Jeremiah Day, in 1792. The avenue ran from the Green at Temple Street to a hilltop location where James Abraham Hillhouse built the family mansion, Highwood (later called Sachem's Wood), in 1828. The houses along the wide avenue were set back with room for trees creating a park-like effect. The elms which once shaded the street were lost to Dutch elm disease, but mature oak trees have largely taken their place.

The avenue was privately owned until 1862. Because of the nature of the street, its lots, and its orientation to the nine-square-grid of New Haven (the nation's first planned city), Hillhouse Avenue is sometimes considered to be the first suburb in the United States.

The Hillhouse mansion was razed in 1942 in accordance with a directive in the will of James Abraham Hillhouse's daughter, Isaphene. In time, Hillhouse Avenue came to be divided into an upper, residential area, and a lower portion for public buildings and the Farmington Canal. It is now just two blocks long, running from Grove to Sachem. The upper portion of the avenue, along with the adjacent blocks (and the Dana House), was designated the Hillhouse Avenue Historic District on the National Register of Historic Places in 1985.

== Buildings ==
Yale now owns all of the properties on Hillhouse Avenue except for St. Mary's Church and its parish house. The mansions of the upper area have been restored and converted for use by the Yale Jackson School of Global Affairs, the Yale economics department, and for other functions. Lower Hillhouse primarily includes university buildings, a number of them formerly part of the Sheffield Scientific School. There are several houses designed by architects Ithiel Town, Henry Austin and Alexander Jackson Davis. The area at the end of the avenue where Hillhouse's mansion stood is now part of the Science Hill section of Yale's campus.

Notable buildings on Hillhouse Avenue that are included in the historic district are:

- James Dwight Dana House, designed by Henry Austin, built 1845-1848. Home to the Yale Statistics Department for many years, and listed as a U.S. National Historic Landmark.
- Charles Henry Farnam House, J. Cleaveland Cady, 1884. Queen Anne style.
- Wheeler-English House, 1884. This Queen Anne/Romanesque Revival houses the Cowles Foundation at Yale.
- Abigail Whelpey House (Allwin Hall, Program on Ethics, Politics and Economics), 1826. The oldest house standing on Hillhouse. This Federal structure was altered in the 1860s with a mansard roof and dormer windows by Noah Porter, later President of Yale.
- Mary Prichard House, 1836. This Greek revival design by Alexander Jackson Davis includes a two-story Corinthian porch with white columns. It is also known as the Provost's House and has been used to house Yale administration.
- Graves-Gilman House (now 37 Hillhouse), 1866. Victorian Italian Villa. Home of Sheffield professor, Daniel Coit Gilman. Converted into apartments for married Yale students (1946–1957). George H. W. Bush lived here while he was a student and his son lived here until the age of two. Now used by the Yale Center for Geospatial Solutions after a major renovation.
- Henry F. English House, 1892. Classical revival mansion, designed by Bruce Price. Home of the Yale University Office of Undergraduate Admissions.
- Henry Farnam House, Russell Sturgis, 1871. Redesigned with Victorian features removed in 1934. It has been the home of Yale's presidents since 1937.
- Skinner-Boardman House (Jackson School, formerly Yale Astronomy, Yale International Center of Finance), Town and Davis, 1832. Landmark Greek Revival.
- Graves-Dwight House, 1862. This villa is now used by the Yale Anthropology Department.
- John Pitkin Norton House (Steinbach Hall, Jackson School, formerly Yale Astronomy Department, formerly Yale School of Management), 1849. Tuscan/Italian Villa on Hillhouse Avenue designed by Henry Austin.
- Pelitiah Perit House (Horchow Hall, Jackson School, formerly Yale School of Management), Sidney Mason Stone, 1859. Renaissance revival/Tuscan.
- Apthorp House (Evans Hall, Jackson School, formerly Yale Astronomy, formerly Yale School of Management), Town and Davis, 1836 (with extensive subsequent remodeling).

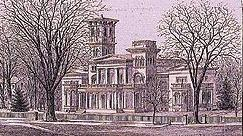
Sheffield-Town Mansion, Hillhouse Avenue

Buildings on lower Hillhouse Avenue, outside of the historic district, include:

- Cloister Hall (now Warner House), 1888. Brownstone building originally served the Book and Snake fraternity of the Sheffield School.
- Kirtland Hall, Dunham Laboratory, Mason Laboratory, Leet Oliver Memorial Hall. Yale University buildings originally part of the Sheffield Scientific School.
- St. Mary's Church and parish house.
- Sheffield-Town Mansion. Ithiel Town, 1836. Additions for Joseph Earl Sheffield by Henry Austin in 1859. Razed in 1957.
- Yale University Collection of Musical Instruments, 1895. Romanesque structure built originally for the Alpha Delta Phi fraternity.

Significant properties not on Hillhouse Avenue, but included in the historic district, include:

- Russell Henry Chittenden House, at 83 Trumbull Street, listed as a National Historic Landmark.
- Wolf's Head, built in 1883, designed by McKim, Mead & White, Richardsonian Romanesque with stepped end gables, former home of Wolf's Head Society. Now owned by Yale, it currently houses the Yale Institution for Social and Policy Studies.
- William Lyon Phelps House, 1908–1909, at 110 Whitney Avenue, Colonial Revival
- a second William Lyon Phelps House, 1914, at 114 Whitney Avenue, designed by J. Frederick Kelly, "one of New Haven's finest Colonial Revival-style structures"

== Images ==
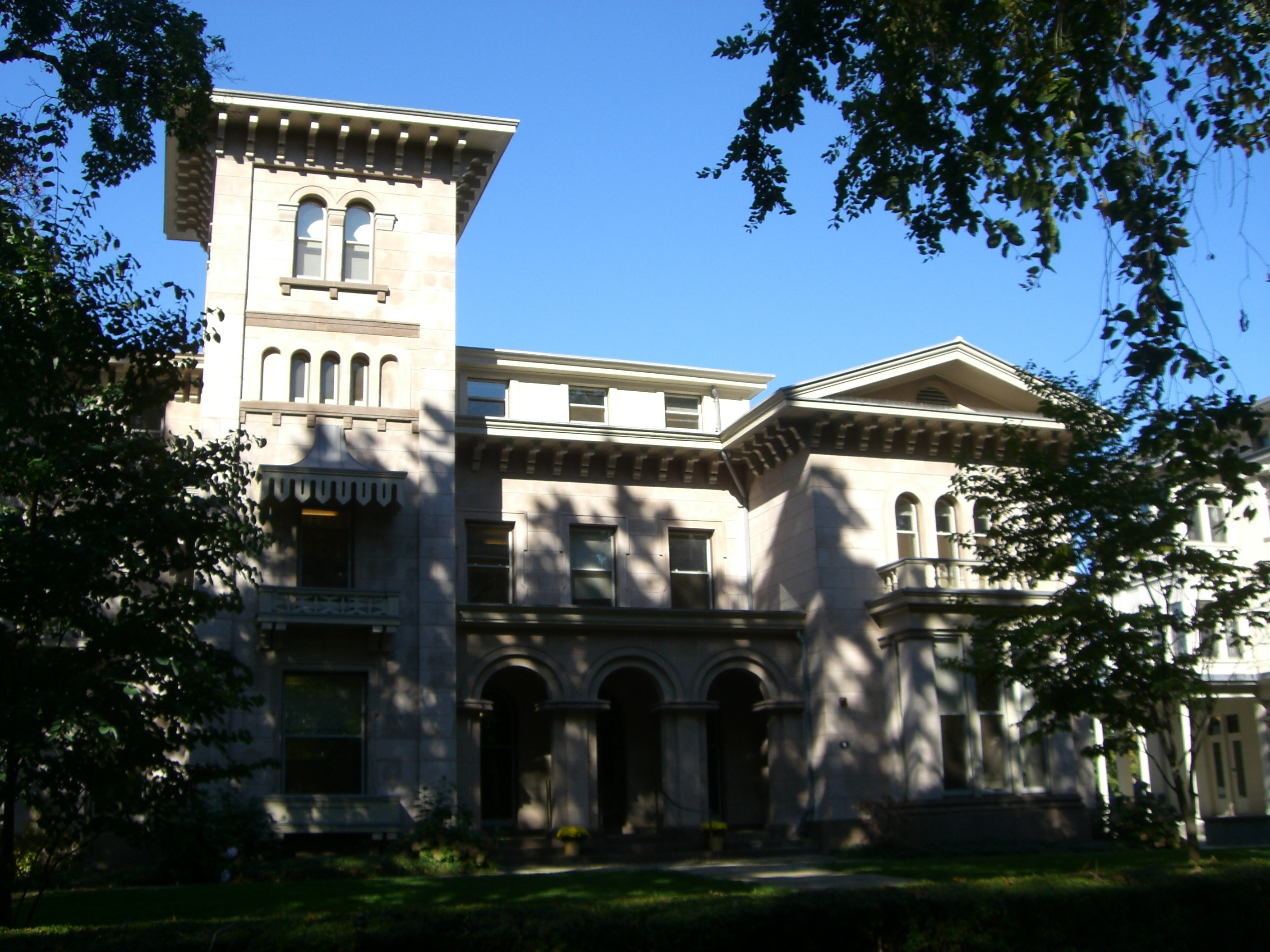
John Norton House

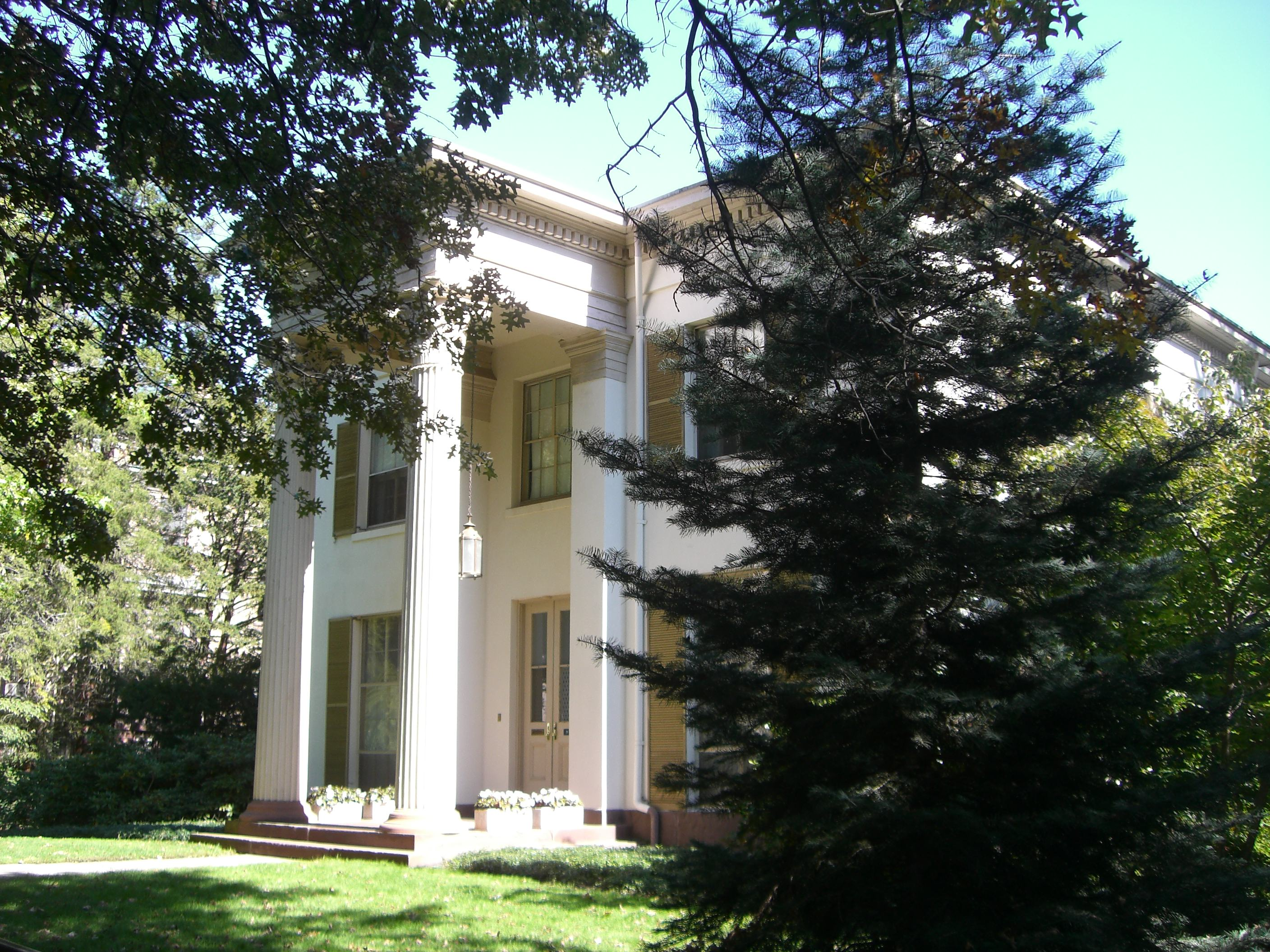
Mary Prichard House

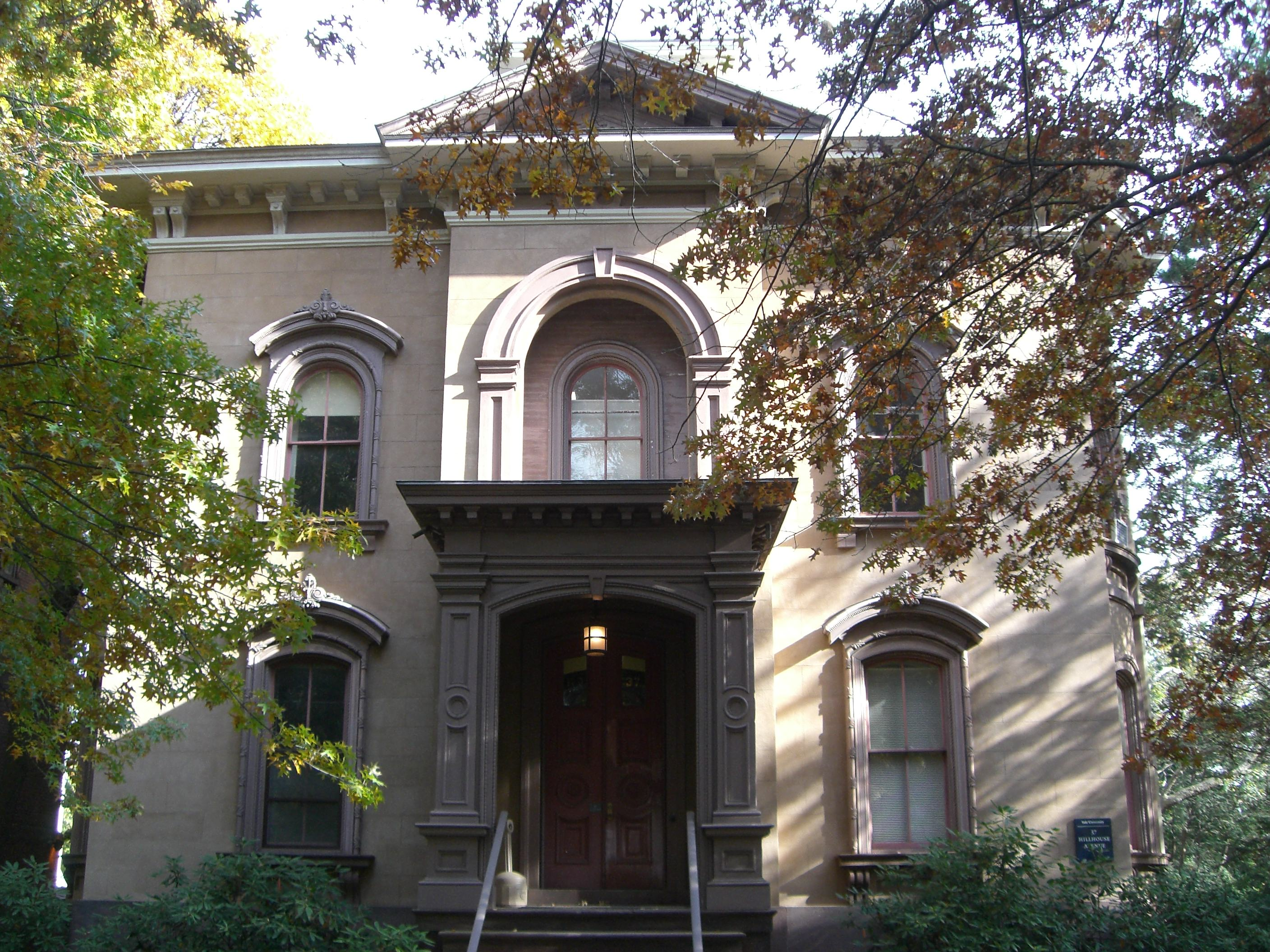
Graves-Gillman House

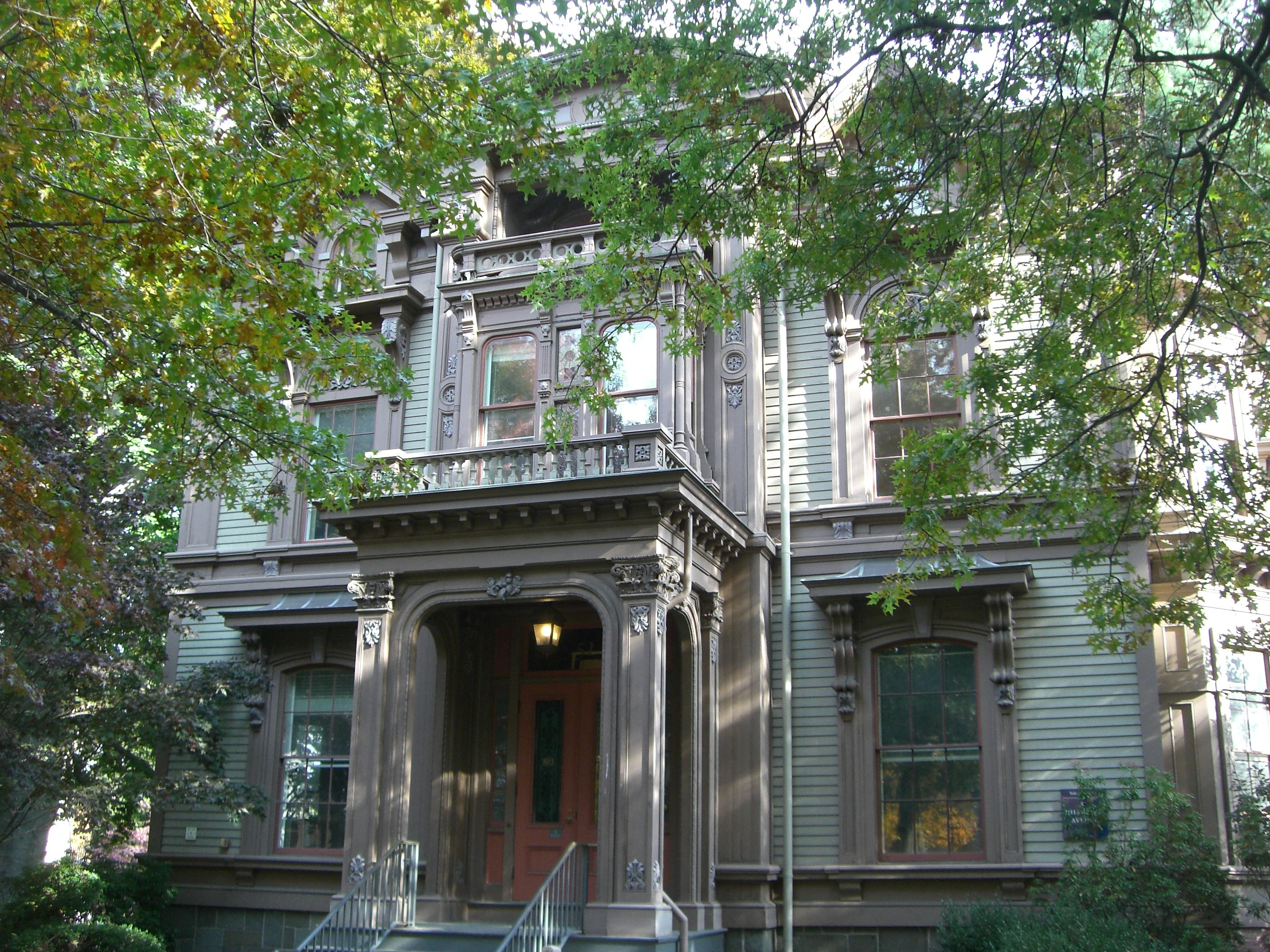
Graves-Dwight House

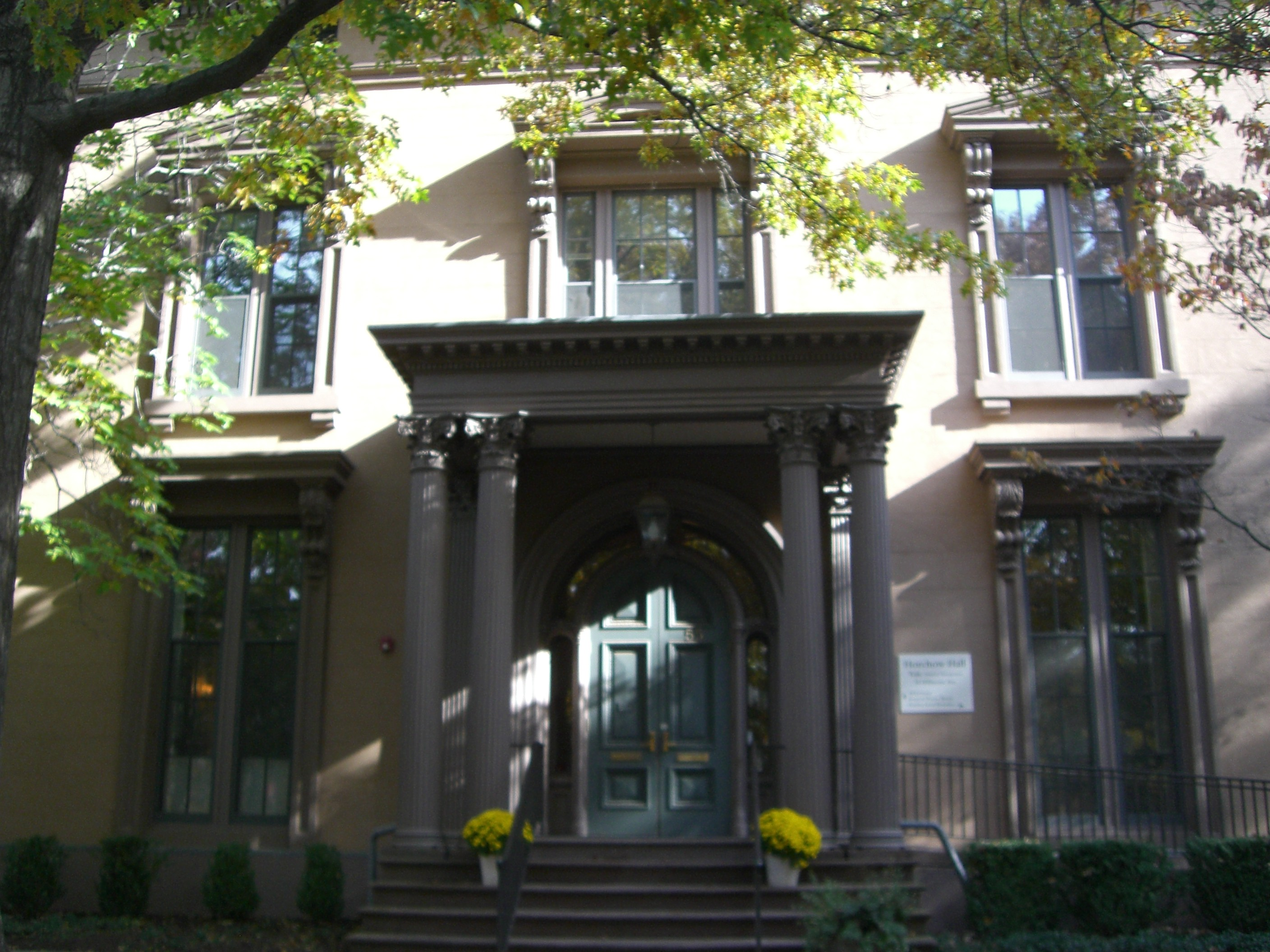
Peletiah Perit House

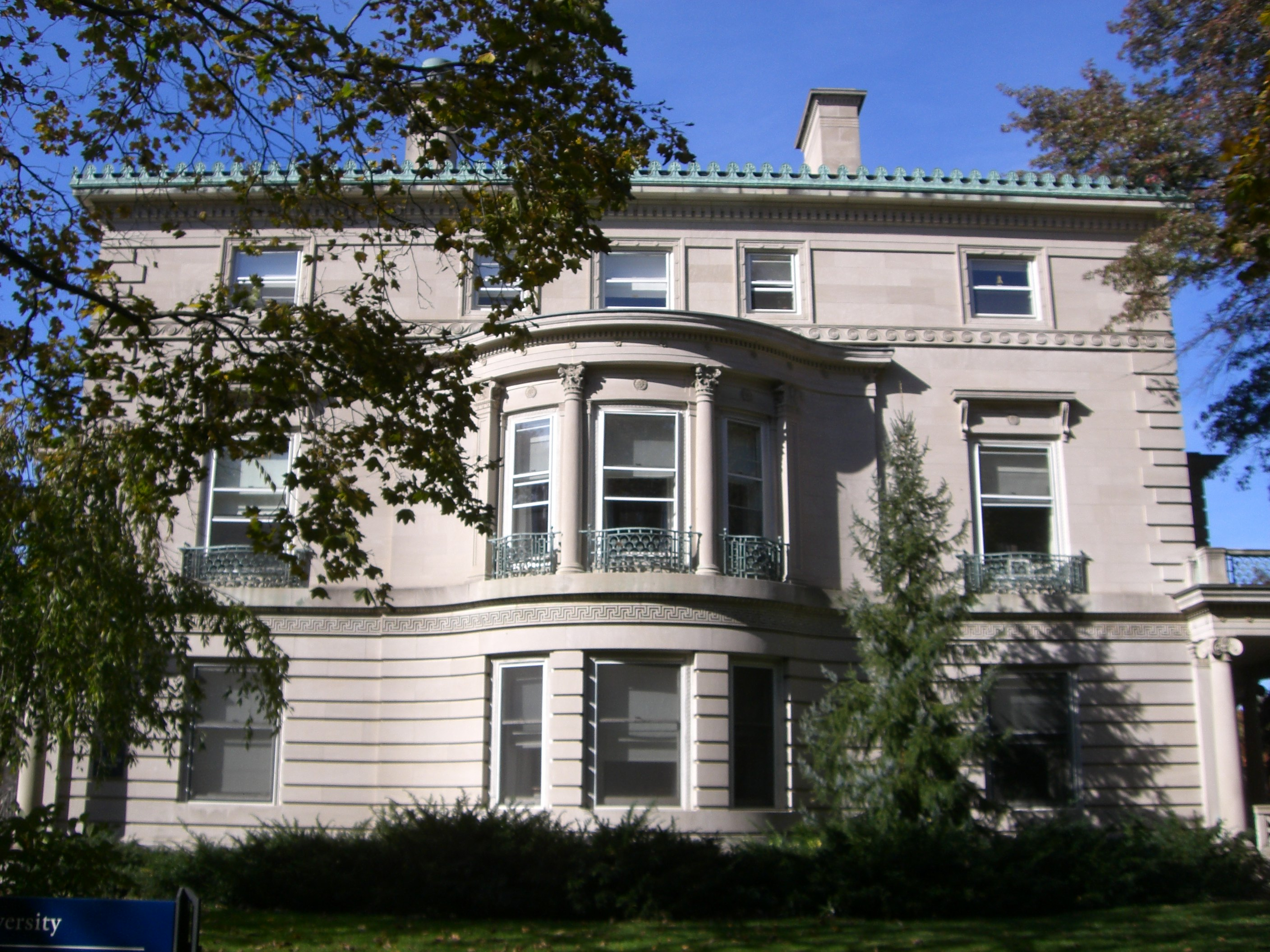
Henry English House

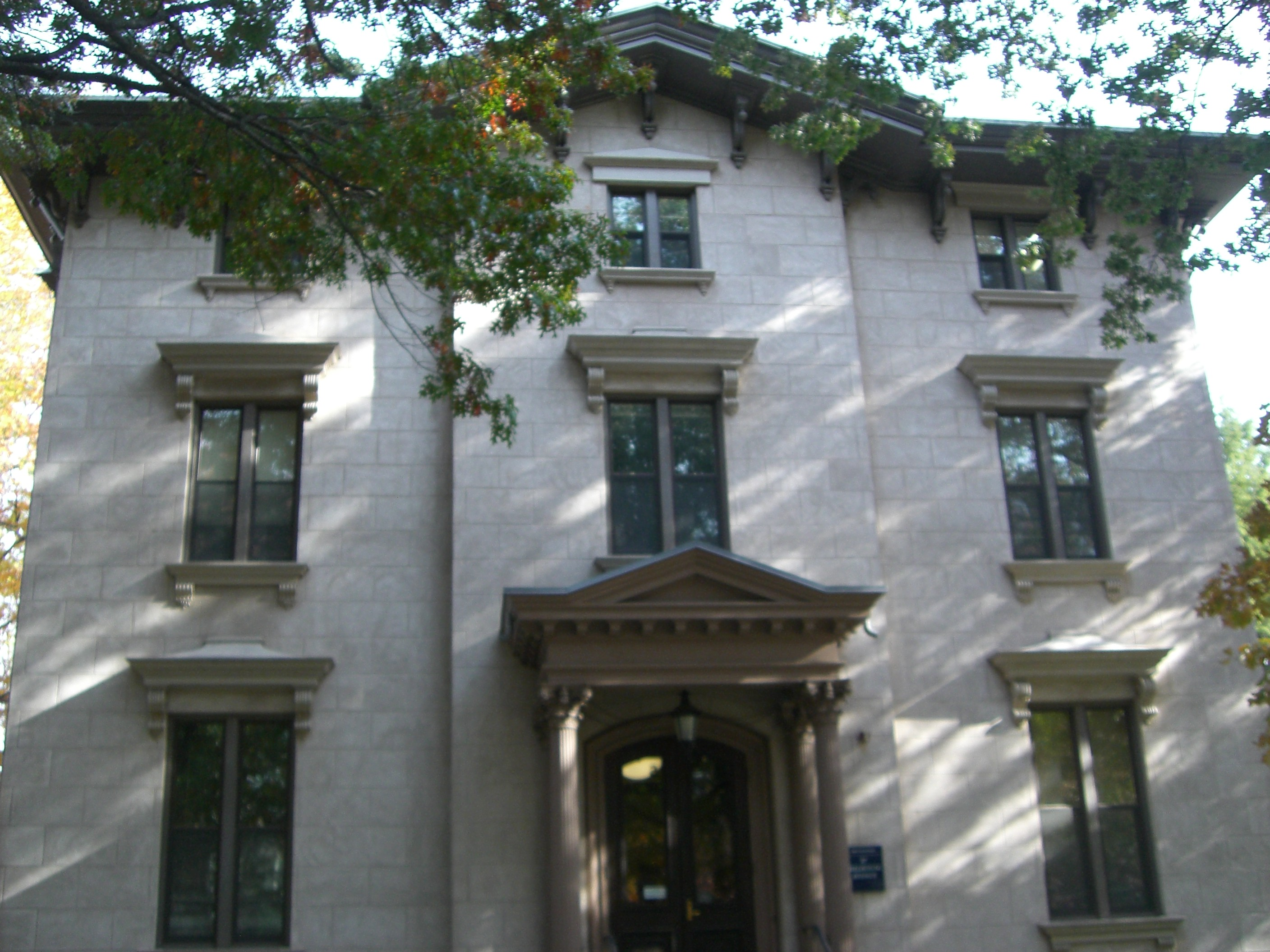
George Fisher House

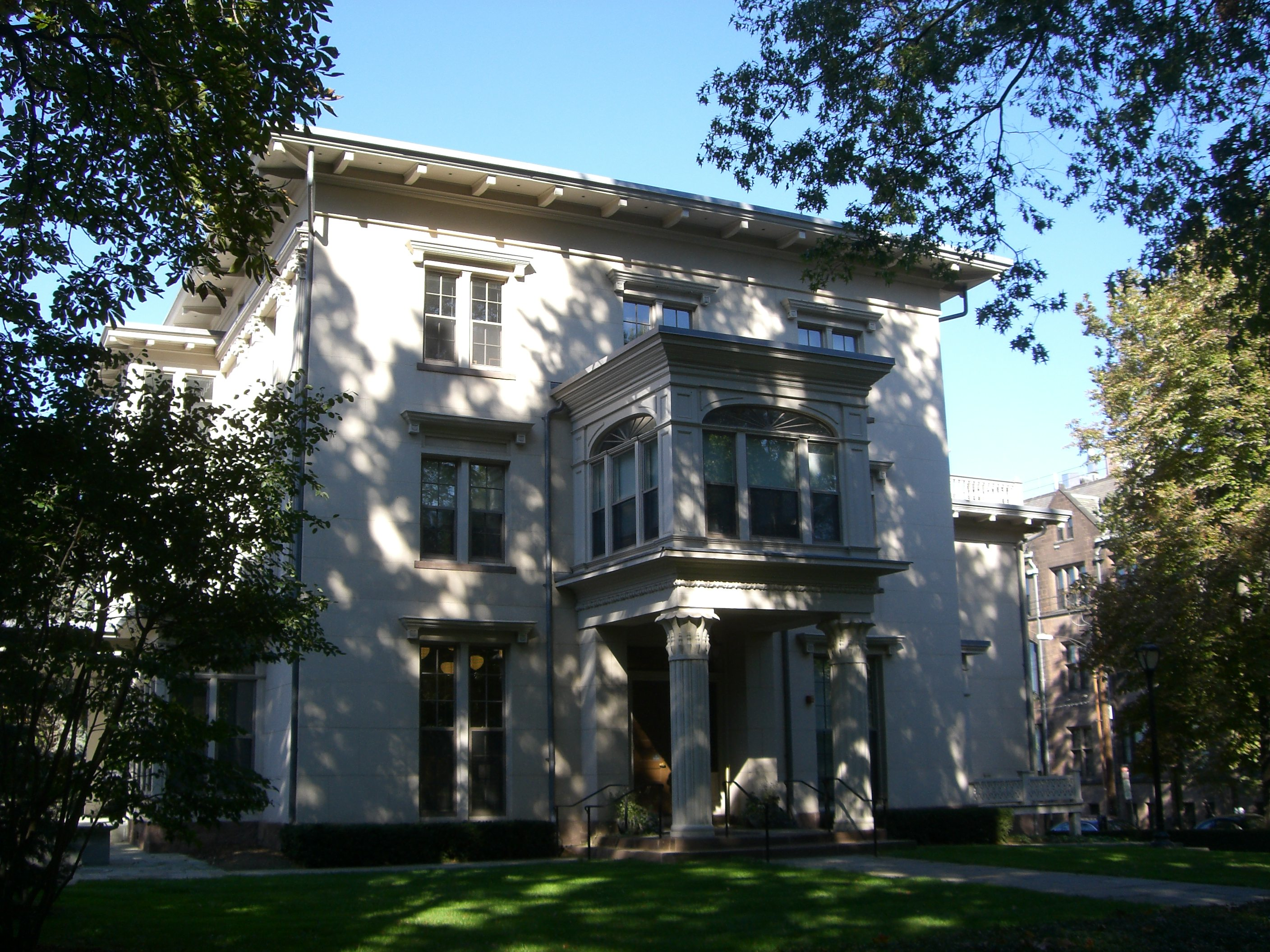
Elizabeth Apthorp House

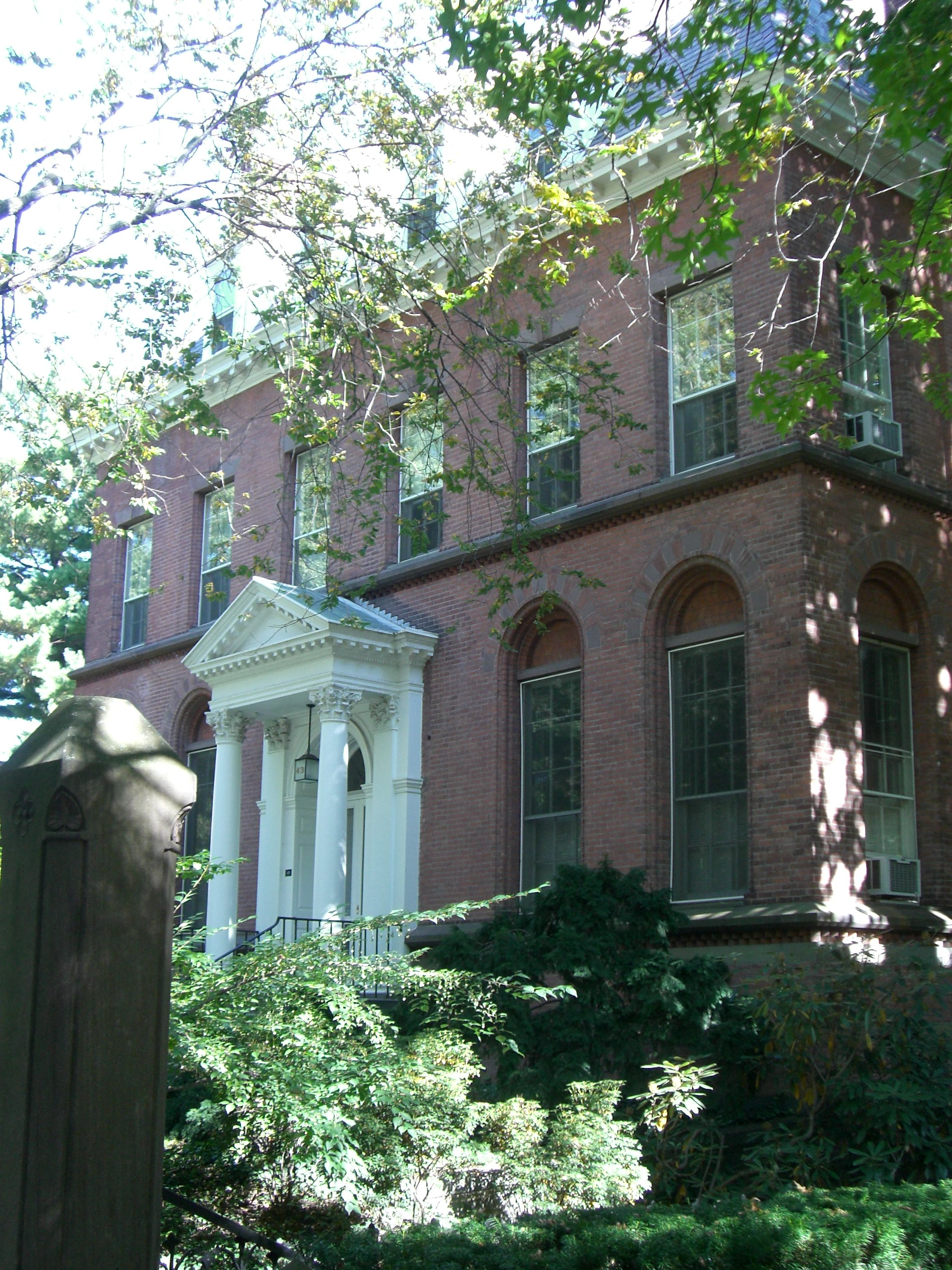
Henry Farnam House

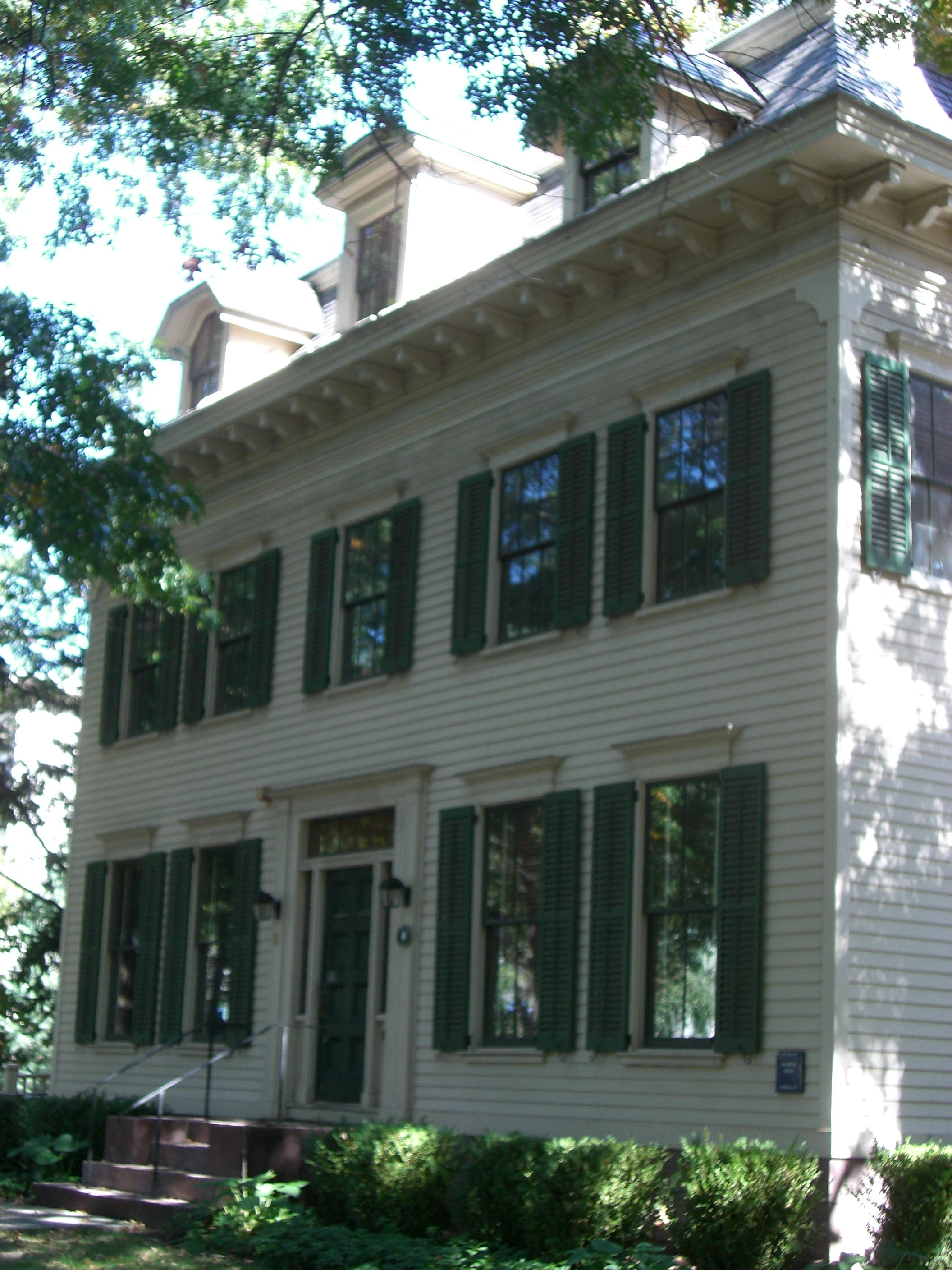
Abigail Whelpey House

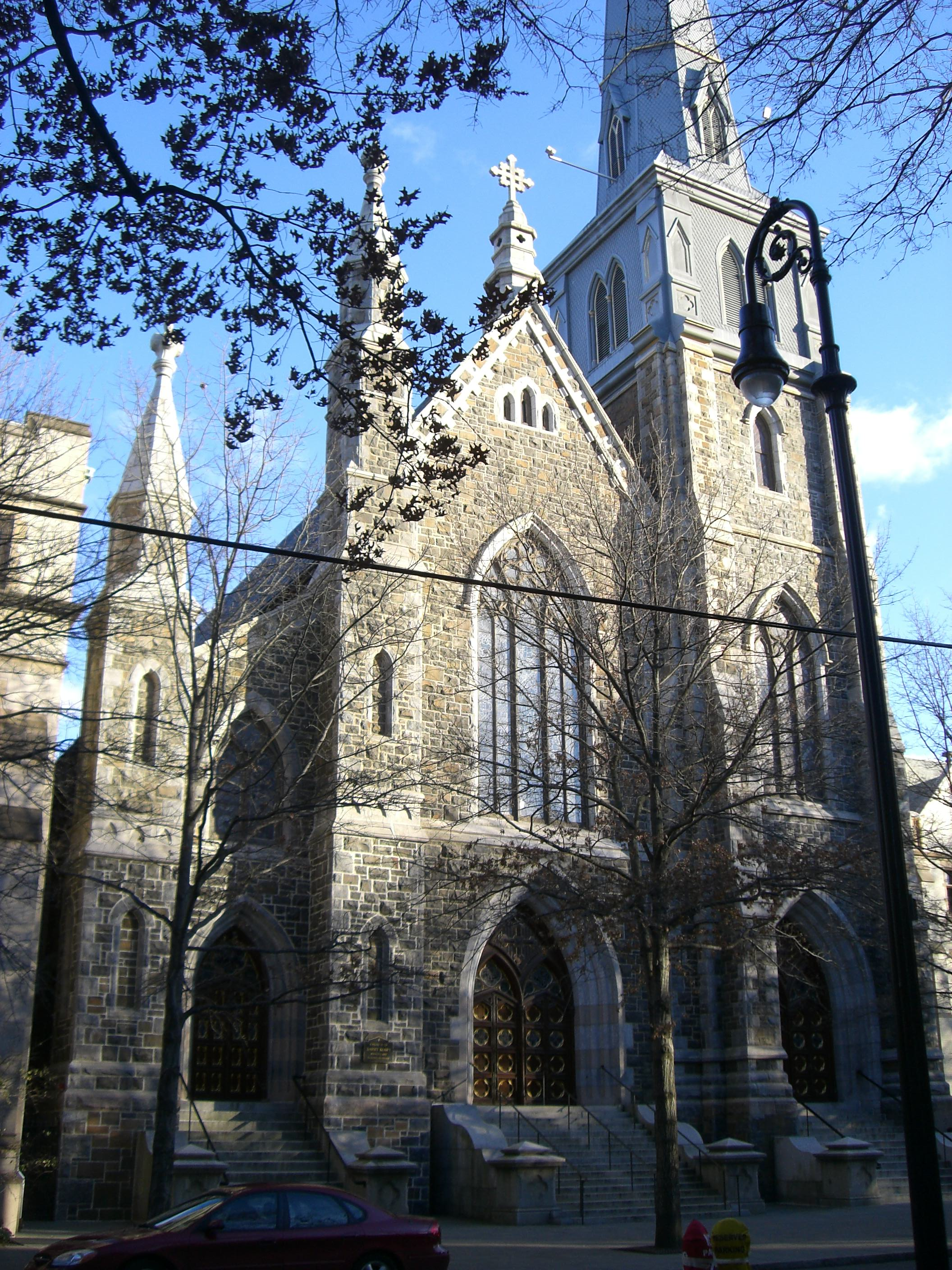
St. Mary's Church

== See also ==
- National Register of Historic Places listings in New Haven, Connecticut

== Sources ==
- Holden, Reuben A., Yale: A Pictorial History, Yale University Press, New Haven, 1967.
- Pinnell, Patrick L., Yale University: The Campus Guide, Princeton Architectural Press, New York, 1999.
- Kelley, Brooks Mather, New Haven Heritage, New Haven Preservation Trust, 1974.
- Hillhouse Avenue Historic District, New Haven Preservation Trust
