= Horchow Hall =

Yale University building

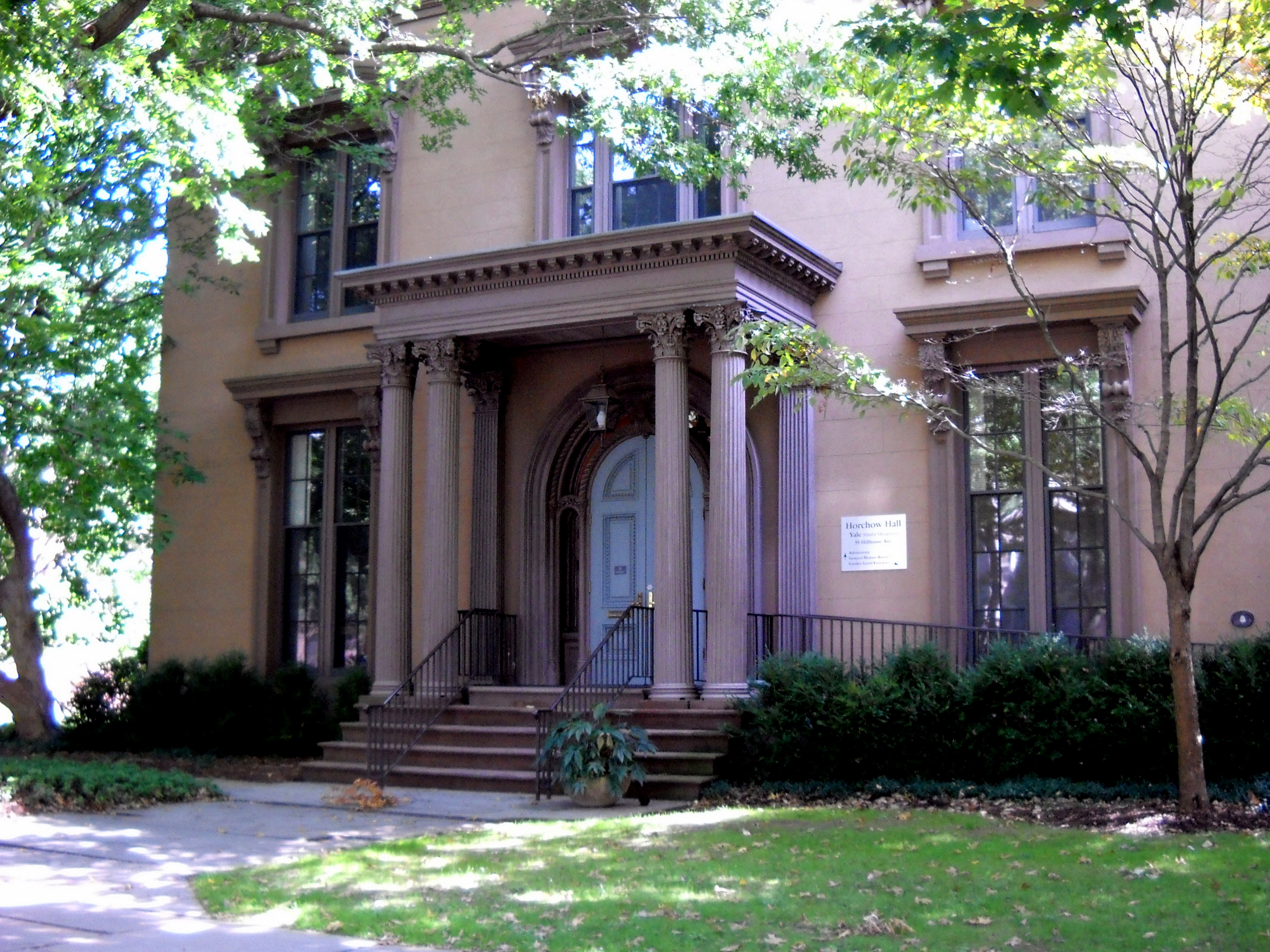
- Interactive map of the Horchow Hall area

General information
- Location: 55 Hillhouse Avenue, New Haven, Connecticut, United States
- Coordinates: 41°18′56″N 72°55′21″W
- Completed: 1860
- Owner: Yale University

Design and construction
- Architect: Sidney Mason Stone

Horchow Hall, also known as the Peletiah Perit House, is a historic building on the campus of Yale University in New Haven, Connecticut, U.S.

== History ==
The house was built in 1860 for Pelatiah Perit. It was home to the Yale School of Management until 2013, when the Jackson School of Global Affairs (formerly named the Jackson Institute for Global Affairs) moved into the house.

== Architectural significance ==
The house was designed by architect Sidney Mason Stone in the Renaissance Revival style, as an Italian villa. It includes a "cupola, elaborate scroll brackets supporting window pediments and single-story front entry portico with paired Corinthian columns sheltering a semicircular-arch doorway with rope molding bordering the frame, large room addition on rear."

It has been listed on the National Register of Historic Places as a contributing property to the Hillhouse Avenue Historic District since September 13, 1985.
