= Yale Jackson School of Global Affairs =

School of Yale University

Coordinates: 41.3148°N 72.9244°W

- Coat of arms of the school
- Former name: Yale University Jackson Institute for Global Affairs (2010–2022)
- Type: Private
- Established: 2022; 4 years ago
- Parent institution: Yale University
- Affiliations: APSIA
- Dean: Jim Levinsohn
- Location: New Haven, Connecticut, United States
- Campus: Urban
- Website: jackson.yale.edu

The Yale Jackson School of Global Affairs (formerly the Jackson Institute for Global Affairs) is the professional school of international studies at Yale University, located in New Haven, Connecticut. Established in 2022, it is Yale's newest professional school. It offers undergraduate, graduate, and professional education programs.

Its predecessor, the Jackson Institute for Global Affairs, was originated in 2010 and transitioned to a professional school under a decision by the Yale Corporation in 2022. It is the first new Yale professional school created since 1976. The Dean, who leads the school, is Jim Levinsohn. In September 2024, former British Prime Minister Theresa May was named as the center’s inaugural Blue Senior Fellow.

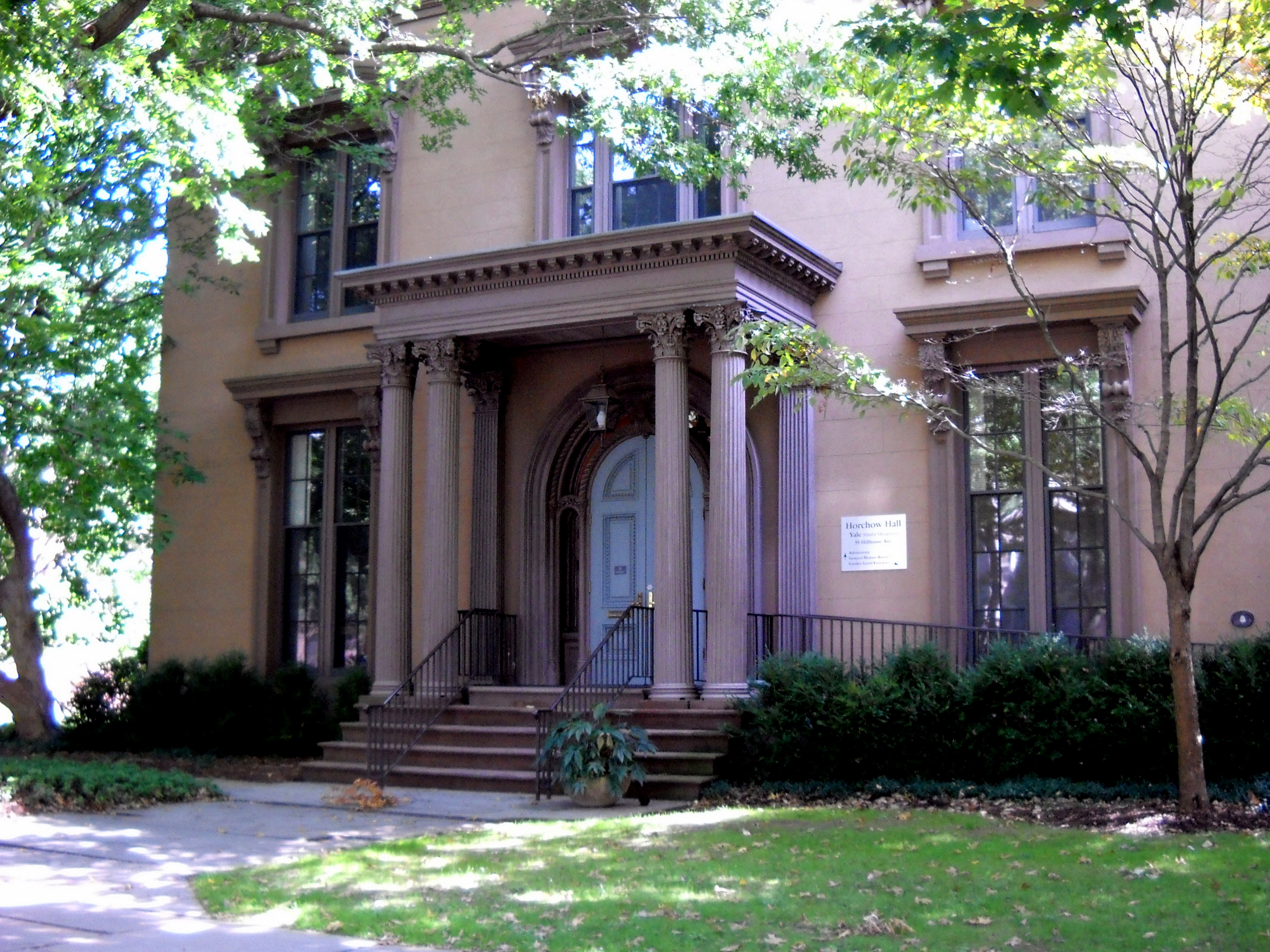
Horchow Hall.

== Academics ==
The Jackson School of Global Affairs is located in Horchow Hall on New Haven's historic Hillhouse Avenue. The building formerly housed the Yale School of Management.

Undergraduate students in Yale College can apply under a competitive admission to be considered for the Global Affairs major, where around 60 students per class are selected. The major provides an interdisciplinary curriculum to supply students with social science research tools to solve global issues. A requirement of the major is the Capstone Course, undertaken in the fall of senior year, in which students complete a project on behalf of a real client, under supervision of a faculty member; this replaces the traditional senior thesis completed by other Yale seniors.

Graduate students can apply for a Master's in Global Affairs, where around 25 - 30 students are selected. Each student undertakes their own individualized course selection, allowing them to study from Yale faculty in all disciplines; in addition, students can also participate in seminars provided by Senior Fellows. The degree is different from those offered by most other similar institutions, in that it prepares students for a professional environment, rather than an academic one.

Created in 2013, the Master of Advanced Study in Global Affairs is a one-year program for mid-career professionals, which enrolls only a few students each year. The program is focused on those with at least seven years of professional experience in global affairs. The degree functions as a multi-disciplinary, rigorous academic program.

== Foundation and history ==
In April 2009, Yale announced it had received a US$50 million gift to create the Jackson Institute for Global Affairs. In the fall of 2010, the university officially opened the institute in Rosenkranz Hall. The donation came from ex-pharmaceutical businessman and philanthropist John Jackson, a 1967 graduate of Yale College, and his wife, Susan. Jackson said he originally intended to become a diplomat when entering Yale, like his great-grandfather. Regarding the gift, Jackson stated, "We hope to inspire students to pursue careers in diplomacy and public service and to become globally engaged leaders in all walks of life." Yale President Richard Levin added, "The Jackson Institute will become a signature program, marking Yale's global aspirations. Its teaching programs will permeate the University, expanding the curriculum in international affairs so that students in all its schools are better prepared for global leadership and service."

In 2010, shortly after the institute opened, Yale College faculty introduced the Global Affairs major, replacing the previous international studies major. While the international studies major could only be completed as a second major, the Global Affairs could be completed as a standalone major.

On April 6, 2019, Yale President Peter Salovey formally announced to the Yale community that the Jackson Institute would transform itself into the Yale Jackson School of Global Affairs by 2022. The announcement came after a decision by the Yale Corporation. This decision stemmed from a report of a committee chaired by Professor Judith Chevalier, William S. Beinecke Professor of Economics and Finance at the Yale School of Management, who recommended the formation of a school of global affairs in a report made public in November 2018.

== Programs and centers ==
As of 2024, the list includes:

- Maurice R. Greenberg World Fellows Program
- Blue Center for Global Strategic Assessment
- The Deitz Family Initiative on Environment and Global Affairs
- International Leadership Center
- Johnson Center for the Study of American Diplomacy
- Leitner Program on Effective Democratic Governance
- Peacebuilding initiative
- Schmidt Program on Artificial Intelligence, Emerging Technologies, and National Power
- Social Innovation Initiative

== See also ==
- Yale University
- MacMillan Center for International and Area Studies
- List of Ivy League public policy schools
