= John Addison Porter =

American physician and chemist (1822–1866)

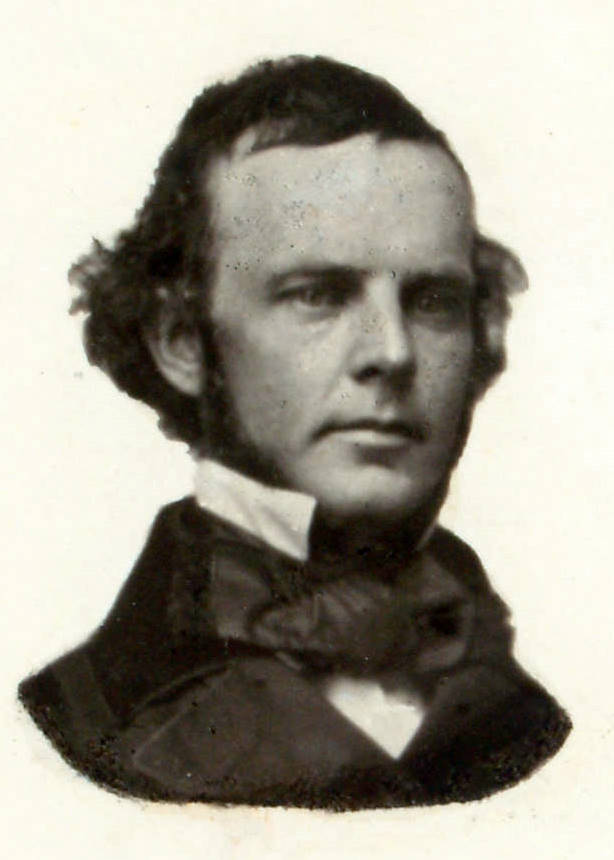
- Carbon print of John Addison Porter
- Born: March 15, 1822; Catskill, New York, United States
- Died: August 25, 1866 (aged 44); New Haven, Connecticut, United States
- Education: Yale College; University of Giessen
- Occupations: Professor, Physician
- Spouse: Josephine Earl Sheffield
- Children: John Addison Porter, Jr. Edgar Sheffield Porter
- Parent(s): Addison Porter; Anne Hogeboom
- Relatives: Joseph Earl Sheffield (father-in-law)

John Addison Porter (March 15, 1822 – August 25, 1866) was an American professor of chemistry and physician. He is the namesake of the John Addison Porter Prize and was a founder of the Scroll and Key senior society of Yale University.

== Academic life ==
Porter was born in Catskill, New York.

Porter graduated from Yale College in 1842. At Yale, he, along with William C. Kingsley, publisher of The New Englander, and eleven others, founded the senior or secret society Scroll and Key and incorporated the Kingsley Trust Association in 1841.

He and moved to Philadelphia for further study. In 1844 he became a professor at Delaware College and remained there until 1847 when he moved to Germany to study at the University of Giessen under Justus von Liebig.

In 1850 he returned to the United States and became a professor at Brown University. He left in 1852 to take the place of the retiring Professor John Pitkin Norton at Sheffield Scientific School (then Yale Scientific School). He was the Professor of Analytical and Agricultural Chemistry from 1852 to 1856, and Professor of Organic Chemistry from 1856 to 1864. He remained at Yale until he had to resign for health reasons in 1864, two years before his death in New Haven. In 1872 the Kingsley Trust endowed at Yale a prize in his honor to be given annually.

== Personal life ==
In 1855 he married Josephine Earl Sheffield, daughter of Joseph E. Sheffield, whose name was to eventually adorn the school where he was professor for 12 years.

One of their sons was another John Addison Porter, who became the first person to hold the title "Secretary to the President", when he served in that capacity to William McKinley.

== Works and achievements ==
=== Literary works ===
- First book of chemistry and allied sciences. 1857
- Principles of chemistry. 1857, 1860, 1864, 1868
- First book of science. 1858
- Outlines of the first course of Yale agricultural lectures. 1860
- Selections from the Kalevala, the Great Finnish Epic. 1868

Porter was the first person to translate any part of the Finnish national epic Kalevala into English using the German translation by Franz Anton Schiefner (the same version used by John Martin Crawford for his complete 1888 translation).

== John Addison Porter Prize ==
The John Addison Porter Prize, established in 1872, is a prize at Yale University awarded annually to the best work of scholarship in any field "where it is possible, through original effort, to gather and relate facts or principles, or both, and to present the results in such a literary form as to make the product of general human interest."
