= Agriculture in Connecticut =

Overview article

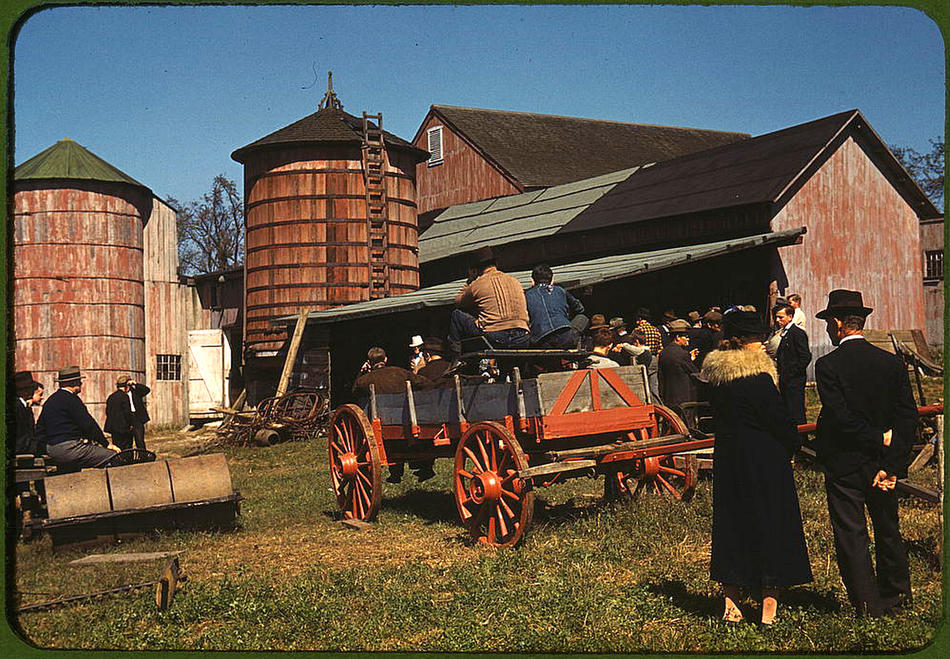
A farm auction in Derby, Connecticut, September 1940.

Agriculture played a major role in the early growth of Connecticut as one of the original 13 colonies that would form the United States of America, particularly in the Connecticut River valley which provides fertile soil, temperate climate and easy access to markets. As the Industrial Revolution helped focus capital on mercantile centers in the 19th century, Connecticut farmers over time ceded their relative economic and political influence.

In the 21st century, farming remains a relatively small but still significant industry in Connecticut, employing some 12,000 people as of 2010. Breaking a pattern of steady decline in the number of Connecticut farms, between 2002 and 2012 the number of Connecticut farms increased by 43%. A potential cause of this change in trend is increased consumer preference for locally sourced food, drawing some younger people to start up small farms. Connecticut had nearly 6,000 farms with 437,000 acres of land as of 2012, producing $551 million in revenue that year. In 2012, the total value of Connecticut farmland and buildings was $4.4 billion, down 3.5% from 2011.

Connecticut farms received $141 million in federal subsidies between 1995 and 2012, including commodity programs, conservation payments, crop insurance, and disaster aid, ranking it 45th of the 50 states.

== Agricultural policy ==
=== Connecticut Department of Agriculture ===
The Connecticut Department of Agriculture steers agricultural policy at the state level, with membership-based farm bureaus and other nonprofits contributing to policy direction. The department has several responsibilities: foster a healthy economic and environmental climate for farms; protect resources; enforce laws related to domestic animals; and promote the industry. The agency includes a commissioner's office; bureaus for regulation and inspection, aquaculture; and agricultural development and resource preservation; and an administrative arm overseeing a farmer's market in Hartford.

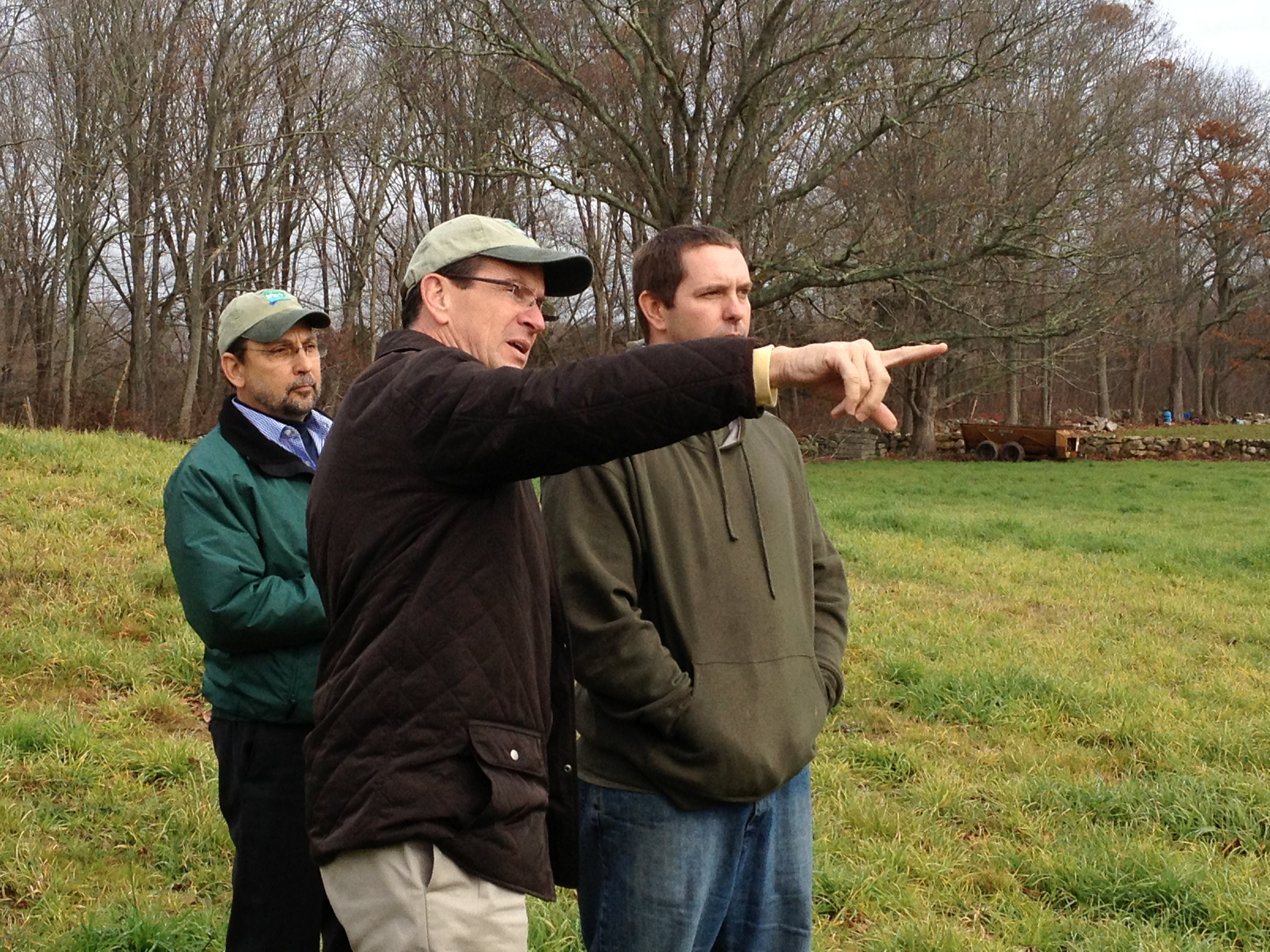
Steven Reviczky (left) and Connecticut Gov. Dannel Malloy (center) at White Oak Farms in Stonington in November 2012

In 2011, Governor Dannel Malloy appointed Steven Reviczky as commissioner of the Department of Agriculture, with Reviczky previously executive director of the nonprofit Connecticut Farm Bureau Association from 2006 to 2011. Reviczky chairs a Governor's Council for Agricultural Development charged with developing policies to encourage Connecticut residents to spend at least 5% of their food purchases on locally grown products by 2020. The state Department of Agriculture oversees several programs that provide direct funding for farms, including the:

- CT Grown Joint Venture Grant Program;
- Environmental Assistance Program;
- Farm Reinvestment Grant;
- Farm Transition Grant;
- Farm Viability Grant Program for Municipalities; and
- Specialty Crop Block Grant.

The state has also authorized one-time assistance programs, including the Production Loss Assistance Needed Today (PLANT) Grant program authorized in 2013 that provided funds for farmers impacted by storms and flooding. A state Bureau of Inspection and Regulation has oversight for a wide range of duties, including inspecting inputs like feed and fertilizer, as well as milk and produce produced for schools; animal control and health, including tracking West Nile virus and other communicable diseases; monitoring milk prices; and licensing agricultural and animal health facilities. The department publishes varying reports on the sector, including a weekly agricultural report; listings of farms; and guides to assist agricultural businesses, farmers markets and new farmers.

=== Land conservation ===
As the Connecticut economy expanded following World War II, developers accelerated purchases of farmland for conversion to residential and commercial developments. In 1978, the state established the Connecticut Farmland Preservation Program with the goal of protecting 130,000 acres of land from development, at least 85,000 of that amount as cropland. Under the Connecticut Farmland Preservation Program, farms sell their local government a conservation easement to their property, providing cash to the farm and control for the town to ensure the land can be withheld from future development. As of July 2019, under the direction of the state Department of Agriculture, the program has preserved more than 44,500 acres on 370 farms. The long-term goal is to preserve 130,000 acres.

In 1986, the state authorized a Joint State-Town Farmland Preservation Program to encourage municipalities to create their own preservation programs. The Connecticut Department of Energy and Environmental Protection administers the Connecticut Open Space and Watershed Land Acquisition Grants Program, established in 1998 to help towns, conservation groups and water companies protect land deemed important, including farmland.

Despite those efforts, over a five-year period between 1997 and 2002, Connecticut lost 12% of its farmland to development, the highest percentage of any state in the nation.

=== Taxation of agricultural enterprises ===
Under Connecticut Public Act 490, for the purposes of local property taxation farmland is assessed at use value rather than fair market value, with the law intended to protect farmers from higher taxes caused by escalating land values in Connecticut. Despite the law, farm property taxes across Connecticut rose 44% between 1997 and 2002, the second highest rate of increase in the Northeast over that period.

Under Connecticut law, farmers can claim exemptions from property taxes on machinery and equipment valued up to $100,000; temporary structures used in the agricultural process; livestock and produce; and in the case of aquaculture, vessels used for commercial fishing. Municipalities have the option of allowing a tax abatement of up to 50% for other farm property. Connecticut exempts several farm products from sales tax, including fruit, vegetables, eggs, maple syrup, honey, cakes and pies. Farms are also exempt from paying sales tax on goods they purchase or lease that are used exclusively in the agricultural production process.

== Agricultural products ==
In 1986, Connecticut created the Connecticut Grown Program to help farmers promote products to consumers who wish to buy locally. Other efforts to promote consumer awareness of local farms include a Farmers' Markets program; signage directing visitors to farms; a Farm-to-School program; a Farm-to-Chef program; crop seasonal availability calendars; and promotional boards focused on apples, milk, seafood and wine, among other products.

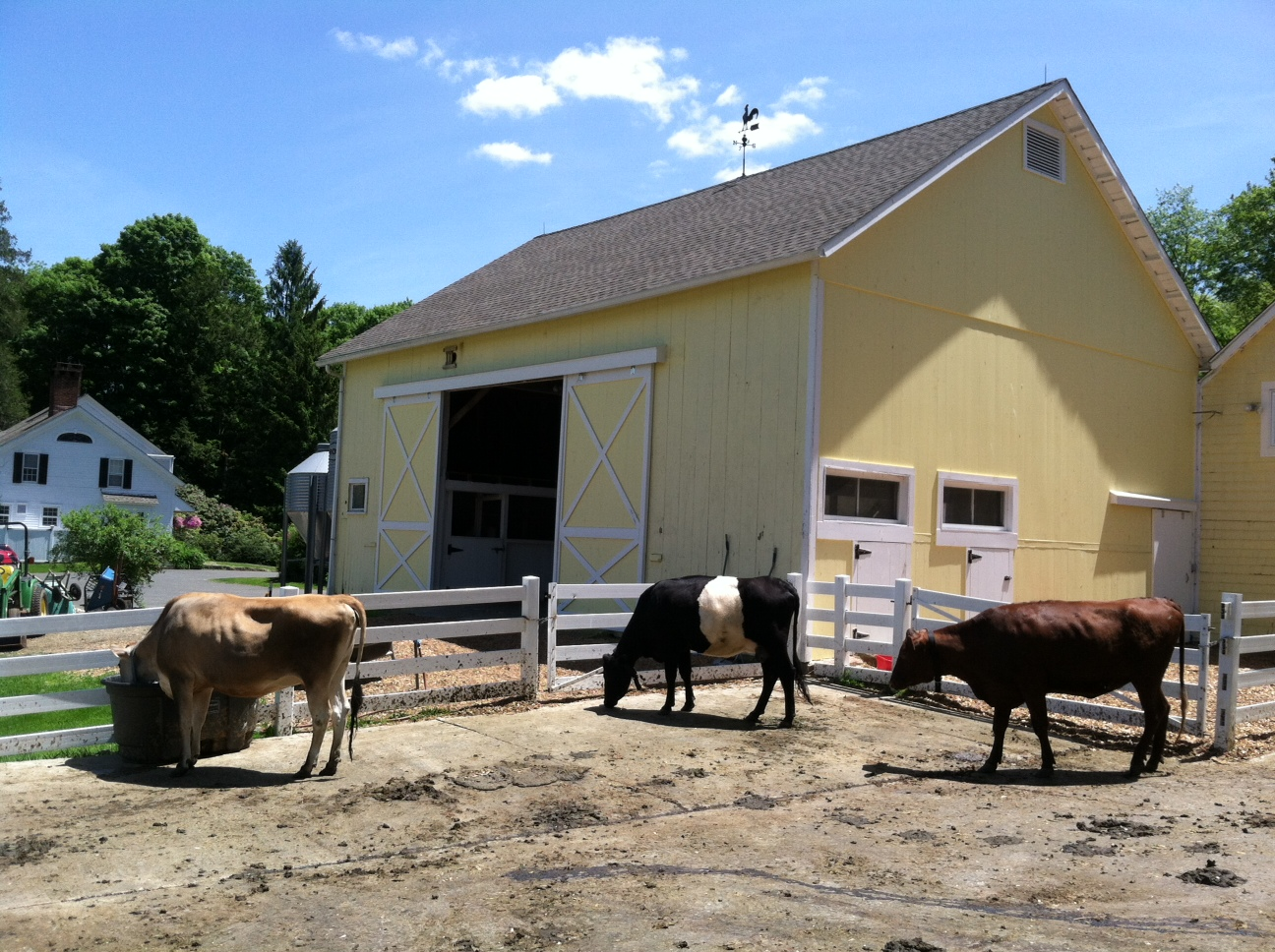
After horticulture, milk is the top agricultural product in Connecticut.

The top 15 agricultural products of Connecticut by value as of 2015:

1.	Nursery and horticulture	$252.9 million
2.	Milk	$69.8 million
3.	Poultry and eggs	$48.9 million
4.	Vegetables, melons, potatoes, and sweet potatoes	$36.4 million
5.	Tobacco	$35.7 million
6.	Fruits, nuts and berries	$27.3 million
7.	Aquaculture	$19.7 million
8.	Hay and other crops	$15.5 million
9.	Grains, beans and peas	$15.2 million
10.	Cattle	$9.8 million
11.	Horses	$8.1 million
12.	Christmas trees and greenery	$6 million
13.	Other animals	$6.2 million
14.	Sheep, goats, wool and milk	$1.4 million
15.	Pork	$1.3 million

Connecticut farmers increasingly are offering Community Supported Agriculture programs in which consumers purchase produce with an up-front payment for a full growing season.

As of 2007, Connecticut ranked first nationally in direct market sales at $27,000 per farm, with 22.4% of farms selling directly to markets, the second highest percentage in the nation.

== Agricultural research ==
The Connecticut Agricultural Experiment Station researches plants, pests, youth soil, and water. In addition to its main laboratory in New Haven, the Connecticut Agricultural Experiment Station operates outdoor laboratories at Lockwood Farm in Hamden; Valley Laboratory in Windsor; and Griswold Research Center in Griswold. Major breakthroughs by the Connecticut Agricultural Experiment Station include the development of a hybrid corn in 1918 that would have a major impact on world agriculture; creating the first organic fungicide to protect crops in 1940; and developing tests in 1984 to identify Lyme disease in the lab.

The University of Connecticut College of Agriculture, Health, and Natural Resources runs the Storrs Agricultural Experiment Station.

== Agritourism ==
Many Connecticut farms derive a portion of their revenue from tourists, with organizers having published a Connecticut Farm Map and trails highlighting wine, beer, and cheese producers; farmers markets; and historic barns. Between July and October, agricultural fairs occur throughout the state, and many producers attend the Eastern States Exposition, held annually in September in West Springfield, Massachusetts.

== Aquaculture ==
While the aquaculture industry nationally is monitored by the U.S. Department of Commerce, in Connecticut it is regulated by the state Department of Agriculture. In 2010, Connecticut's aquaculture industry produced 450,000 bushels of clams and 200,000 bushels of oysters, supporting about 300 jobs. As of 2010, the state leased 53,000 acres of waterbeds to aquaculture operators, and municipalities leased another 20,000 acres.

== History ==
=== 17th century ===
Before the arrival of European settlers, Native Americans farmed portions of Connecticut, growing corn, beans, and squash, among other plants; and tilling land using stone hoes, bones, turtle shells and wood. Native American tribes in New England are thought to have rotated crops, allowed land to lie fallow, and cleared land for cultivation using fire. Colonial settlers assimilated some practices of Native American farmers, particularly their reliance on corn as a crop; the use of fish and marine mud as a fertilizer; and their gathering of wild-growing "Indian rice", berries and hemp.

New settlers introduced their own practices such as clearing and plowing fields—using wooden plows sheathed with sheet iron or tin—and husbanding livestock to produce better yields. While the land that makes up modern day Connecticut was heavily forested, natural clearings suitable for cultivation were also available. Early farmers had to contend with predators representing a threat to livestock, including wolves, and relatively poor grass for dairy cattle that encouraged the breeding of hogs for meat. Over time, towns would develop village greens on quality pasture land to better feed and protect livestock.

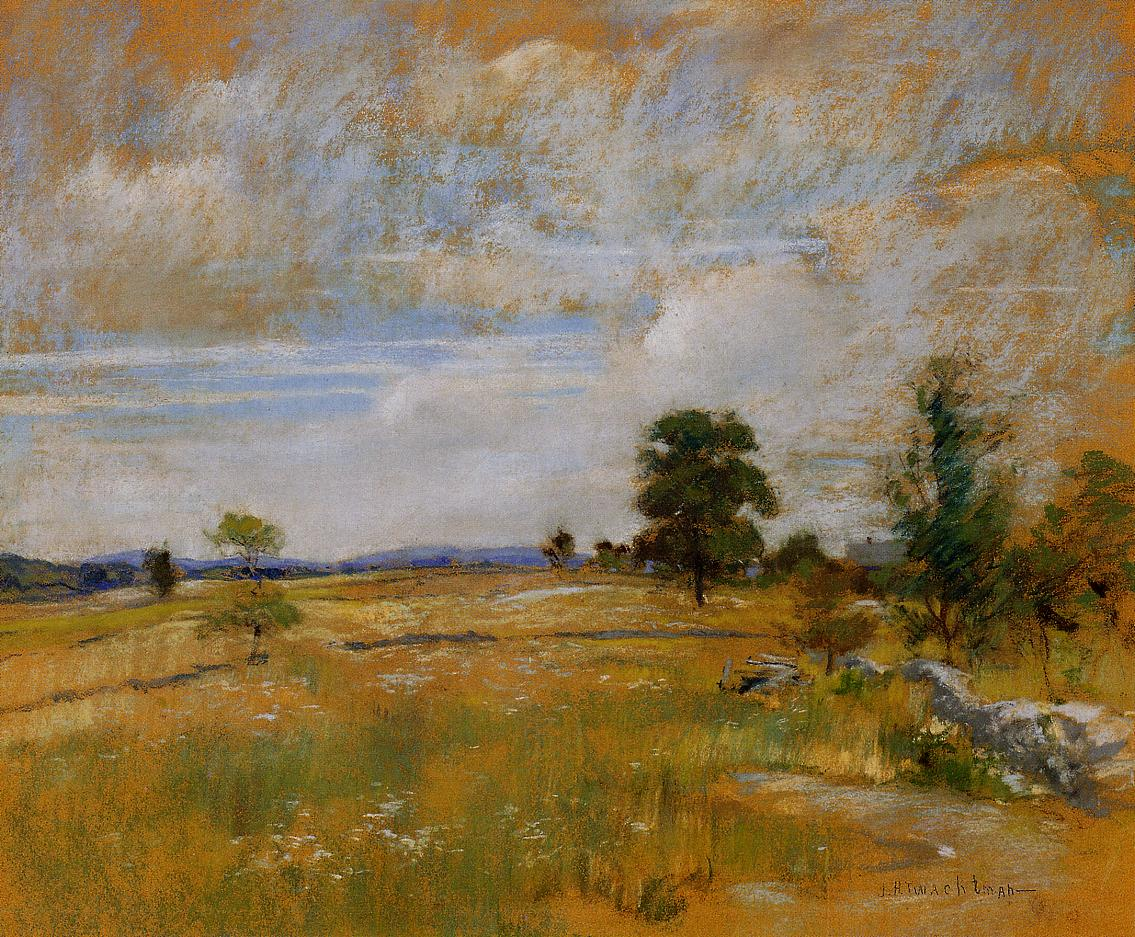
Connecticut's early settlers cleared land of trees and boulders, marking boundaries with stone walls not unlike the scene in John Twachtman's Connecticut Landscape.

As settlers organized townships along Long Island Sound and major rivers, some traded various articles to Native Americans for deeds to arable land in the interior sections of the state, leading to the establishment of new towns. The glaciers that formed Connecticut's ridges and river valleys left boulders in their wake, which farmers uprooted for use in stone walls demarcating boundaries.

Connecticut's produce increased in variety to include apples, barley, beets, carrots, cabbage, herbs, lettuce, oats, onions, parsnips, pears, peas, radishes, turnips, wheat and broadleaf tobacco. Crops were vulnerable to a range of threats, including birds, rodents, insects, flooding, drought and blight.

Farmers also enjoyed abundant years that resulted in gluts of corn and other crops, with Connecticut's early colonial government attempting without success varying mechanisms to maintain prices, including purchase pools that sought to eliminate middlemen.

Early Connecticut farmers exported beef and produce primarily to Boston, with smaller amounts shipped to Barbados, Jamaica and other Caribbean islands.

Settlers cultivated tobacco as early as 1640, despite some prohibitions on its use. By the 18th century most restrictions were no longer on the books, and tobacco exports grew. In 1784, Connecticut implemented measures in a bid to ensure that only the best quality tobacco was packaged for export, assigning inspectors and holding them accountable.

=== 18th century ===
Probate records show that during the 100-year period spanning 1670 to 1759, the median Connecticut farm's livestock holdings consisted of three horses, 13 cattle, 16 sheep and seven pigs. Irish settlers introduced potatoes in Connecticut in 1720, but colonial farmers would be slow to adopt the crop. Connecticut onion farmers had ample success exporting, both to neighboring colonies like New York as well as the Caribbean, with southwest Connecticut becoming a center of the industry. Farmers in some parts of Connecticut made maple syrup and sugar, and pressed apple cider including fermented varieties.

As Connecticut's maritime industry grew from trade and fisheries, demand grew for good quality hemp for the manufacture of cordage. In 1740, families were ordered to sow at least a handful of hempseed in an effort to boost stocks over coming years.

In 1734, Connecticut legislators created incentives for the development of a cottage silk industry, during a run-up in prices; by 1750, horticulturist Nathaniel Aspinwall was planting mulberry trees to support silkworms. Ezra Stiles, president of Yale College from 1778 to 1795, further promoted the planting of mulberry trees, creating a homegrown silk industry that lasted until the middle of the 19th century when blight destroyed mulberry plantations.

In 1750, Reverend Jared Elliot published what is thought to be the first advice book by a British colonist in North America on farming and husbandry, Essays Upon Field-Husbandry in New-England, as it is or may be Ordered. Among other items, the text addressed drainage, fertilizer, better plowing techniques and the advantages of smaller farms. In the livestock trade in the latter half of the 18th century, pork continued to be produced in sufficient quantities for export, but Connecticut also increased its sheep herds to the point where it produced twice as many as the next two colonies combined, with wool deemed better than other colonies though still not on par with English wool. In 1802, General David Humphreys imported Spanish merino sheep to his farm in Derby, greatly improving the breed in Connecticut; with British wool imports cut off in the early part of the 1800s, Connecticut's sheep herd grew quickly, to 400,000 animals by 1813. Cattle production improved with the increased practice of sowing grass seed and the introduction of clover, beginning around 1790.

=== 19th century ===
Despite limited success in exports, entering the 19th century Connecticut farmers generally adhered to a model of subsistence farming and barter, with poor roads hampering the transport of produce to market and Long Island and New Jersey farmers competing for trade with burgeoning New York City. By one estimate, settlers had cleared two-thirds of the Connecticut's available land.

That would change in the first half of the century, in part due to Connecticut's own metropolitan centers swelling in size, as well as improved machinery that enabled farmers to plant and harvest more crops, including the Hawkes Plow manufactured in Hartford beginning in the 1830s. The tobacco industry also saw its first significant growth in the first half of the 19th century, as farmers in the Connecticut River valley and later the Housatonic River valley found success with their leaves as cigar wrappers. By 1810, cigar and plug factories were established in East Windsor and Suffield. Farmers also sought to introduce better stocks of cattle, including Devonshires beginning in 1819; Ayrshires in 1822; Guernseys in 1830; Shorthorns in 1835; Jerseys in 1846; and Holsteins some time after 1860. From 85,000 milk cows in the state as of 1850, the herd would increase to 128,000 by the end of the century.

By the middle part of the century, Litchfield County had a booming cheese production business that produced an estimated 2.7 million pounds annually, with Lewis Norton creating the country's first cheese factory that relied on curd from other farms in addition to his own cows. In 1857, Gail Borden would establish a condensed milk manufacturing company that would evolve into Borden. In 1871, the Farmington Creamery was organized as a joint stock company to churn out butter, but after a brief spurt of growth competition from western creameries and the introduction of butter substitutes would stifle butter production in Connecticut by the end of the century.

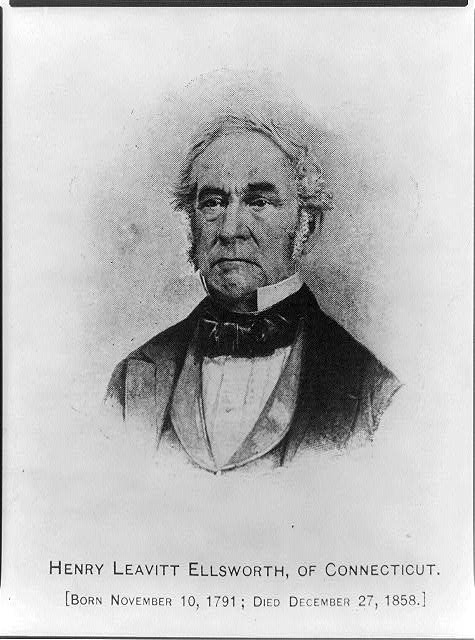
Henry Leavitt Ellsworth, deemed the father of the U.S. Department of Agriculture

Agricultural advances were occurring throughout the states, particularly in the south and west, and with Connecticut's soil comparatively poor, the state's farmers increasingly focused on producing perishable goods for nearby populations that would not be subject to competing products from other faraway locales. Increasingly, farmers in various parts of the state focused on a few cash crops that proved successful for export. Apple and peach orchards were blossoming by the middle of the century, but would be subject to the vagaries of pests, weather, and competitors in other states.

Farmers also began to organize in associations and later granges in order to share ideas and coordinate in getting produce to markets, and to organize fairs. As early as 1794, a Society for Promoting Agriculture in the State of Connecticut was formed, renamed in 1818 the Agricultural Society of New Haven. A similar group was started in Hartford in 1817 and in other counties of the state between 1839 and 1854. The organization extended to the town level, as farmers' clubs sprouted locally starting in Middletown in 1842.

In 1839 as head of the U.S. Patent Office, Hartford resident Henry Leavitt Ellsworth secured the first Congressional appropriation in support of agriculture and established a bureau supporting the industry. Leavitt is regarded as the father of the U.S. Department of Agriculture, which was created in 1862 four years after his death.

In 1845, the Cream Hill Agricultural School was founded in West Cornwall in Litchfield County, with a farm totaling 200 acres. The school touted its access to New York City on the Housatonic Railroad. Tuition was $200 a year for the some 22 students that attended annually on average. The school closed in 1869.

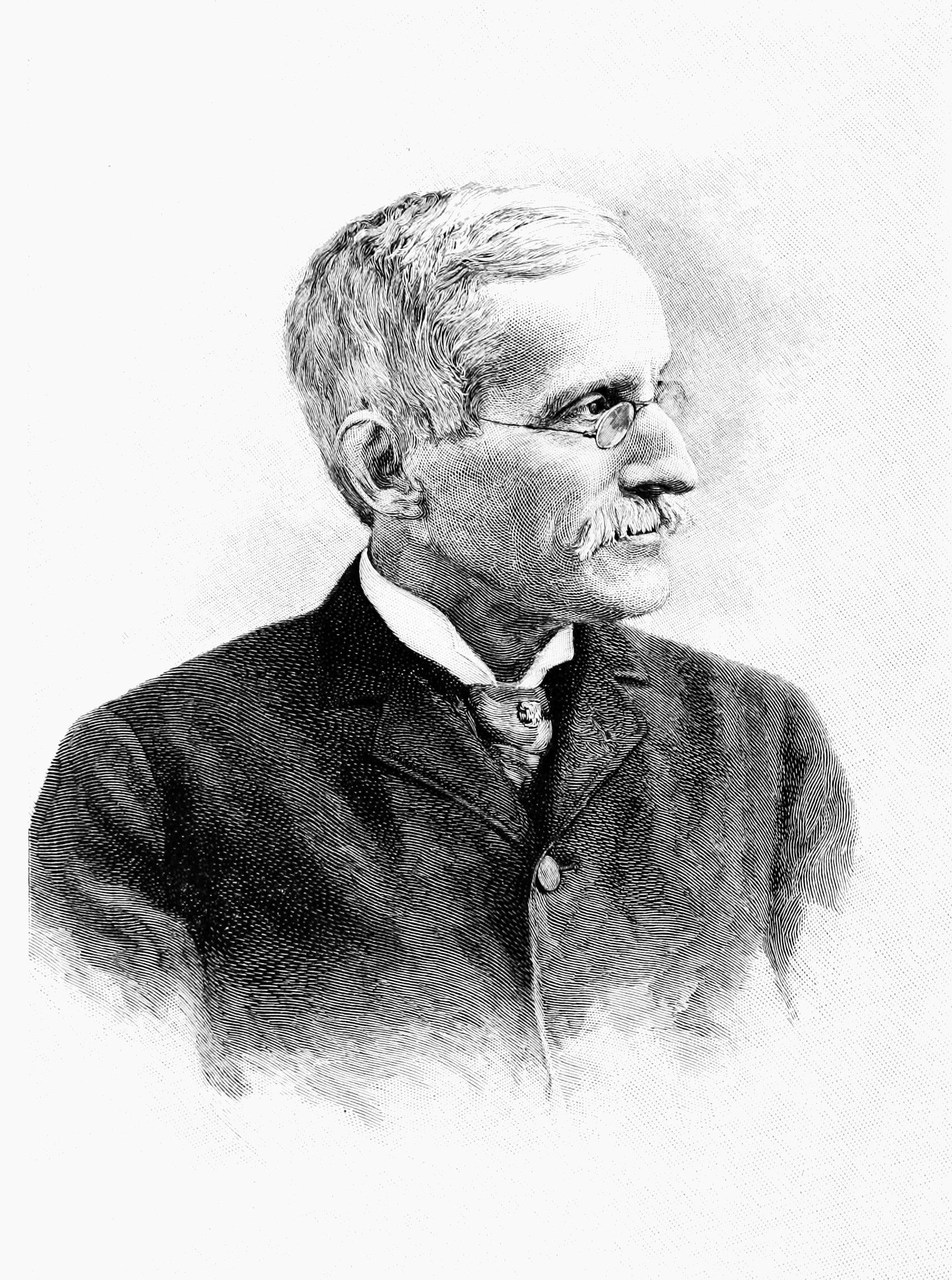
Samuel William Johnson, credited with helping spur the funding for land-grant universities in the United States, as well as agricultural experiment stations.

In 1846, John Norton and Benjamin Silliman opened a laboratory at Yale focused on scientific applications in agriculture. Norton would publish in 1850 Elements of Scientific Agriculture, only to die two years later of tuberculosis. Norton's protege Samuel William Johnson would become a leading expert in agricultural education, organizing a national conference that contributed to the Morrill Land-Grant Colleges Act of 1862 that awarded states 30,000 acres of federal land to help fund the creation of agricultural and mechanical colleges. Johnson has been dubbed "the father of the agricultural experiment station" in the United States, Theodore Gold helped spearhead the 1853 formation of the Connecticut Agricultural Society, as well as the Connecticut Board of Agriculture that would follow in 1866. Created by the Connecticut General Assembly, the Board of Agriculture included the governor and a representative appointed by each county's agricultural society, giving the board wide latitude to pursue an agenda to benefit farming. The Board of Agriculture would serve as a springboard for the 1875 creation of the Connecticut Agricultural Experiment Station at Wesleyan University in Middletown, the first in the nation; and the Storrs Agricultural School, which would serve as the foundation for the University of Connecticut. With the 1887 passage of the Hatch Act, Congress created a national system of agricultural experiment stations.

In 1867, organizers formed the National Grange of Patrons of Husbandry in Washington, D.C., with a Connecticut state grange formed April 15, 1875. By 1892 Connecticut granges would have some 10,000 members.

In 1881, Charles and Augustus Storrs donated 180 acres of land in Mansfield for the creation of the Storrs Agricultural School, the site previously having housed orphans who lost parents in the Civil War. T. S. Gold, the state's secretary of the board of agriculture, had helped found the orphanage and served as a booster and trustee for Storrs Agricultural School for many years.

While Yale was initially the beneficiary of funds raised from the sale of land under the Morrill Act, in 1893 the Connecticut General Assembly transferred federal moneys to the Storrs school, which in 1889 changed its name again to the Connecticut Agricultural College.

=== 20th century ===
In 1900, 46 percent of Connecticut's population had a hand in the agriculture business.

With passage of the Smith-Lever Act in May 1914, federal funding was established for the creation and support of agricultural extension institutions nationally, connected with the land-grant universities created under the Morrill Act, with the goal of providing instruction and improving farming methods.

In 1912, A.J. Brundage created the Mansfield Corn Club, considered a precursor the emergence of 4-H youth development programs across the nation.work undertaken across the state and nation.

In 1917, Donald Jones revolutionized maize production in developing a hybrid seed corn. By 1963, it was estimated that Jones' discovery had increased the national wealth by 10%.

In 1925, the Connecticut Department of Agriculture replaced the longstanding state Board of Agriculture.

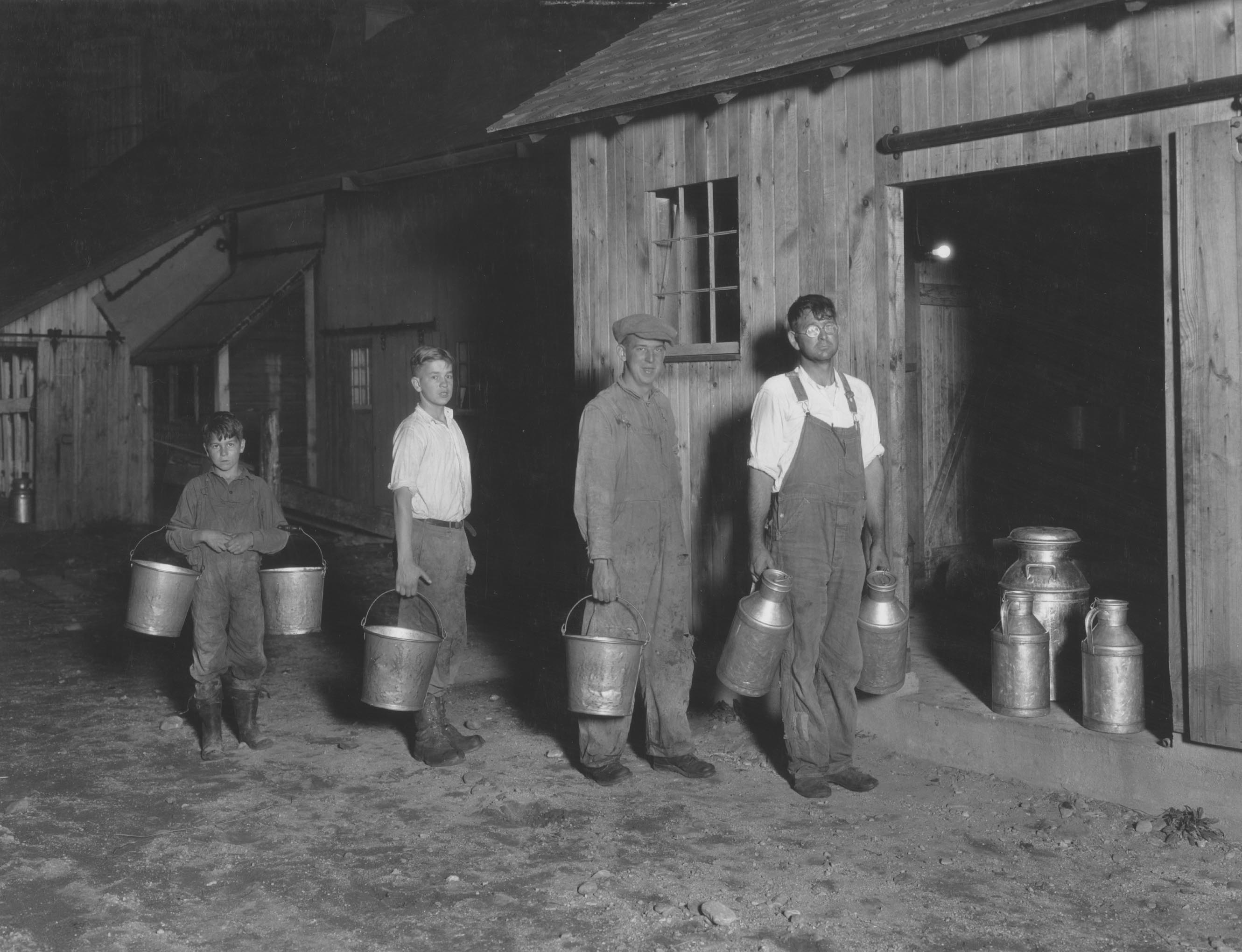
A New London County family readies for milking in 1928

New techniques promulgated by the Connecticut Agricultural Experiment Station were already seeing widespread adoption, including the cultivation of shade tobacco, so named for the tents erected over them to protect them from direct sunlight. After Indonesian farmers began to export tobacco wrappers with thinner leaves than U.S. varieties, Connecticut botanist W.C. Sturgis successfully reproduced the thinner leaf in what would come to be known as shade tobacco. After successive seasons of wet weather that dampened prospects for cultivation, by 1910 hundreds of Connecticut farmers were growing shade tobacco.

In 1922, farmers formed the Connecticut Valley Tobacco Association, with members pledging to sell their entire crop to the association which would then warehouse it in an attempt to better control prices.

By the middle of the 20th century, 16,000 acres of shade tobacco were under cultivation, with fields tended by laborers from the south and the Caribbean who worked long hours for little pay.

Connecticut farmers suffered severe drought conditions between August 1964 and November 1967. While some harvests of higher-value crops like shade tobacco were saved due to irrigation, in Fairfield County some 125 dairy farms lost 80% of their pasture grass, with wells on 30% of those farms failing by November that year. Statewide, pasture and hay yields were down 40% for dairy farmers.

== Major farms ==
Connecticut has several large farms, including Kofkoff Egg Farms in Bozrah, which as of 2014 maintained 4.7 million chickens, employed some 300 people and produced $12 million in revenue for its most recent fiscal year. Major dairy producers include Laurel Brook Farm in North Canaan, which owns 2,500 acres for dairy production; and Fairvue Farm in Woodstock, which has a herd of 1,600 cows. Large produce operations include Baggott's Family Farms in East Windsor, which cultivates more than 2,000 acres of corn, perennials and other products.

== Pests ==
The Japanese beetle (Popillia japonica) is an invasive pest in most of the continent, and is especially severe here.
