= CAES =

CAES or C.A.E.S. may refer to:

- Compressed-air energy storage
- MIT Center of Advanced Engineering Study, a department of Massachusetts Institute of Technology
- Connecticut Agricultural Experiment Station
