= Food energy =

Chemical energy animals derive from food

Food energy is chemical energy that animals derive from food to sustain their metabolism and muscular activity. This is usually measured in calories or joules.

Most animals derive most of their energy from aerobic respiration, namely combining the carbohydrates, fats, and proteins with oxygen from air or dissolved in water. Other smaller components of the diet, such as organic acids, polyols, and ethanol (drinking alcohol) may contribute to the energy input. Some diet components that provide little or no food energy, such as water, minerals, vitamins, cholesterol, and fiber, may still be necessary for health and survival for other reasons. Some organisms have instead anaerobic respiration, which extracts energy from food by reactions that do not require oxygen.

The energy content of a given mass of food is usually expressed in the metric (SI) unit of energy, the joule (J), and its multiple the kilojoule (kJ); or in the traditional unit of heat energy, the calorie (cal). In nutritional contexts, the latter is often (especially in US) the "large" variant of the unit, also written "Calorie" (with symbol Cal, both with capital "C") or "kilocalorie" (kcal), and equivalent to 4184 J or 4.184 kJ. Thus, for example, fats and ethanol have the greatest amount of food energy per unit mass, 37 and 29 kJ/g (9 and 7 kcal/g), respectively. Proteins and most carbohydrates have about 17 kJ/g (4 kcal/g), though there are differences between different kinds. For example, the values for glucose, sucrose, and starch are 15.57, 16.48 and 17.48 kilojoules per gram (3.72, 3.94 and 4.18 kcal/g) respectively. The differing energy density of foods (fat, alcohols, carbohydrates and proteins) lies mainly in their varying proportions of carbon, hydrogen, and oxygen atoms. Carbohydrates that are not easily absorbed, such as fibre, or lactose in lactose-intolerant individuals, contribute less food energy. Polyols (including sugar alcohols) and organic acids contribute 10 kJ/g (2.4 kcal/g) and 13 kJ/g (3.1 kcal/g) respectively.

The energy contents of a food or meal can be approximated by adding the energy contents of its components, though the entire amount of calories calculated may not be absorbed during digestion.

== History and methods of measurement ==
=== Direct calorimetry of combustion ===
The first determinations of the energy content of food were made by burning a dried sample in a bomb calorimeter and measuring the temperature change in the water surrounding the apparatus, a method known as direct calorimetry.

=== The Atwater system ===
However, the direct calorimetric method generally overestimates the actual energy that the body can obtain from the food, because it also counts the energy contents of dietary fiber and other indigestible components, and does not allow for partial absorption and/or incomplete metabolism of certain substances. For this reason, today the energy content of food is instead obtained indirectly, by using chemical analysis to determine the amount of each digestible dietary component (such as protein, carbohydrates, and fats), and adding the respective food energy contents, previously obtained by measurement of metabolic heat released by the body. In particular, the fibre content is excluded. This method is known as the Modified Atwater system, after Wilbur Atwater who pioneered these measurements in the late 19th century.

The system was later improved by Annabel Merrill and Bernice Watt of the USDA, who derived a system whereby specific calorie conversion factors for different foods were proposed.

== Dietary sources of energy ==
The typical human diet consists chiefly of carbohydrates, fats, proteins, water, ethanol, and indigestible components such as bones, seeds, and fibre (mostly cellulose). Carbohydrates, fats, and proteins typically comprise ninety percent of the dry weight of food. Ruminants can extract food energy from the respiration of cellulose because of bacteria in their rumens that decompose it into digestible carbohydrates.

Other minor components of the human diet that contribute to its energy content are organic acids such as citric and tartaric, and polyols such as glycerol, xylitol, inositol, and sorbitol.

Some nutrients have regulatory roles affected by cell signaling, in addition to providing energy for the body. For example, leucine plays an important role in the regulation of protein metabolism and suppresses an individual's appetite. Small amounts of essential fatty acids, constituents of some fats that cannot be synthesized by the human body, are used (and necessary) for other biochemical processes.

The approximate food energy contents of various human diet components, to be used in package labeling according to the EU regulations and UK regulations, are:

Food component	Energy density	
Food component	kJ/g	kcal/g
Fat	37	9
Ethanol	29	7
Proteins	17	4
Carbohydrates	17	4
Organic acids	13	3
Polyols (sugar alcohols, sweeteners) (1)	10	2.4
Fiber (2)	8	2

(1) Some polyols, like erythritol, are not digested and should be excluded from the count.

(2) This entry exists in the EU regulations of 2008, but not in the UK regulations, according to which fibre shall not be counted.

More detailed tables for specific foods have been published by many organizations, such as the United Nations Food and Agriculture Organization also has published a similar table.

Other components of the human diet are either noncaloric, or are usually consumed in such small amounts that they can be neglected.

== Energy usage in the human body ==
The food energy actually obtained by respiration is used by the human body for a wide range of purposes, including basal metabolism of various organs and tissues, maintaining the internal body temperature, and exerting muscular force to maintain posture and produce motion. About 20% is used for brain metabolism.

The conversion efficiency of energy from respiration into muscular (physical) power depends on the type of food and on the type of physical energy usage (e.g., which muscles are used, whether the muscle is used aerobically or anaerobically). In general, the efficiency of muscles is rather low: only 18 to 26% of the energy available from respiration is converted into mechanical energy. This low efficiency is the result of about 40% efficiency of generating ATP from the respiration of food, losses in converting energy from ATP into mechanical work inside the muscle, and mechanical losses inside the body. The latter two losses are dependent on the type of exercise and the type of muscle fibers being used (fast-twitch or slow-twitch). For an overall efficiency of 20%, one watt of mechanical power is equivalent to 18 kJ/h (4.3 kcal/h). For example, a manufacturer of rowing equipment shows calories released from "burning" food as four times the actual mechanical work, plus 1,300 kJ (300 kcal) per hour, which amounts to about 20% efficiency at 250 watts of mechanical output. It can take up to 20 hours of little physical output (e.g., walking) to "burn off" 17,000 kJ (4,000 kcal) more than a body would otherwise consume. For reference, each kilogram of body fat is roughly equivalent to 32,300 kilojoules of food energy (i.e., 3,500 kilocalories per pound or 7,700 kilocalories per kilogram).

== Recommended daily intake ==
Many countries and health organizations have published recommendations for healthy levels of daily intake of food energy. For example, the United States government estimates 8,400 and 10,900 kJ (2,000 and 2,600 kcal) needed for women and men, respectively, between ages 26 and 45, whose total physical activity is equivalent to walking around 2.5 to 5 km (1 1/2 to 3 mi) per day in addition to the activities of sedentary living. These estimates are for a "reference woman" who is 1.63 m (5 ft 4 in) tall and weighs 57 kg (126 lb) and a "reference man" who is 1.78 m (5 ft 10 in) tall and weighs 70 kg (154 lb). Because caloric requirements vary by height, activity, age, pregnancy status, and other factors, the USDA created the DRI Calculator for Healthcare Professionals in order to determine individual caloric needs.

According to the Food and Agriculture Organization of the United Nations, the average minimum energy requirement per person per day is about 7,500 kJ (1,800 kcal). Although the U.S. has changed over time with a growth in population and processed foods or food in general, Americans today have available roughly the same level of calories as the older generation.

Older people and those with sedentary lifestyles require less energy; children and physically active people require more. Recognizing these factors, Australia's National Health and Medical Research Council recommends different daily energy intakes for each age and gender group. Notwithstanding, nutrition labels on Australian food products typically recommend the average daily energy intake of 8,800 kJ (2,100 kcal).

The minimum food energy intake is also higher in cold environments. Increased mental activity has been linked with moderately increased brain energy consumption.

== Nutrition labels ==
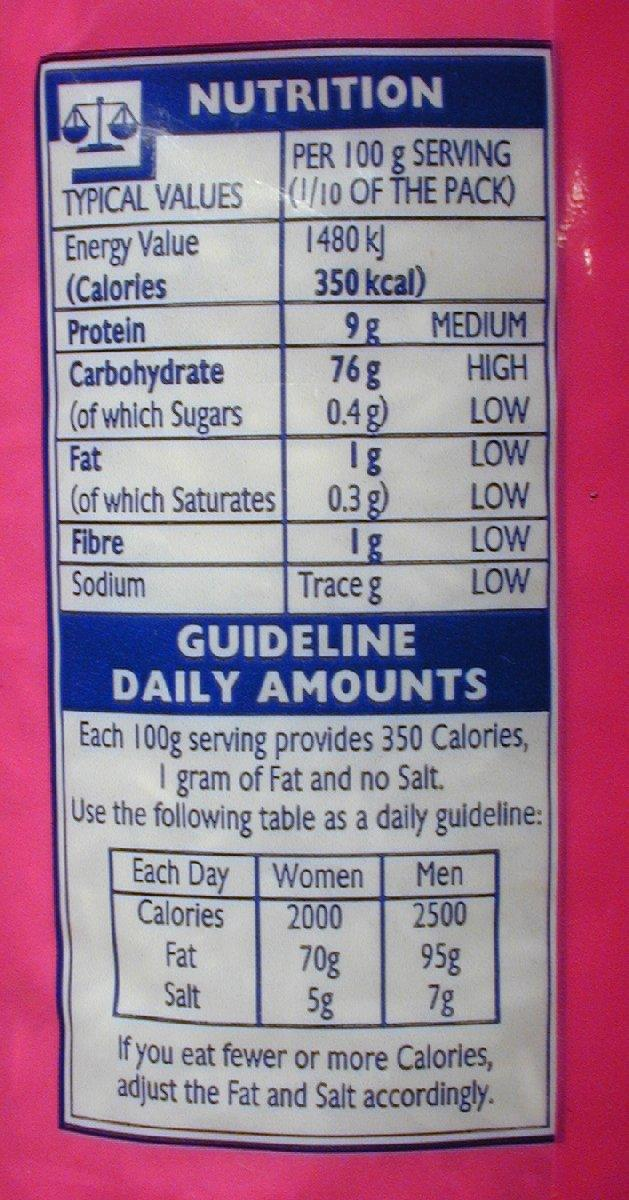
The nutritional information label on a pack of Basmati rice in the United Kingdom

Many governments require food manufacturers to label the energy content of their products to help consumers control their energy intake. To facilitate evaluation by consumers, food energy values (and other nutritional properties) in package labels or tables are often quoted for convenient amounts of the food, rather than per gram or kilogram; such as in "calories per serving" or "kcal per 100 g", or "kJ per package". The units vary depending on country:

Country	Mandatory unit (symbol)	Second unit (symbol)	Common usage
United States	Calorie (Cal)	kilojoule (kJ), optional	calorie (cal)
Canada	Calorie (Cal)	kilojoule (kJ), optional	calorie (cal)
Australia and New Zealand	kilojoule (kJ)	kilocalorie (kcal), optional	AU: kilocalorie (kcal)
United Kingdom	kJ	kcal, mandatory	
European Union	kilojoule (kJ)	kilocalorie (kcal), mandatory	
Brazil	caloria or quilocaloria (kcal)		caloria

== See also ==
- Basal metabolic rate
- Food chain
- Food composition
- Heat of combustion
- Nutrition facts label
- Satiety value
- Table of food nutrients
- List of countries by food energy intake
