= Edward Hopkins Jenkins =

American agricultural chemist

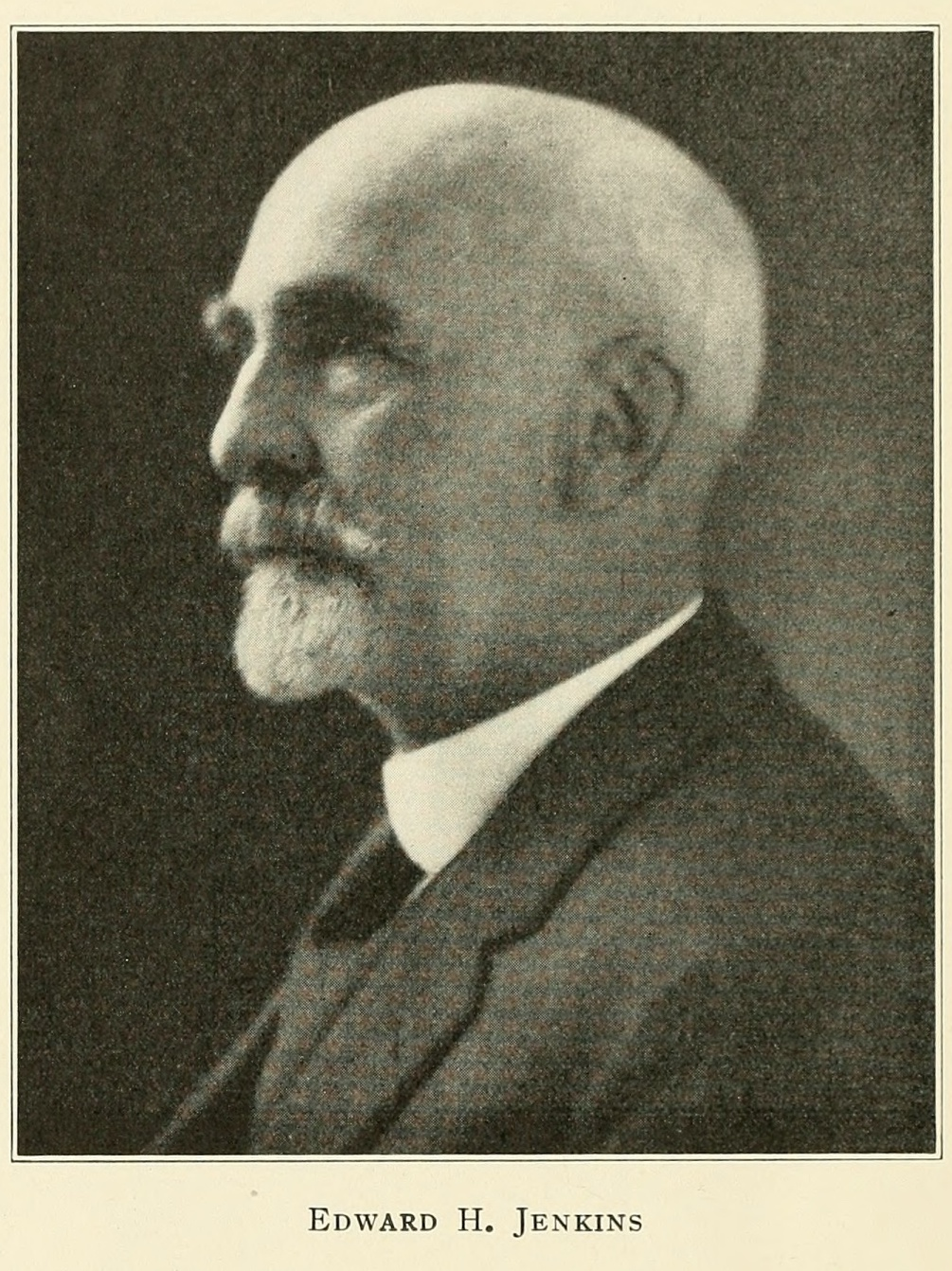
- Born: May 31, 1850; Falmouth, Massachusetts, US
- Died: November 6, 1931 (aged 81); New Haven, Connecticut, US
- Other names: E. H. Jenkins; Edward H. Jenkins
- Education: Yale University (BS, PhD)
- Known for: Tobacco cultivation
- Scientific career
- Fields: Agricultural chemistry
- Workplaces: Connecticut Agricultural Experiment Station

Edward Hopkins Jenkins (May 31, 1850 – November 6, 1931) was an American agricultural chemist who served as director of the Connecticut Agricultural Experiment Station from 1900 to 1923. He also directed the Storrs Agricultural Experiment Station from 1912 to 1923. Jenkins oversaw the writing of hundreds of agricultural publications during his tenure, specializing in the culture, cure, and fermentation of tobacco.

== Early life and education ==
Born in Falmouth, Massachusetts, to John and Chloe (Thompson) Jenkins, Jenkins graduated Phillips Academy in 1868 and earned his Bachelor of Arts (A.B.) degree from Yale College in 1872. He pursued graduate studies at Yale's Sheffield Scientific School under the tutelage of noted agricultural chemist Samuel William Johnson. From 1875 to 1876, Jenkins studied in Germany at Leipzig University and then at the Royal Saxon Academy of Agriculture and Forestry in Tharandt, Saxony under Friedrich Nobbe. He received his Doctor of Philosophy (PhD) in chemistry from Yale in 1879.

== Career ==
While studying for his doctorate, Jenkins began working as an assistant chemist for the Connecticut Agricultural Experiment Station in New Haven in 1877, only two years after the Station started. Johnson was the Station's director, while Jenkins and future Storrs Agricultural School principal Henry P. Armsby were his assistants. Jenkins rapidly developed a reputation for both scientific excellence and ability to convince skeptical farmers to adopt new agricultural techniques. He was promoted to vice director of the Station in 1884 and became director in 1900 (when Johnson retired) and treasurer in 1901. Jenkins simultaneously served as director and treasurer until retiring in 1923, when he became director emeritus until his death. The Station grew during his tenure, adding departments of entomology, forestry, genetics, and tobacco, the latter substation being in Windsor.

Jenkins held many other state offices. In 1883, he became an officer of the state board of agriculture. In 1899, he joined the board of trustees of the Connecticut Agricultural College. He served as director of the Storrs Agricultural Experiment Station from 1912 until 1923 and chaired the Connecticut Sewerage Commission from 1897 to 1903. During World War I, he served as state food administrator, leading Connecticut's efforts to ration supplies and maximize production of foodstuffs needed for the war effort. He wrote or oversaw the composition of hundreds of agricultural reports, bulletins, and other publications, including A History of Connecticut Agriculture (1925). Dedicated in October 1932 at a ceremony presided over by Governor Wilbur Cross, the Jenkins Laboratory of the Connecticut Agricultural Experiment Station was named in his honor. Renovated and expanded in 2014, the facility was renamed the Jenkins-Waggoner Laboratory after Paul E. Waggoner (Station director, 1972–1987).

== Service ==
In addition to his services to the State of Connecticut, Jenkins was active in professional associations throughout his life. A founding member of the Association of Official Agricultural Chemists, he served as its first president in 1887. He was a member of its Committee on Uniform Fertilizer Laws in 1888 and the Committee on Food Standards for many years, beginning in 1897. He served as president of the Association of American Agricultural Colleges and Experiment Stations (1912–1913) and served on the association's committees on nomenclature, uniform fertilizer laws, and seed testing. Jenkins was a member of the Connecticut Forest and Park Association, a member of the Society for the Promotion of Agricultural Science, and a fellow of the American Association for the Advancement of Science. He served on the board of governors of the New Haven Hospital for 20 years and served as president of the Graduate Club of New Haven from 1900 to 1905.

== Personal life ==
In 1885, Jenkins married Elizabeth Elliot Foote of Guilford, Connecticut, who survived him. The couple had no issue. Jenkins died in New Haven on November 6, 1931, at the age of 81.
