= Jason C. White =

American environmental scientist

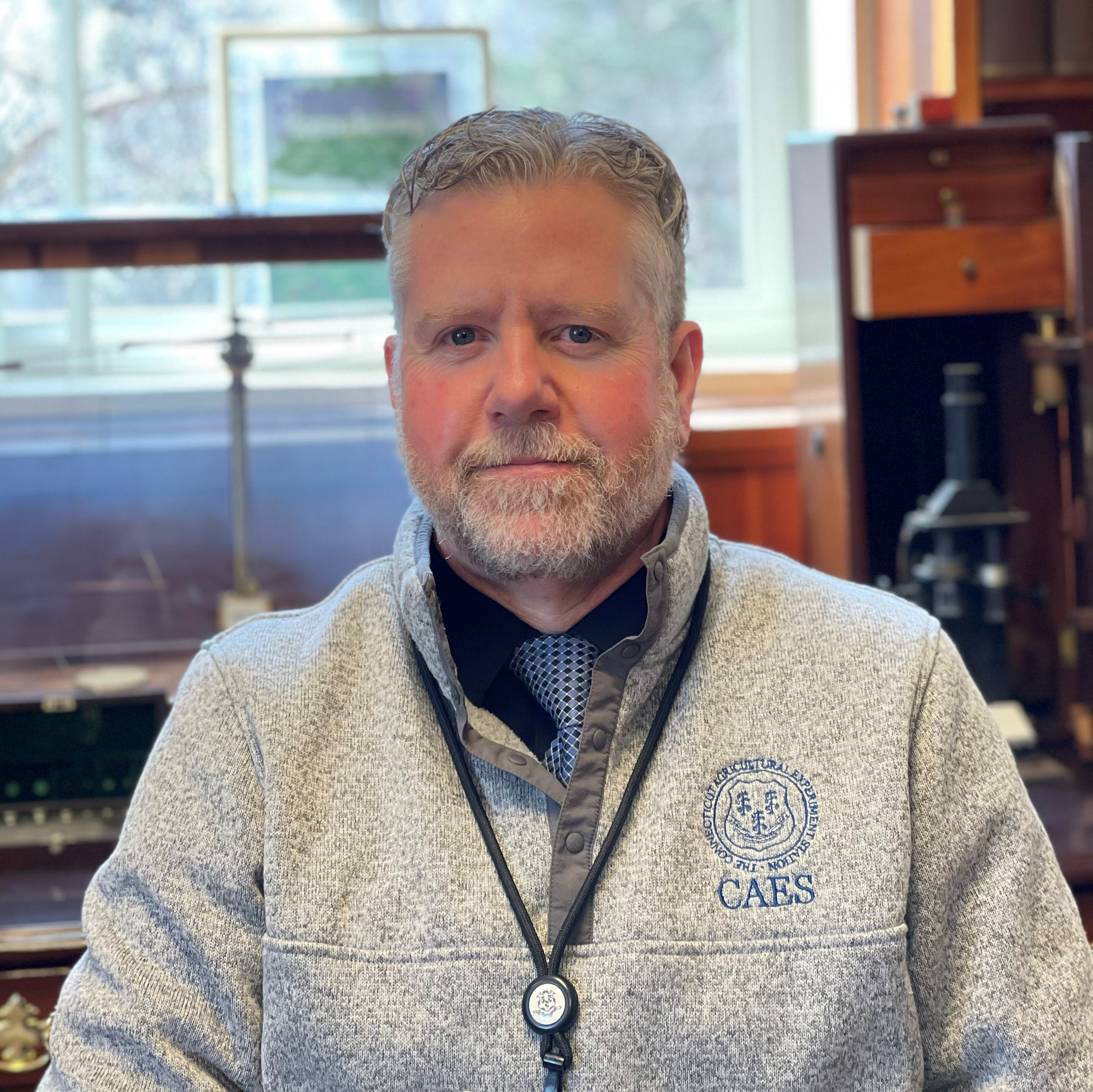

Director of the Connecticut Agricultural Experiment Station
- In office 2020–Incumbent
- Preceded by: Theodore Andreadis

Personal details
- Occupation: Environmental scientist

Academic background
- Education: B.S. in Environmental Science, Juniata College; M.S. in Environmental Toxicology, Cornell University; Ph.D. in Environmental Toxicology, Cornell University, 1997

Academic work
- Discipline: Environmental chemistry
- Sub-discipline: Nanotechnology; Environmental toxicology
- Institutions: Connecticut Agricultural Experiment Station

Jason C. White is an American environmental scientist and academic administrator. He is the director of the Connecticut Agricultural Experiment Station (CAES). His research focuses on environmental chemistry, nanotechnology in agriculture, and the fate and effects of contaminants in soil–plant systems. He is editor-in-chief of the International Journal of Phytoremediation and co-editor-in-chief of Environmental and Geochemical Processes.

== Education ==
White received a B.S. in environmental science from Juniata College in 1992. He earned an M.S. in environmental toxicology from Cornell University in 1995 and a Ph.D. in the same field from Cornell in 1997. After completing his doctorate, he joined the research staff of the Connecticut Agricultural Experiment Station in 1997.

== Career ==
White spent over two decades at the Connecticut Agricultural Experiment Station (CAES), serving as an assistant and associate scientist from 1998 to 2007, and later as chief analytical chemist from 2009 to 2020. He also served as vice director from 2013 to 2020. In 2020, White was named director of CAES. In this role, he oversees the institution's research programs, regulatory activities, and public outreach in areas including plant pathology, entomology, and environmental sciences.

In addition to his work at CAES, White has held several academic appointments. He has served as a clinical professor of epidemiology at the Yale School of Public Health since 2021 and as a gratis professor at the University of Connecticut since 2025. He has also been an adjunct faculty member at the University of Massachusetts since 2015 and at Post University since 2011.

White has served as a Commissioned Official of the United States Food and Drug Administration since 2020. He has also been a member of the European Science Foundation College of Experts.

White is editor-in-chief of the International Journal of Phytoremediation and co-editor-in-chief of Environmental and Geochemical Processes.

== Honors and awards ==
- 2011 – Environmental Science & Technology “Super Reviewer” Award
- 2016; 2018–2021 – Environmental Science: Nano Outstanding Reviewer Award
- 2020 – Environmental Science & Technology Lifetime Reviewer Award (inaugural recipient)
- 2020–2024 – Clarivate Web of Science Highly Cited Researcher
- 2021 – Elected Member, Connecticut Academy of Science and Engineering
- 2025 – Elected Honorary Fellow, Global Academy of Nanotechnology
