= Atwater system =

System for the calculation of the available energy of foods

The Atwater system, named after Wilbur Olin Atwater, or derivatives of this system are used for the calculation of the available energy of foods. The system was developed largely from the experimental studies of Atwater and his colleagues in the later part of the 19th century and the early years of the 20th at Wesleyan University in Middletown, Connecticut. Its use has frequently been the cause of dispute, but few alternatives have been proposed. As with the calculation of protein from total nitrogen, the Atwater system is a convention and its limitations can be seen in its derivation.

== Derivation ==
Available energy (as used by Atwater) is equivalent to the modern usage of the term metabolisable energy (ME).

$${\text{Metabolisable Energy}} = \left(\text{Gross Energy in Food}\right) - \left(\text{Energy lost in Faeces, Urine, Secretions and Gases}\right).$$

In most studies on humans, losses in secretions and gases are ignored. The gross energy (GE) of a food, as measured by bomb calorimetry is equal to the sum of the heats of combustion of the components – protein (GE_{p}), fat (GE_{f}) and carbohydrate (GE_{cho}) (by difference) in the proximate system.

$${GE} = {{GE}_\mathrm{p} + {GE}_\mathrm{f} + {GE}_\mathrm{cho}}.$$

Atwater considered the energy value of feces in the same way.

$${GE}^\mathrm{F} = {{GE}_\mathrm{p}^\mathrm{F} + {GE}_\mathrm{f}^\mathrm{F} + {GE}_\mathrm{cho}^\mathrm{F}}.$$

By measuring coefficients of availability or in modern terminology apparent digestibility, Atwater derived a system for calculating faecal energy losses.

$$\text{Digestible energy} = {{GE}_\mathrm{p}(D_\mathrm{p})} + {{GE}_\mathrm{f}(D_\mathrm{f})} + {{GE}_\mathrm{cho}(D_\mathrm{cho})},$$

where D_{p}, D_{f}, and D_{cho} are respectively the digestibility coefficients of protein, fat and carbohydrate calculated as

$$\frac {\text{intake}-\text{faecal excretion}}{\text{intake}}$$

for the constituent in question.

Urinary losses were calculated from the energy to nitrogen ratio in urine. Experimentally this was 7.9 kcal/g (33 kJ/g) urinary nitrogen and thus his equation for metabolisable energy became

$${ME} = \left ( {GE}_\mathrm{p} - \frac {7.9} {6.25} \right ) D_\mathrm{p} + {GE}_\mathrm{f} D_\mathrm{f} + {GE}_\mathrm{cho} D_\mathrm{cho}.$$

=== Gross energy values ===
Atwater collected values from the literature and also measured the heat of combustion of proteins, fats and carbohydrates. These vary slightly depending on sources and Atwater derived weighted values for the gross heat of combustion of the protein, fat and carbohydrate in the typical mixed diet of his time. It has been argued that these weighted values are invalid for individual foods and for diets whose composition in terms of foodstuffs is different from those eaten in the US in the early 20th century.

=== Apparent digestibility coefficients ===
Atwater measured a large number of digestibility coefficients for simple mixtures, and in substitution experiments derived values for individual foods. These he combined in a weighted fashion to derive values for mixed diets. When these were tested experimentally with mixed diets they did not give a good prediction, and Atwater adjusted the coefficients for mixed diets.

=== Urinary correction ===
The energy/nitrogen ratio in urine shows considerable variation and the energy/organic matter is less variable, but the energy/nitrogen value provided Atwater with a workable approach although this has caused some confusion and only applies for subjects in nitrogen balance.

== Modified system ==
Based on the work of Atwater, it became common practice to calculate energy content of foods using 4 kcal/g for carbohydrates and proteins and 9 kcal/g for lipids. The system was later improved by Annabel Merrill and Bernice Watt of the USDA, who derived a system whereby specific calorie conversion factors for different foods were proposed. This takes cognizance of the fact that first the gross energy values of the protein, fats and carbohydrates from different food sources are different, and second, that the apparent digestibility of the components of different foods is different.

This system relies on having measured heats of combustion of a wide range of isolated proteins, fats and carbohydrates. It also depends on data from digestibility studies, where individual foods have been substituted for basal diets in order to measure the apparent digestibility coefficients for those foods. This approach is based on the assumption that there are no interactions between foods in a mixture in the intestine, and from a practical view point, such studies with humans are difficult to control with the required accuracy.

== Assumptions based on the use of carbohydrates by difference and the effects of dietary fibre ==
The carbohydrate by difference approach presents several problems. First, it does not distinguish between sugars, starch and the unavailable carbohydrates (roughage, or "dietary fibre").

This affects first the gross energy that is assigned to carbohydrate—sucrose has a heat of combustion of 3.95 kcal/g (16.53 kJ/g) and starch 4.15 kcal/g (17.36 kJ/g).

Secondly it does not provide for the fact that sugars and starch are virtually completely digested and absorbed, and thus provide metabolisable energy equivalent to their heat of combustion.

The unavailable carbohydrates (dietary fibre) are degraded to a variable extent in the large bowel. The products of this microbial digestion are fatty acids, CO_{2} (carbon dioxide), methane and hydrogen. The fatty acids (acetate, butyrate and propionate) are absorbed in the large intestine and provide some metabolisable energy. The extent of degradation depends on the source of the dietary fibre (its composition and state of division), and the individual consuming the dietary fibre. There is insufficient data to give firm guidance on the energy available from this source.

Finally dietary fibre affects faecal losses of nitrogen and fat. Whether the increased fat loss is due to an effect on small intestinal absorption is not clear. The increased faecal nitrogen losses on high fibre diets are probably due to an increased bacterial nitrogen content of the faeces. Both these effects however lead to reductions in apparent digestibility, and therefore the Atwater system warrants small changes in the proper energy conversion factors for those diets.

== Theoretical and practical considerations relating to the calculation of energy values ==
=== Variations in heats of combustion of food constituents ===
==== Proteins ====
The experimental evidence for the magnitude of this variation is very limited, but as the heats of combustion of the individual amino-acids are different it is reasonable to expect variations between different proteins. An observed range of from 5.48 for conglutin (from blue lupin) to 5.92 for Hordein (barley) was reported, which compares with Atwaters' range of 5.27 for gelatin to 5.95 for wheat gluten. It is difficult to calculate expected values for a protein from amino-acid data, as some of the heats of combustion are not known accurately. Preliminary calculations on cow's milk suggest a value of around 5.5 kcal/g (23.0 kJ/g).

==== Fats ====
Analogously the experimental evidence is limited, but since the fatty acids differ in their heats of combustion one should expect fats to vary in heats of combustion. These differences are, however, relatively small – for example, breast milk fat has a calculated heat of combustion of 9.37 kcal/g (39.2 kJ/g) compared with that of cow milk fat of 9.19 kcal/g (38.5 kJ/g).

==== Carbohydrates ====
Monosaccharides have heats of combustion of around 3.75 kcal/g (15.7 kJ/g), disaccharides 3.95 kcal/g (16.5 kJ/g) and polysaccharides 4.15 to 4.20 kcal/g (17.4 to 17.6 kJ/g). The heat of hydrolysis is very small and these values are essentially equivalent when calculated on a monosaccharide basis. Thus 100 g sucrose gives on hydrolysis 105.6 g monosaccharide and 100 g starch gives on hydrolysis 110 g glucose.

=== Apparent digestibility coefficients ===
The human digestive tract is a very efficient organ, and the faecal excretion of nitrogenous material and fats is a small proportion (usually less than 10%) of the intake. Atwater recognised that the faecal excretion was a complex mixture of unabsorbed intestinal secretions, bacterial material and metabolites, sloughed mucosal cells, mucus, and only to a small extent, unabsorbed dietary components. This might be one reason why he chose to use availability rather than digestibility. His view was that these faecal constituents were truly unavailable and that his apparent disregard of the nature of faecal excretion was justifiable in a practical context.

The ratio $\frac {\text{intake}-\text{faecal excretion}}{ \text{intake}},$ wherever faecal excretion is small, will approximate to unity and thus these coefficients have a low variance and have the appearance of constants. This is spurious since faecal excretion is variable even on a constant diet, and there is no evidence to suggest that faecal excretion is in fact related to intake in the way implied by these coefficients.

=== Practical considerations in calculations of energy value of foods and diets ===
The calculation of energy values must be regarded as an alternative to direct measurement, and therefore is likely to be associated with some inaccuracy when compared with direct assessment. These inaccuracies arise for a number of reasons

- Variations in food composition: Foods are biological mixtures and as such show considerable variation in composition, particularly in respect of water and fat content. This means that compositional values quoted for representative samples of foods in food composition tables do not necessarily apply to individual samples of foods. In studies where great accuracy is required, samples of the food consumed must be analysed.
- Measurements of food intake: In estimating energy intakes, measurements of food intake are made, and these are known to be subject to considerable uncertainty. Even in studies under very close supervision the errors in weighing individual food items are rarely less than ±5%. A certain degree of pragmatism must therefore be used when assessing procedures for calculating energy intakes, and many authors impute greater accuracy to quoted calculated energy intakes than is justifiable.
- Individual variation: Variations in individuals are seen in all human studies, and these variations are not allowed for in most calculations.

The theoretical and physiological objections to the assumptions inherent in the Atwater system are likely to result in errors much smaller than these practical matters. Conversion factors were derived from experimental studies with young infants, but these produced values for metabolisable energy intake that were insignificantly different from those obtained by direct application of the modified Atwater factors.

== See also ==
- Food energy
- Calorimeter
