= Connecticut Agricultural Experiment Station =

- The Connecticut Agricultural Experiment Station
- U.S. National Register of Historic Places
- U.S. National Historic Landmark
- U.S. Historic district – Contributing property
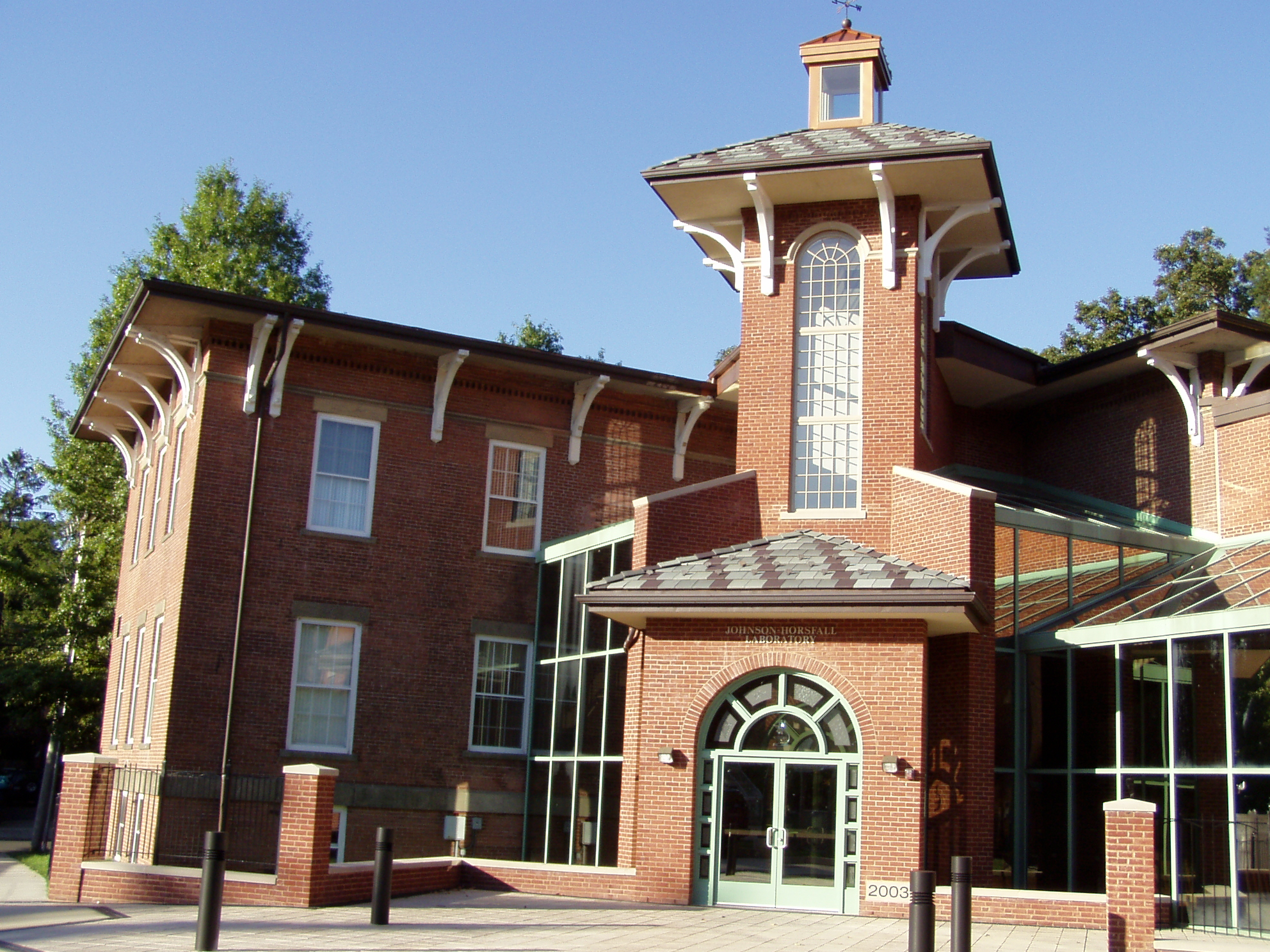
- The Johnson-Horsfall Laboratory, located at the main laboratories, New Haven

- Location within Connecticut Location within the United States
- Location: 123 Huntington Street, New Haven, Connecticut
- Coordinates: 41°19′50.64″N 72°55′10.43″W
- Area: 6.25 acres (2.53 ha)
- Built: 1882
- Part of: Prospect Hill Historic District (ID79002670)
- NRHP reference No.: 66000805

Significant dates
- Added to NRHP: October 15, 1966
- Designated NHL: July 19, 1964
- Designated CP: November 2, 1979

The Connecticut Agricultural Experiment Station (CAES) is the Connecticut state government's agricultural experiment station, a state government component that engages in scientific research and public outreach in agriculture and related fields. It is the oldest state experiment station in the United States, having been founded in 1875. Its official mission is to "develop, advance, and disseminate scientific knowledge, improve agricultural productivity and environmental quality, protect plants, and enhance human health and well-being through research for the benefit of Connecticut residents and the nation." The station operates a main research campus in New Haven, a research farm in Hamden, a satellite research facility and farm in Windsor, and a research farm in Griswold. The Storrs Agricultural Experiment Station is a separate agricultural research agency, founded in 1887 and part of the University of Connecticut, which also receives state and federal funding.

== Historic campus in New Haven ==
The experiment station's main facility in the Prospect Hill area of New Haven dates from 1882 when it became the permanent home of the first state agricultural experiment station. The station had been founded at Wesleyan University in 1875 and moved to Yale in 1877 as it became associated with the Sheffield Scientific School.

By 1882, the station needed more space, and Sheffield needed its space back. A 5-acre (20,000 m^{2}) property at the top of Prospect Hill was purchased and buildings built, using a $25,000 appropriation from the state legislature. The buildings include the Osborne Library, built in 1882-83 and believed to be the oldest building at any state agricultural experimental station, and the Johnson Laboratory, which has notably large brackets supporting its wide overhanging eaves. The station was declared a National Historic Landmark in 1964, recognizing its significance as the first state agricultural station in the nation.

For much of its history, the Connecticut Agricultural Experiment Station worked closely with the Storrs Agricultural Experiment Station, which was founded in 1887 at the University of Connecticut in Storrs.

The main campus in New Haven currently houses the activities of six departments: Analytical Chemistry, Biochemistry and Genetics, Entomology, Environmental Sciences, Forestry and Horticulture and Plant Pathology and Ecology.

== Recent research activities ==
=== Analytical Chemistry ===
The founding department of the Station, Analytical Chemistry began its work in 1875 testing fertilizer and later seeds, animal feed, human foods, drugs, and pesticides. This work continues today, and is organized into two categories: food safety and environmental monitoring. The department works with State and Federal agencies to improve pesticide and toxin screening of food sold in Connecticut. The department also has the capability to test for environmental contaminants and toxins in toys and other consumer products at very low concentrations. They test soils for heavy metals, and are investigating the cycling of organic pollutants in the environment, with an emphasis on phytoremediation issues. Additional investigations on the impact of nanoparticles on agricultural crops and on the potential contamination of the food chain are also being undertaken. Work has also been conducted in collaboration with Biochemistry and Genetics as well as colleagues from the Valley Laboratory to investigate which seed crops are best suited for the production of biodiesel in Connecticut. Recently, the department has been working with the US FDA on the testing of seafood from the Gulf of Mexico for chemical by-products of the Deepwater Horizon oil spill.

=== Biochemistry and Genetics ===
Biochemistry research began at the station in 1888 with the appointment of Thomas B. Osborne and Samuel W. Johnson to study plant proteins. Today, the department focuses largely on plant genetics to identify and clone beneficial plant genes to improve crop species. Recent work includes the control of soil-borne pests by cloning genes from plants in the mustard family (Brassicaceae) that enable plants to protect their roots from nematodes. Work is also conducted on elucidating the genetic basis for photosynthetic performance in plant leaves (10). Furthermore, the department helps protect honeybee colonies by developing early-detection tests for American Foulbrood(AFB) disease, and establish protocols to control the causal bacterium. This department was blended with other departments starting in 2015.

=== Entomology ===
The department is continuing its pioneering research on Lyme disease and its vector in Connecticut, the blacklegged tick (Ixodes scapularis); biological control of ticks using the fungus, Metarhizium anisopliae; and has developed new testing methods for tick-borne illnesses in humans, wildlife and domesticated animals. Every year, thousands of ticks are sent in from around the state to be tested for disease agents. The department also conducts research on the biology and control of exotic insects, including the invasive Asian long-horned beetle and emerald ash borer, looking at the chemistry of tree selection and mating behavior. The Entomology department supports agricultural production in Connecticut with integrated pest management (IPM) efforts, helping reduce pesticide use.

=== Environmental Sciences ===
The Experiment Station has conducted research on mosquitoes and the diseases they carry since 1909. This work is carried on today within the Environmental Sciences Department (formerly “Soil and Water”). Mosquitoes are collected from around the state of Connecticut then tested for West Nile virus, eastern equine encephalitis and other disease-causing agents. Researchers have also undertaken an effort to map the distribution of invasive aquatic plants within the state and investigate methods to control their growth and spread. Scientists are also conducting research on Phytoremediation, which focuses on the ability of certain cucurbit species to remove persistent organic pollutants (POPs) such as PCBs and DDT from soil. The department also tests soil samples sent in by Connecticut businesses and residents.

=== Forestry and Horticulture ===
New crops suited to Connecticut (such as Chinese cabbage, calabaza, and heirloom tomatoes as well as cultivars of wine grapes and different viticulture methods are being investigated. Scientists have also studied white-tailed deer (Odocoileus virginianus) behavior in hopes of keeping these animals away from highways to prevent vehicle-deer collisions, and to reduce damage to tree saplings, crops, and gardens. The department has surveyed certain forest plots every decade since 1927 (with the exception of 1947), providing information about how forests change over long periods of time. Researchers have also investigated techniques for crop-tree management that both increases yields and improves forest health. Department scientists are currently investigating the association of Japanese barberry (an invasive shrub), white-footed mice, and Ixodes ticks that carry the Lyme disease organism and other human pathogens in the state's forests, and cost-effective means to control invasive plant species.

=== Plant Pathology and Ecology ===
The plant pathology and ecology department works to expand knowledge of ecological interactions of plants, pathogens, and their environment to develop management strategies for plant pathogens with minimal use of pesticides. Current research includes investigating the use of nanoparticles of metal oxides on plant diseases, deciphering the role of soil protists in crop health, investigating the genetic structure in natural populations of a fungus causing perennial cankers of birch, understanding the genetics of pathogenic bacteria, and protecting CT vineyards from new viral pathogens. The department also runs a full service Plant Diagnostic Information Office and serves as the official seed testing laboratory for the state of Connecticut.

=== Valley Laboratory ===
Previously referred to as the “Tobacco Substation,” the Valley Laboratory in Windsor, CT has a long history of improving the cultivation of tobacco leaves in Connecticut for use as fine cigar wrappers. The “Tobacco Laboratory,” (now simply the Valley Laboratory) building was completed in 1941. Today, research covers areas such as the production of biofuel crops, invasive plant management, developing integrated pest management (IPM) methods for Connecticut nurseries, and management of the exotic hemlock woolly adelgid (Adelges tsugae).

=== Lockwood Farm ===
The research farm is named after William Raymond Lockwood. He was a resident of Norwalk, CT who willed his estate to CAES, proceeds from the sale of which went towards the purchase of 20 acres of land in the Mount Carmel area of Hamden, CT in 1909(12). During the mid-twentieth century, James G. Horsfall (former Station Director) used the farm to test organically-derived fungicides as a replacement for the heavy metals used to treat plant diseases at the time. Since 1931, the farm managers have taken daily, systematic weather measurements which provide information that can be used to study Connecticut's climate. Many plant varieties and growing methods are tested. Every year in August the farm hosts the annual Plant Science Day.

=== Griswold Research Center ===
The most recent addition to the CT Agricultural Experiment Station's holdings, Griswold Research Center, encompasses 14 acres of farmland in Griswold, CT and an additional parcel of forest in the adjacent town of Voluntown, CT. Transferred from the Connecticut Department of Environmental Protection (DEP) in 2008, current activities on the property include studies of cold-hardy grape vine varieties, the cultivation of rapeseed for biofuel production and the biocontrol of soil nematodes. There is also an office for the State Bee Inspector, who monitors Connecticut's honeybee populations.

== Station directors ==
The station has had just ten directors during its history:

- Dr. Wilbur Olin Atwater (1875–1877)
- Dr. Samuel William Johnson (1877–1900)
- Dr. Edward Hopkins Jenkins (1900–1923)
- Dr. William L. Slate (1923–1947)
- Dr. James G. Horsfall (1948–1971)
- Dr. Paul E. Waggoner (1972–1987)
- Dr. John F. Anderson (1987–2004)
- Dr. Louis A. Magnarelli (2004–2013)
- Dr. Theodore G. Andreadis (2013–2020)
- Dr. Jason C. White (2020–present)

== Notable scientific contributions ==
=== Amino acids and the discovery of vitamins ===
In 1909 station chemist Thomas B. Osborne began collaborating with Lafayette Mendel of Yale University to test the nutritive value of the proteins that Osborne had isolated from crop seeds.

Through feeding trials with albino rats, they determined that the type and quality of protein actually was more important to growth than quantity. They found that certain amino acids were lacking in the proteins isolated from grains. For example, when rats were given only zein, found in corn, as their protein source in an otherwise complete diet, their health declined and they died. This occurred because zein lacks the essential amino acids lysine and tryptophan. When the researchers added tryptophan to the isolated zein, rats were able to survive but did not grow. When both tryptophan and lysine were added, the rats both survived and grew rapidly. Osborne and Mendel also found that the gliadin, the protein found in wheat was lacking certain amino acids, and that like corn, these deficiencies could be amended by combining grain foods with animal proteins such as eggs or milk. This experiment demonstrated that animals need to acquire certain amino acids from food, which are now referred to as the essential amino acids.

In their study of proteins, Osborne and Mendel also aided in the discovery of vitamins. During their feeding trials, they noticed that young rats fed diets with sufficient carbohydrate (in the form of wheat flour) and purified protein, but with vegetable fats or lard instead of butter grew and developed normally for around eighty days, then suddenly began to decline in health and weight then soon died. Many of the animals also developed sore eyes or even ulcers on their eyeballs. Something other than carbohydrates, fats and complete proteins was missing from this artificial diet. When a small amount of butter was added to the feed mixture, the afflicted rats soon recovered completely and continued growing. Whole-milk powder also had the same effect on rat growth. In 1913, the Station's Annual Report stated that “experiments have shown that some still unknown substance is essential to growth and that this unknown substance is present in milk. Much work is being done in an effort to discover an isolate this substance.” As it turns out, this substance was Vitamin A. Concurrently with Osborne and Mendel, Elmer V. McCollum (a former student of Osborne) and Marguerite Davis at the University of Wisconsin were obtaining similar results, and although the scientists submitted their report for publication several weeks prior to the Station scientists, it is clear that both parties discovered vitamins independently.

=== Development of hybrid corn ===
In the early 20th century, Station scientists Edward M. East and Herbert K. Hayes began attempts to improve the quality and yield of corn (Zea mays) through selective breeding and hybridization. In 1906, East realized that steps to prevent self- and close-fertilization made it easier to select for desirable traits (such as large ear size) when breeding. Hayes and East later found described that a cross, or hybrid, between two inbred varieties of corn produced offspring that was more vigorous, larger and hardier that both of the parents, but this improvement was lost over successive inbred generations.

In 1914, Donald F. Jones arrived at the station at the age of twenty-five, and began to build upon the work of East and Hayes. By 1917, he had published his theory of “heterosis,” which explained the increased vigor and yield observed in hybrid maize. The same year, he created a double-cross hybrid corn by breeding two separate hybrid individuals. This new cross descended from four distinct inbred lines, and was even more vigorous than either of its parents. However, like the single-cross hybrid, this improvement was lost over subsequent generations of inbreeding. Jones published his double-cross method in 1919, and began actively promoting the technique as a means to improve corn production nationally: “it is something that may easily be taken up by seedsmen; in fact, it is the first time in agricultural history that a seedsman is enabled to gain full benefit from a desirable origination of his own… The utilization of first generation hybrids enables to originator to keep the parental types and give out only the crossed seeds, which are less valuable for continued propagation.”

Because corn is a self-fertilizing plant, the prevention of inbreeding when producing hybrid seeds required time-consuming detasseling. In the 1940s and 50's, Jones collaborated with Paul Mangelsdorf of Harvard University to eliminate the need to remove the tassels from plants in seed production through utilizing a sterile plant and male restorer gene, making the production of corn more cost-efficient.

=== "Morgan" method of soil testing ===
Dr. M. F. Morgan, Chief of Soils Department for twenty years, developed a method that still bears his name to test for soil nutrients that are available to plants using weak acids. This test was able to estimate deficiencies or excesses of plant nutrients in soil. Dr. Morgan was also a Lieutenant Colonel in the U.S. Army during World War II, and was killed in action on the Leyte Island in the Philippines in 1945.

Morgan's soil test became the world's first widely accepted method for efficiently estimating soil fertility, and is still in use today.

=== Tick-borne diseases ===
In 1975, there was a cluster of juvenile arthritis patients in the towns of Lyme and Old Lyme, CT, and scientists at the Station were among the first to determine that this disease was carried by ticks. After this discovery, scientists at the Station, including Dr. John F. Anderson and Dr. Louis A. Magnarelli (former Station Directors) along with collaborators from other institutions were able to isolate and identify the spirochete that causes Lyme disease in humans. Scientists at the Station were also instrumental in developing antibody tests to identify patients infected with Lyme disease agent as well as other tick-borne illnesses such as human granulocytic erlichiosis and babesiosis.

== Timeline of significant events ==
1875: The Connecticut Agricultural Experiment Station is established; the first in the United States, and precursor for the nation's industrial research laboratories; founded twenty-five years prior to the General Electric laboratories, which was the first of its kind.

1882: The Station moves to its current location on Huntington Street in New Haven, land purchased from the Eli Whitney, Jr. family

1890: Dr. Roland Thaxter, botanist at the Station, determines the cause of potato scab (an actinomycete that infects tubers).

1900: Sumatran tobacco was planted under cloth canopies in Connecticut in an effort to simulate Sumatra's tropical climate. The resulting shade grown tobacco was considered second to none for making cigar wrappers and consequently revolutionized the industry in the Connecticut Valley.

1903: State entomologist William E. Britton and G. P. Clinton issue the first pesticide “spray calendar” to be used by Connecticut farmers.

1905: The first gypsy moth discovered in Connecticut was found in Stonington, CT by E. Frensch of Mystic, CT. A female specimen, collected on July 25, was given to W. E. Britton and is still present in the Station's insect collection.

1907: Chestnut blight first seen in Connecticut.

1913: Thomas B. Osborne, chemist at the Station, and Lafayette B. Mendel of Yale University demonstrate with rat feeding studies that animals require twenty essential amino acids in their diet, and identify a “yellow substance” in butterfat vital for animal growth, which turned out to be Vitamin A

1917: The first hybrid corn using a four-way cross made by geneticist Donald F. Jones. He also publishes the theory of “heterosis” to explain hybrid vigor in corn.

1919: Jones invents a double cross pollination method, which allows for commercial production of hybrid corn.

1921: The Valley Laboratory established in Windsor, CT (called Tobacco Substation at the time).

1933: Dutch elm disease was found in extreme southwestern Connecticut.

1938: First report of X-disease of peach in the U.S. by E. M. Stoddard

1942: Dr. M. F. Morgan, developer of the Morgan method of soil testing and Chief of the Soils Department, was killed in action in the Philippines during World War II.

1949: A. E. Dimond developed an injectable chemotherapy to treat Dutch elm disease.

1960: R.C. Wallis of the Station and collaborators isolated a virus that causes encephalitis from Aedes vexans, mosquitoes found in Connecticut.

1969: EPIDEM, the first computer simulation for development of a disease epidemic, was developed by P. E. Waggoner and J. G. Horsfall for early blight on tomato and potato.

1975: Biological control of chestnut blight was demonstrated using hypovirulence, which was associated with dsRNA transmitted by hyphal anastomosis.

1983: John F. Anderson, Louis A. Magnarelli (Station Director and Deputy Director, respectively, at the time) along with colleagues from Yale University and Centers for Disease Control and Prevention, are able to isolated the causative agent of Lyme disease (the spirochete Borrelia burdorferi) from Ixodes ticks, a raccoon, and a white-footed mouse.

1989: T.G. Andreadis and R. M. Weseloh discover the fungus that caused the collapse of gypsy moth populations.

1994: S. L. Anagnostakis is given the first permit to release a genetically recombinant biocontrol agent into a Connecticut forest in an attempt to control chestnut blight disease.

1995: Magnarelli, Anderson and collaborators from Yale University, Johns Hopkins University, and University of Minnesota demonstrated that patients with Lyme disease also had antibodies to organisms that cause babesiosis and ehrlichiosis; Magnarelli, K.C. Stafford and scientists from the Johns Hopkins University and University of Rhode Island detected the DNA of the human granulocytic ehrlichiosis agent in ticks.

2005: The Department of Analytical Chemistry was selected through a competitive process as one of eight state laboratories across the country to receive funding from the United States Food and Drug Administration as a participant in the FERN (Food Emergency Response Network).

2009: The Center for Vector Biology and Zoonotic Diseases is established at the Station. This joint venture between the Entomology and Environmental Sciences Departments aims to better understand the biology of arthropod-borne diseases and the organisms that transmit them.

2010: New methods developed to test seafood from the Gulf of Mexico for contamination with petroleum-related chemicals.

2011: Department of Entomology scientists make the first identification of the Emerald Ash Borer in CT

2012: The Plant Disease Information Office scientific staff make the first positive identification of Boxwood Blight in CT

2012: The Department of Analytical Chemistry, in conjunction with the US Food and Drug Administration, tests food from the Democratic and Republican National Conventions for toxins and poisons

2013: Valley Laboratory Scientists are awarded a US Patent on the disease-resistant “Rubicon” strawberry

2014: The Station Board of Control establishes the Louis A. Magnarelli Post-Doctoral Fellowship Program

2015: Opened the renovated and addition to the new Jenkins-Waggoner Laboratory

== See also ==
- List of National Historic Landmarks in Connecticut
- National Register of Historic Places listings in New Haven, Connecticut
