= Storrs Agricultural Experiment Station =

American agricultural experiment station

Coordinates: 41.8122°N 72.2483°W

The Storrs Agricultural Experiment Station (SAES) is an American agricultural experiment station operated by the University of Connecticut and founded in 1887. Part of UConn's College of Agriculture, Health, and Natural Resources, the SAES directs agriculture-related research while the university's Cooperative Extension Service engages in community education and outreach. Kumar Venkitanarayanan is the Station's associate director. Its offices are located in the W. B. Young Building on the main UConn campus in Storrs.

== History ==
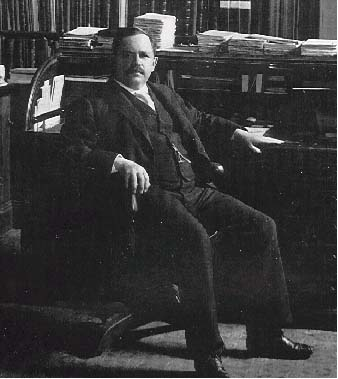
Wilbur Atwater, first director, Storrs Agricultural Experiment Station

The Storrs Agricultural Experiment Station was established on May 18, 1887, when the Connecticut General Assembly voted to divide Hatch Act of 1887 funds 50/50 between the Storrs Agricultural School and the Connecticut Agricultural Experiment Station in New Haven, which had been established in 1875. Hatch Act revenue amounting to $7,500 per year was instrumental in establishing the new station. On March 27, 1888, the Station's first director, Wilbur Olin Atwater, commenced his duties.

Land-grant university status was transferred from Yale University to Storrs Agricultural School in 1893, energizing the Storrs Agricultural Experiment Station. In 1895, the General Assembly granted an annual appropriation of $1,800 to the SAES. During the station's early years, practical farming experiments mostly took place there, while the "more purely scientific investigations" took place at the chemical laboratories at Wesleyan University. The station's work was centralized exclusively in 1902.

The SAES saw continued growth during the 1900s. The $15,000 awarded by the Adams Act of 1906 (a sequel to the Hatch Act) was divided equally with New Haven, doubling each station's federal funding. The Storrs [sic] International Egg Laying Contest, one of the first such contests in the world, began in 1911. Publications included influential research bulletins such as New England Trees in Winter (1911) by Albert Francis Blakeslee and Chester D. Jarvis. The Station's staff either conducted research full-time or split their time between research and teaching. As required by law, the Station published a biennial report as well as scores of research bulletins over the course of its existence.

In 1913, Edward Hopkins Jenkins was appointed to oversee both Connecticut stations—a move "intended to further insure harmony of purpose and to prevent duplication of effort." The appointment strengthened the emphasis at Storrs Agricultural School on dairy, poultry, and animal husbandry research, whereas New Haven tended to specialize in plant research. The Purnell Act of 1925 granted $60,000 annually to the State of Connecticut, which again divided these funds equally between the two stations. Additional federal funding enabled the SAES to diversify its research, studying agricultural economics, rural sociology, and home economics.

The General Assembly appropriated $70,000 to construct the Wilbur O. Atwater Laboratory, dedicated on the UConn campus on June 12, 1930. It was the only building for the primary use of the Station, aside from a two-story frame building that housed the Station's offices and library, built in the 1890s and torn down in the 1920s.

The SAES continues to conduct and publish research. It also awards competitive capacity research grants.

== Notable staff ==
- Wilbur Olin Atwater, director (1888–1902)
- Louis Adelbert Clinton, director (1902–1912)
- Edward Hopkins Jenkins, director (1913–1923)
- William L. Slate Jr., director (1923–1949)
- A. A. Spielman, associate director (1949–1962)
- William Crawford Kennard, associate director (1962–?)
- Kumar Venkitanarayanan, associate director (2017–present)
