= Yale School of Engineering and Applied Science =

Engineering school in Connecticut, United States

- Coat of arms of the Yale School of Engineering and Applied Science
- Former names: Engineering Department (1852–1932); School of Engineering (1932–1961); Faculty of Engineering (1961–2008)
- Type: Private
- Established: 1852; 174 years ago
- Affiliations: Yale University
- Dean: Jeffrey Brock
- Location: New Haven, Connecticut, USA
- Website: engineering.yale.edu

The Yale School of Engineering and Applied Science is the engineering school of Yale University. When the first professor of civil engineering was hired in 1852, a Yale School of Engineering was established within the Yale Scientific School, and in 1932 the engineering faculty organized as a separate, constituent school of the university. The school currently offers undergraduate and graduate classes and degrees in electrical engineering, chemical engineering, computer science, applied physics, environmental engineering, biomedical engineering, and mechanical engineering and materials science.

== History ==
=== Establishment in the Sheffield Scientific School (1852–1919) ===
Engineering education at Yale began more than a century before the founding of a School of Engineering. In the first half of the nineteenth century, chemistry professor Benjamin Silliman made fundamental contributions to the fractional distillation of petroleum, and his son, chemistry professor Benjamin Silliman, Jr., commercialized the process as a fuel source. In 1852, William A. Norton moved from Brown University to become Yale's first professor of civil engineering, which established a faculty of engineering at Yale.

In 1854, two years after Norton's appointment, engineering became part of the new Scientific School, renamed the Sheffield Scientific School in 1860 in honor of Joseph Earl Sheffield. In 1863, Yale granted the first American Ph.D. in engineering to J. Willard Gibbs, who later taught at Yale and became one of the founders of the field of thermodynamics.

Professor Norton was joined by physicist Chester Lyman in 1859, by mechanical engineering professor William P. Trowbridge in 1870, and A. Jay DuBois in 1877, who succeeded Trowbridge. By the end of the century, the Engineering Department had three sub-departments: civil engineering, mechanical engineering, and electrical engineering. The last of these fields was introduced at Yale by Charles S. Hastings and Henry A. Bumstead in the 1880s.

=== School foundation, dissolution, and revival (1919–) ===
In the first half of the twentieth century, a gradual reorganization of engineering education at Yale took place with the integration of Sheffield programs with Yale College and Graduate School and, in 1932, the creation of a School of Engineering. In 1961, the school was reduced to a department within Yale College.

Though a new Marcel Breuer–designed engineering building was opened in 1970, the demotion of the school caused Yale's engineering programs to atrophy. University administrators discussed entirely restructuring, or possibly eliminating, the faculty in the early 1990s. The appointment of D. Allan Bromley as Dean of Engineering in 1994 provided much-needed momentum. Bromley, a nuclear physicist and science adviser to U.S. president George H. W. Bush, was a forceful advocate for engineering at Yale. New programs in biomedical and environmental engineering were introduced during his tenure. Bromley also instituted the Sheffield Fellowship, to recognize technological leaders, the Sheffield Distinguished Teaching Awards, and the "Select Program", a five-year combined B.S. M.Eng. degree program, all named to honor the Sheffield Scientific School.

In 2000, Paul A. Fleury was appointed Dean. The department received renewed university investment beginning in the same year, when Yale President Richard Levin announced a $500 million capital investment in sciences and engineering at Yale. The Malone Engineering Center was opened in 2005 to expand campus facilities for biomedical engineering and teaching, establishing a separate Department of Biomedical Engineering. The building was named by businessman John C. Malone for his father.

In 2008, T. Kyle Vanderlick was appointed Dean and the school was reestablished as the School of Engineering & Applied Science. In 2009, Vanderlick created the Advanced Graduate Leadership Program, a unique and competitive program designed to provide doctoral students with experiences and training beyond the research lab. In July 2010, the school was reorganized by the university. The Department of Mechanical Engineering was renamed the Department of Mechanical Engineering & Materials Science and the Department of Chemical Engineering was renamed the Department of Chemical & Environmental Engineering to showcase both degree programs. The Department of Applied Physics became an independent department within the Graduate School of Arts and Sciences. In 2011, John C. Malone made a $50 million gift to the school, endowing 10 professorships. In 2012, the school opened the Center for Engineering Innovation & Design.

Vanderlick was reappointed by the university for a second term in 2013. In March 2015, Yale's Department of Computer Science joined the university's four engineering departments as part of the School of Engineering & Applied Science. In June 2016, construction began on an underground teaching concourse that will physically link the Department of Computer Science to other main engineering buildings. The 10,000-square-foot space is designed specifically for undergraduate engineering laboratories and hands-on learning experiences.

Engineering at Yale experienced a renaissance during Vanderlick's tenure as dean. Interest and enrollment in Yale's engineering programs flourished and numerous student groups centered on engineering were created. Notably, the school has consistently maintained one of the highest percentage of engineering bachelor's degrees awarded to women in the nation. Vanderlick led the recruitment of more than 30 new faculty members and paved the way for vital capital improvements to include extensive research space and state-of-the-art teaching facilities. Fundraising during Vanderlick's time as dean reached record highs for the school, including gifts of $50 million for 10 new endowed faculty chairs, $26 million to create and sustain the Center for Engineering Innovation & Design, $20 million for growth in computer science, and $10 million for the new undergraduate teaching concourse scheduled to open in fall 2017.

In January 2017, it was announced that Vanderlick would return full-time to teaching and research after her term as dean concludes. In a message to the university community, President Peter Salovey praised Vanderlick's energy and creativity as well as her success in bringing to life the “cool nature of engineering.” Salovey also noted that Vanderlick “excelled in carrying out her charge to reinvigorate engineering at Yale” and credited her for the university's reemergence “as a national leader in engineering education and research.” In 2023, Yale announced a "historic investment in engineering" encompassing several major construction projects over the next 10 to 15 years, on sites already owned and occupied by the university.

== Buildings ==
Name	Photograph	Year Built	Architect	Description
Arthur K. Watson Hall		1893	J. Cleaveland Cady	The original four-story brick Romanesque Revival building, trimmed with East Haven sandstone and terra cotta, was constructed as the Sheffield Chemical Laboratory. Currently houses the Department of Computer Science.
Mason Laboratory		1911	Charles C. Haight	Built originally for the Sheffield Scientific School, it was the gift of Sheffield graduates William Smith Mason and George Grant Mason. Mason was remodeled in 1967 and provides classroom, office, and laboratory facilities.
Dunham Laboratory		1912	Henry G. Morse	Also built for Sheffield, it was the gift of Austin Cornelius Dunham. This Collegiate Gothic building includes laboratories, classrooms and offices. Addition added in 1958 (office of Douglas Orr).
Becton Engineering and Applied Science Center		1970	Marcel Breuer	Built from pre-cast concrete panels, Becton contains offices, laboratories, a cafe, and an auditorium. Funded in part by a donation from Henry P. Becton.
17 Hillhouse Avenue		1971	Westerman & Miller Associates	A five-story structure of Indiana limestone that houses the Yale Institute for Network Science and contains space and classrooms for the School of Engineering & Applied Science.
David S. Malone Engineering Center		2005	Cesar Pelli	This triangular building was funded in part by John C. Malone and built with a limestone veneer and a glass curtain wall. Malone contains laboratories for research and teaching. The building fronts the Farmington Canal

== Deans ==
- Robert Doherty, 1932–1936
- Samuel W. Dudley, 1936–1948
- Walter J. Wohlenberg, 1948–1955
- Dana Young, 1955–1961
- Felix Zweig, 1961–1966
- D. Allan Bromley, 1994–2000
- Paul A. Fleury, 2000–2007
- T. Kyle Vanderlick, 2008–2017
- Jeffrey Brock, 2019–present

== See also ==
- Engineering
- Glossary of engineering
- List of Yale University people
- Yale Science & Engineering Association
