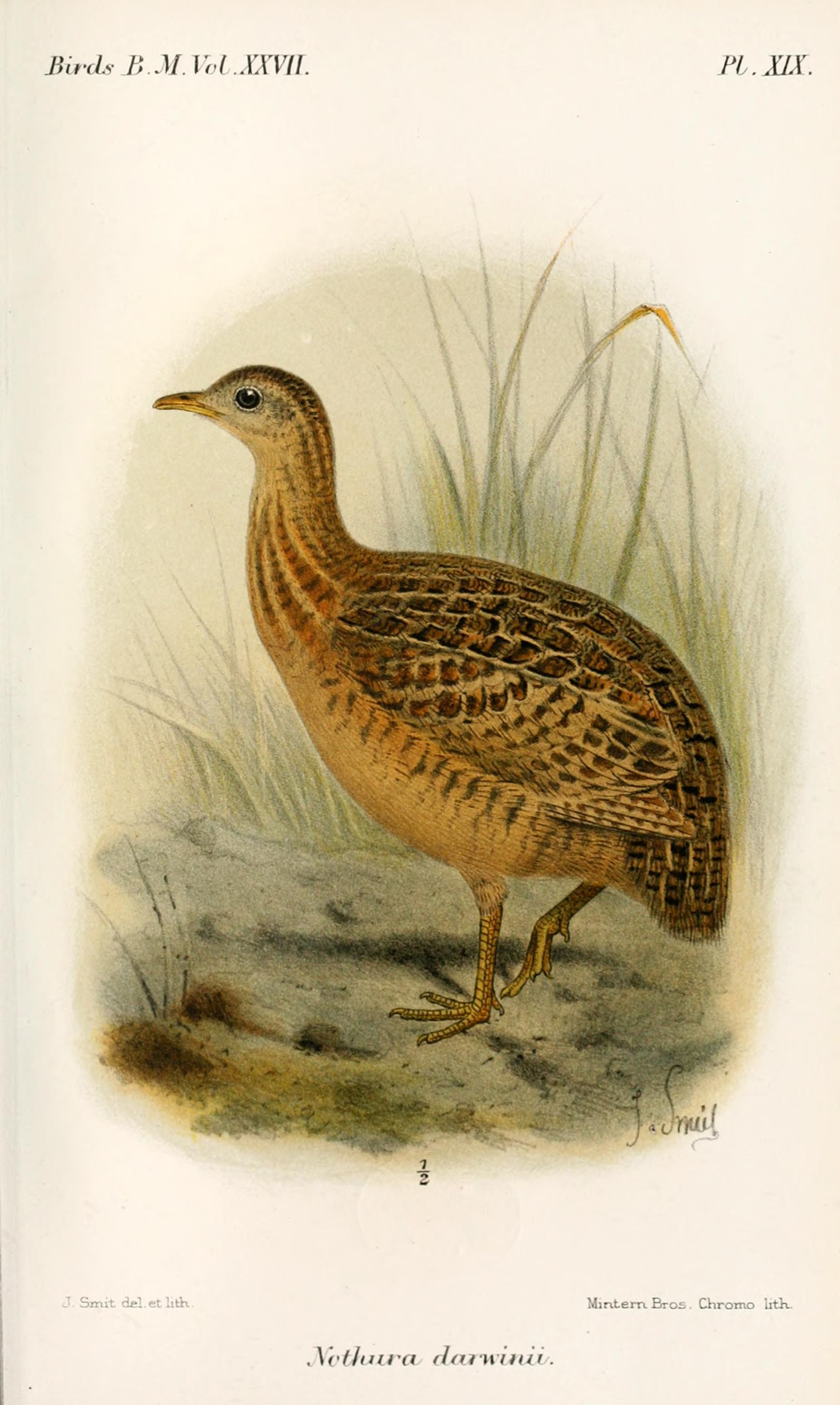
- Illustration by Joseph Smit, 1895

Conservation status
- Least Concern (IUCN 3.1)

Scientific classification
- Kingdom: Animalia
- Phylum: Chordata
- Class: Aves
- Infraclass: Palaeognathae
- Order: Tinamiformes
- Family: Tinamidae
- Genus: Nothura
- Species: N. darwinii

Binomial name
- Nothura darwinii G. R. Gray, 1867

Subspecies
- N. d. darwinii (G. R. Gray, 1867); N. d. peruviana (Berlepsch & Stolzmann, 1906); N. d. agassizii (Bangs, 1910); N. d. boliviana (Salvadori, 1895); N. d. salvadorii (Hartert, 1909)

= Darwin's nothura =

Species of bird

Darwin's nothura (Nothura darwinii) is a type of tinamou commonly found in high-altitude grassland in the southern Andes in South America.

== Etymology ==
The name of the species is named after Charles Darwin, an eminent English naturalist, to commemorate him.

== Taxonomy ==
All tinamou are from the family Tinamidae, and in the larger scheme are also ratites. Unlike other ratites, tinamous can fly, although in general, they are not strong fliers. All ratites evolved from prehistoric flying birds, and tinamous are the closest living relative of these birds.

=== Subspecies ===
- N. d. darwinii, the nominate subspecies, occurs in the Patagonian steppes of south-central Argentina
- N. d. peruviana occurs in southern Peru, in the Urubamba Valley in Cusco Region
- N. d. agassizii occurs in the altiplano of southeastern Peru and western Bolivia
- N. d. boliviana occurs in the highlands of western Bolivia; Cochabamba, Chuquisaca, Potosí, Oruro, and Tarija Departments
- N. d. salvadorii occurs in western Argentina

=== Description ===
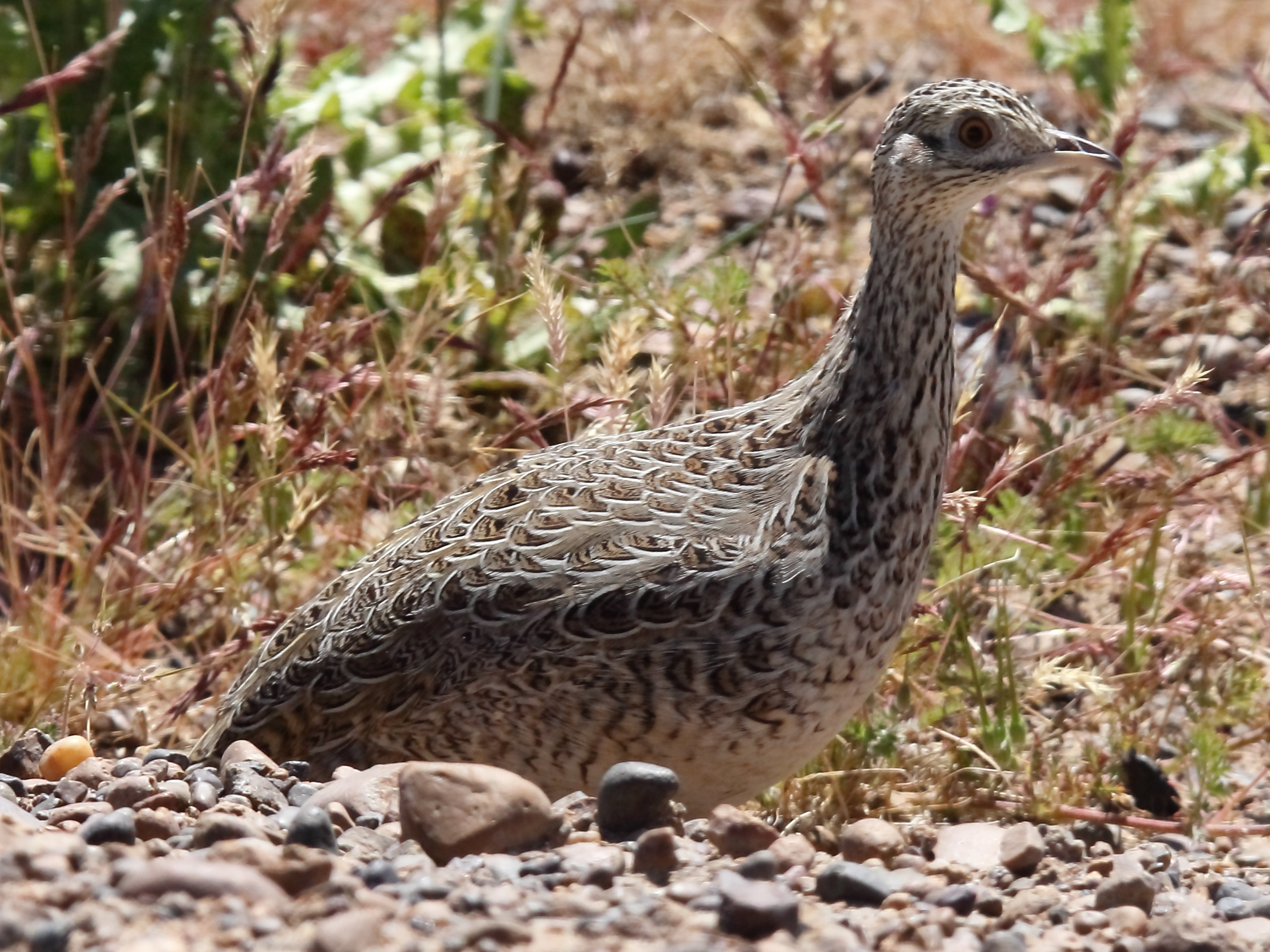
Darwin's nothura in Argentina

The Darwin's nothura is approximately 26 cm (10 in) in length. It is similar to spotted nothura but more rufous with broader streaking below. Its upper parts are brown and streaked with buff, its lower parts are streaked with chestnut and it is black on its breast Its flanks are barred, and its crown is black with buff streaks, and its throat is white.

== Behavior ==
Like other tinamous, the Darwin's nothura eats fruit off the ground or low-lying bushes. They also eat small amounts of invertebrates, flower buds, tender leaves, seeds, and roots. The male incubates the eggs which may come from different females, and then will raise them until they are ready to be on their own. The nest is located on the ground in dense brush or between raised root buttresses.

== Conservation ==
The IUCN classifies this tinamou as Least Concern, with an occurrence range of 1,100,000 km^{2} (420,000 sq mi).
