= Chaco nothura =

Scientific classification
- Kingdom: Animalia
- Phylum: Chordata
- Class: Aves
- Infraclass: Palaeognathae
- Order: Tinamiformes
- Family: Tinamidae
- Genus: Nothura
- Species: N. maculosa
- Subspecies: N. m. chacoensis

Trinomial name
- Nothura maculosa chacoensis (Conover, 1937)

Subspecies of bird

The Chaco nothura (Nothura maculosa chacoensis) is a type of tinamou commonly found in brushland in Argentina and Paraguay.

== Description ==
The Chaco nothura is approximately 24 cm (9.4 in) in length. It is similar to the spotted nothura, but paler and buffier overall.

== Range and habitat ==
The Chaco nothura inhabits subtropical and tropical brushland up to 500 m (1,600 ft) in altitude. This species is native to the chaco of northwestern Paraguay and north central Argentina in South America.

== Taxonomy ==
The Chaco nothura is a subspecies of spotted nothura, Nothura maculosa.

All tinamou are from the family Tinamidae, and in the larger scheme are also ratites. Unlike other ratites, tinamous can fly, although in general, they are not strong fliers. All ratites evolved from prehistoric flying birds, and tinamous are the closest living relative of these birds.
