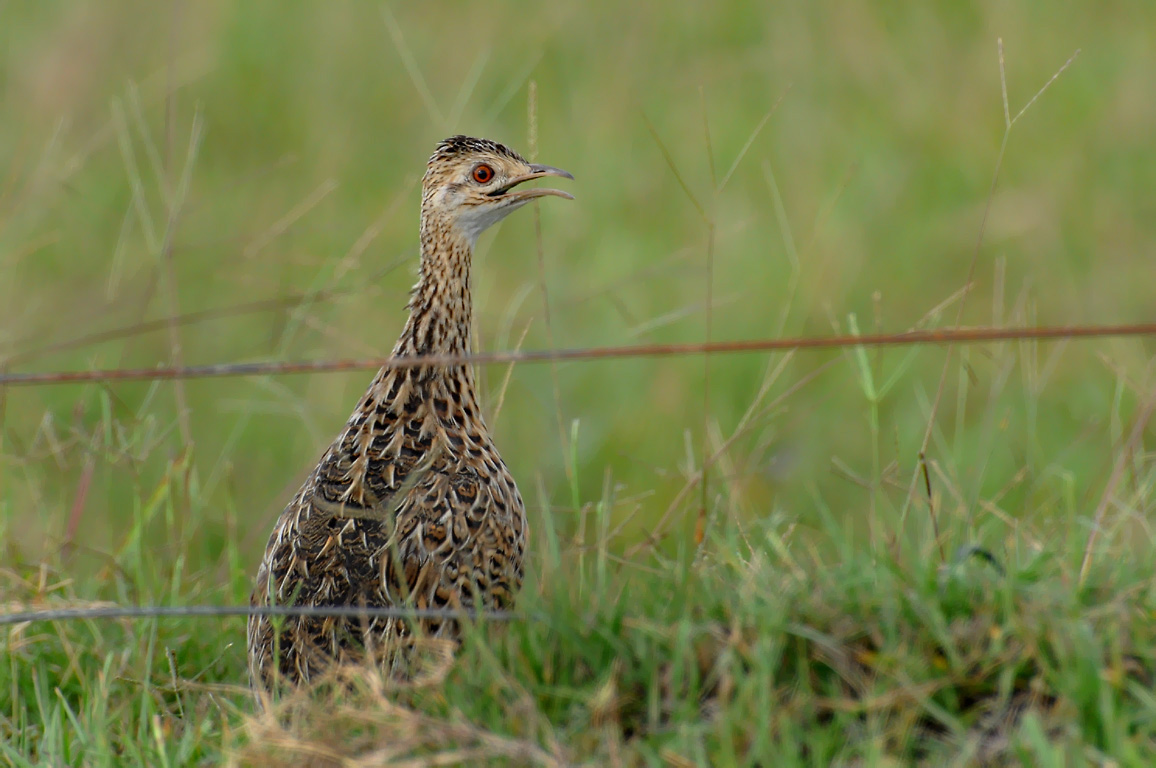
- Nothura maculosa, spotted nothura

Scientific classification
- Kingdom: Animalia
- Phylum: Chordata
- Class: Aves
- Infraclass: Palaeognathae
- Order: Tinamiformes
- Family: Tinamidae
- Subfamily: Nothurinae
- Genus: Nothura; Wagler, 1827

Type species
- Tinamus boraquira von Spix, 1825

Species
- Nothura boraquira White-bellied nothura Nothura minor Lesser nothura Nothura darwinii Darwin's nothura Nothura maculosa Spotted nothura

= Nothura =

Genus of birds

Nothura is a genus of birds in the tinamou family. This genus comprises five members of this South American family.

Tinamous are paleognaths related to the flightless ratites. They are probably close in appearance to the flying ancestors of the ratites.

== Species ==
The species in taxonomic order are:

- †N. paludosa Mercerat 1897
- †N. parvula (Brodkorb 1963) Tambussi 1989 [Cayeornis parvulus Brodkorb 1963]
- Nothura boraquira, white-bellied nothura, located in northeastern and central Brazil, eastern Bolivia, and northeastern Paraguay
- Nothura minor, lesser nothura, located in the interior of southeastern Brazil
- Nothura darwinii, Darwin's nothura, located in southern Peru, western Bolivia, and southern and western Argentina
  - Nothura darwinii darwinii located in south central Argentina
  - Nothura darwinii peruviana located in southern Peru
  - Nothura darwinii agassizii located in southeastern Peru and western Bolivia
  - Nothura darwinii boliviana located in western Bolivia
  - Nothura darwinii salvadorii located in western Argentina
- Nothura maculosa, spotted nothura, located in Argentina, Paraguay, Uruguay, eastern and southern Brazil
  - Nothura maculosa maculosa located in southern Brazil, Uruguay, eastern Paraguay, and northeastern Argentina
  - Nothura maculosa major located in the interior of east central Brazil
  - Nothura maculosa nigroguttata located in south central Argentina
  - Nothura maculosa cearensis located in northeastern Brazil
  - Nothura maculosa paludivaga located in central Paraguay and north central Argentina
  - Nothura maculosa annectens located in eastern Argentina
  - Nothura maculosa submontana located in southwestern Argentina
  - Nothura maculosa pallida located in northwestern Argentina
  - Nothura maculosa chacoensis, Chaco nothura, located in northwestern Paraguay and north central Argentina
