= Paul A. Fleury =

American physicist and academic administrator (1939–2026)

Paul Aimé Fleury (July 20, 1939 – April 30, 2026) was an American physicist and academic administrator. He was the dean of the faculty of engineering at Yale University and was the Frederick W. Beinecke Professor of Engineering and Applied Physics and professor of physics.

== Life and career ==
Fleury was born in Baltimore, Maryland on July 20, 1939. He was educated at John Carroll University (B.S, 1960) and MIT (Ph.D., 1965). Fleury was at AT&T Bell Laboratories from 1970 until 1995 including work at Sandia National Laboratories. Fleury was the dean of the school of engineering at the University of New Mexico from 1996 to 2000. He then succeeded D. Allan Bromley as dean of engineering at Yale. In 2007, he became the director of the Yale Institute for Nanoscience and Quantum Engineering. He kept that position after retiring from the deanship at the end of 2007.

His research was in experimental condensed matter physics and material science including dynamic aspects of phase transformations and optical spectroscopy.

He was elected a member of the National Academy of Engineering in 1996 for discoveries related to ferroelectric, acoustic, and nonlinear performance of materials, and for management leadership in materials. He was also a member of the National Academy of Sciences and the American Academy of Arts and Sciences and a Fellow of the American Association for the Advancement of Science. He received the Michelson–Morley Award (1985) and the Frank Isakson prize for optical effects in solids (1992) from the American Physical Society.

Fleury died on April 30, 2026, at the age of 86.

== Sources ==
- "Paul Aimé Fleury." Marquis Who's Who, 2006. Reproduced in Biography Resource Center. Farmington Hills, Mich.: Thomson Gale. 2007.
