= Yale Scientific Magazine =

- Discipline: Multidisciplinary
- Language: English

Publication details
- History: 1894-present
- Publisher: Yale Scientific Publications, Inc (United States)
- Frequency: Quarterly

Standard abbreviations
- ISO 4: Yale Sci. Mag.

Indexing
- ISSN: 0044-0140 (print); 0044-0140 (web)

Links
- Journal homepage; Online access; Online archive

The Yale Scientific Magazine (YSM) is a scientific magazine published quarterly by undergraduate students from Yale University. It was founded at the Sheffield Scientific School of Yale in 1894. Before 1927, it was originally called Yale Scientific Monthly or Yale Sheffield Monthly. As the first student magazine devoted to the sciences, it is the oldest collegiate science quarterly in the United States.

Over 100 students are involved in various aspects of the magazine, including writing, editorial, production, art, multimedia, website, and business. It currently has more than 2,000 subscribers around the world. Article topics covered by Yale Scientific Magazine include disciplines in science, mathematics, and engineering, at Yale and beyond. The magazine presents and promotes achievements, knowledge, and activities in the sciences, medicine, and engineering at the university.

== History ==
=== The Early Years: 1894–1912 ===
In October 1894, the senior class of Yale’s Sheffield Scientific School (or the “Sheff”) published the first issue of the Yale Scientific Monthly. The Monthly was founded in response to “the rapid growth of the Scientific School, and the important position it was attaining in the affairs of the University", such that "the establishment of a representative undergraduate periodical in the institution would be consistent with the progress along other lines.” One of its main purposes was to be a comfortable medium in which Sheff students could develop their writing skills, something many Sheff graduates had complained to not have done in their undergraduate years. Senior members of the Sheffield Class of 1895 sought the advice of literary instructors, and certain Sheff faculty, and subsequently formed YSM.

At its founding, the Yale Scientific Monthly was unique for the diverse range of subjects within the sciences it covered. Its first four articles were: “The Sheffield Scientific School,” a history; “Diameters of Stepped Pulleys”; “Something About Bacteria”, and “Some Landmarks in the Life of Chemistry.” The magazine’s policy was to publish both student and faculty articles. Yale undergraduates performed all editorial and managerial work. The cost of the first issue was $0.30, and a year’s subscription was $2.50. The magazine’s stated address was simply: “Yale Scientific Monthly, New Haven, Conn.”

For 18 years, the Monthly was an opportunity for young scientists at the Sheffield Scientific School to act as journalists. In the process they kept the rest of the Yale community informed about important and interesting developments in all scientific departments at Yale, and in the general scientific community. It was of a high quality, and served as a model for the development of college science magazines at other institutions. As a serious scientific journal, YSM’s success was marginalized. Yale College students were seldom to read scientific works to relax. Sheff men needed escapes from and not supplements to their science-packed schedules. Nonetheless, it continued to rise in the estimation of Sheff students.

The staff consisted of members of the Sheff who had “heeled” the magazine. “Heeling” was one of Old Blue’s [Yale’s] many traditions that have long since vanished from practice into lore. Common among many organizations, heeling competitions were held periodically as a means of determining staff members. Heelers were told to purchase a Yale Co-op Heeler’s Notebook, and rent or buy a bicycle for the competition. They were then assigned tasks in every aspect of the magazine’s operation, and were graded on a point system. The point total and general quality of the heeler’s work were the criteria used in judging them as a perspective member. If a member won several heeling competitions, they would be entitled to a “charm.” Board membership was granted upon the attainment of a charm, which was also awarded to select students who consistently contributed quality works to YSM.

=== The Troubled Years: 1918–1926 ===
The editorial board of the nineteenth volume of the Monthly took an unexpected step by beginning to record the affairs of Sheff students, sports, and societies, as well as printing lengthy student editorials. The move was disastrous. While the publication remained of interest to its writers and readers within the Sheff, its contents were fluff to everyone else. The Board of the twentieth volume changed the name to Yale Sheffield Monthly, solidifying the magazine’s altered focus. The arrogance and self-interest of the staff was clearly reflected in the contents of the magazine over the next few years. It all came to a self-defeating end, however, when the Monthly shut down after its twenty-fourth volume in 1918, due to lack of support from the student body. On its demise, a writer for the Yale Daily News wrote that “the purpose and scope of the Sheffield Monthly was never fully understood” and its “quality was never what it should have been.” The editors of the Monthly realized their error in documenting collegiate opinions and social activities in a publication intended for scientific writing. They aligned their stated editorial focus with the material they printed and joined forces with the beleaguered Yale Courant, the school’s first illustrated periodical (1865). By February 1919, the Yale Graphic was being published from the basement of Sheffield’s Byers Hall by former staff of the Sheffield Monthly and of the Courant. In its first issue, Chairman L. Staples explained: “With this issue, the Yale Sheffield Monthly and The Yale Courant erstwhile rivals, unite to publish The Graphic a fortnightly magazine which, we trust, will adequately fill the obvious place in the undergraduate world for an illustrated that will portray campus life as the camera records it.”

The Graphic was well-received at first, but within a few years it became clear that there was no variety to be found in subject matter, though the names of the students were changing. In addition, the quality and quantity of the literary works gradually decreased. Within five years of the publication’s beginning, it had become defunct. The name change proved an insufficient guise for the continued low quality of the content. No trace of the original Scientific Monthly was seen for three years.

In 1926, the Sheff senior class decided to revive the magazine in the manner in which it was originally intended, as a magazine devoted to the sciences at Yale. In 1927, this plan became a reality with the first issue of The Yale Scientific Magazine. In the first pages of the issue, there is a statement from the editors describing the magazine, and its new role at Yale: “The Yale Scientific Magazine, while published in the interest of science and engineering within the Sheffield Scientific School, will include accounts of the scientific accomplishments of Yale graduates. It will not cast its hat into the ring of campus controversies unless they shall lead to significant steps in the development of the school.”

The magazine was received surprisingly well, and 75% of graduate and Sheff students had subscribed by the time the first issue was printed, with a circulation of 1,900 magazines. Yale President James Rowland Angell commented that “The Yale Scientific Magazine is an admirable achievement which reflects great credit on the Sheffield Scientific School, and especially on the Board of Editors.” Sheff Dean Charles H. Warren expressed confidence that YSM would “serve as a medium through which the scientific work which is being done in the various departments of the University will be brought to the attention of a larger audience, receive a wider recognition, and awaken a greater interest in this important field of Yale’s intellectual life.

=== 1927–present ===
Since 1927, the magazine has stayed continuously in print, with few major changes in format. ("The" in the title was eliminated since 1952.) The content of the magazine, however, has changed to reflect the times. From 1927 until the mid 1960s, the majority of the feature articles were solicited from Yale faculty members rather than students. Many articles were also written by the chief executives of large-scale technical and engineering companies. There were also articles written by presidents of Yale, deans of the college and the Sheff, military officers, and political figures, such as the U.S. Surgeon General and the Secretary of Health. Yale Students ran all of the editorial and managerial affairs of the magazine and wrote news briefs and editorials.

This gradually changed, and by the later 1960s, students were writing all the articles and still running the other operations. The foci of the articles has varied with the times, and reflects Yale’s contribution to the sciences. The late 1920s and the 1930s concentrated on applied physics and engineering. The following decade was dominated by war-related sciences. The 1950s saw a revival of the applied physical sciences, culminating in the feverish space race. The 1950s also served as a prelude to the burst of biological studies in the 1960s, fueled by Jonas Salk’s polio vaccine, the elucidation of the DNA double helix by Watson and Crick, and other emerging techniques. In the late 1960s and early to mid-1970s, YSM concentrated on sciences related to the Vietnam War and in other heated social issues. This pathway culminated with the exploratory microanalytical studies in the natural sciences encountered in the last decade or so.

Today, Yale Scientific Magazine strives to narrow the gulf between the sciences and humanities at Yale, particularly by making science done at Yale accessible to a non-technical audience across campus and nationwide. True to its founding philosophy, the Yale Scientific Magazine has remained a platform for budding scientists to develop the art of written communication, and for non-scientists to learn about the cutting edge of science at Yale. Yale Scientific Magazine is largely supported by the Yale Science & Engineering Association, which provides a Yale alumni readership base and strategic partnerships in addition to financial support. In recent years, the magazine has extended operations to other modes of scientific communication, including outreach (Synapse), an online blog (The Scope), as well as webinars.

== Synapse ==
Synapse is the outreach team of YSM. Synapse regularly hosts competitions, conferences and events that are usually targeted at children and teenagers, to cultivate and support interest in science and journalism. The flagship programs of Synapse include Science on Saturdays, a lecture/demonstration series started in 2004 targeted at elementary/middle schoolers, and Resonance, an annual science conference for high schoolers. Synapse hosted virtual events in 2020 and 2021, including science seminars, professor lecture series, and a scholarship contest.

== The Scope ==
In 2015, YSM launched its blog page, The Scope, which aims to present topics and breakthroughs in science in a simpler, more interesting, and more personal manner.

== Recent Leadership ==
Year	Editor-in-Chief	Managing Editors	Production Manager	Publisher	Synapse President
2026	Asuka Koda	Michael Sarullo, Max Watzky	Melody Jiang	Mia Cooper	Gabriela Berger, Wyatt Aiken
2025	William Archacki	Mia Gawith, Evelyn Jiang	Madeleine Popofsky	Matthew Blair	Gabriela Berger, Mia Cooper
2024	Hannah Han	Sophia Burick, Kayla Yup	Kara Tao	Tori Sodeinde	Hannah Barsouk, Brandon Quach
2023	Alex Dong	Sophia Li, Madison Houck	Malia Kuo	Lucas Loman, Dinara Bolat	Hannah Barsouk, Sofia Jacobson
2022	Jenny Tan	Tai Michaels, Maria Fernanda Pacheco	Catherine Zheng	Jared Gould, Blake Bridge	Krishna Dasari, Lucy Zha
2021	Isabella Li	James Han, Hannah Ro	Ishani Singh	Jared Gould, Blake Bridge	Alice Zhang, Sophia Li
2020	Marcus Sak	Kelly Farley, Anna Sun	Antalique Tran	Sebastian Tsai	Michelle Barsukov, Katherine Dai
2019	William Burns	Conor Johnson, Sunnie Liu	Mafalda Von Alvensleben	Richard Li	Leslie Sim, Lisa Wu
2018	Eileen Norris	Diane Rafizadeh, Stephanie Smelyansky	Sunnie Liu	Kevin Chang	Jessica Trinh
2017	Chunyang Ding	Emma Healy, Sonia Wang	Eileen Norris	Dawn Chen	Stephanie Smelyansky
2016	Lionel Jin	Allison Cheung, Zach Gardner	Aviva Abusch	Kevin Hwang	Ruiyi Gao
