= Michelson–Morley Award =

The Michelson–Morley Award is a science award that originated from the Michelson Award that was established in 1963 by the Case Institute of Technology. It was renamed in 1968 by the newly formed Case Western Reserve University (CWRU) after the federation between the Case Institute of Technology and Western Reserve University. The award continued until 1992, and was re-established in 2002. The award in its various forms is named for physics professor Albert A. Michelson (Case School of Applied Sciences) and chemistry professor Edward W. Morley (Western Reserve University) who carried out the famous Michelson–Morley experiment of 1887.

== Recipients ==
Michelson Award

- 1963 – John Hasbrouck Van Vleck
- 1964 – Haldan Keffer Hartline
- 1965 – Luis W. Alvarez
- 1966 – Edwin H. Land
- 1967 – Martin Schwarzschild

Michelson–Morley Award

- 1968 – John Bardeen
- 1970 – Charles H. Townes
- 1976 – John D. Roberts
- 1977 – Gene M. Amdahl
- 1978 – Harry George Drickamer
- 1979 – Hans Liepmann
- 1980 – Frank Albert Cotton
- 1981 – Francis Crick
- 1982 – Michael Ellis Fisher
- 1983 – Subrahmanyan Chandrasekhar
- 1984 – Paul Lauterbur
- 1985 – Paul Fleury
- 1986 – Richard Zare
- 1987 – Robert H. Dicke and George A. Olah
- 1988 – John J. Hopfield
- 1989 – Herman F. Mark
- 1990 – Frederick Reines
- 1991 – John Cahn
- 1992 – Watt W. Webb
- 2002 – Frank Wilczek
- 2003 – Stephen Hawking

The 1987 award was jointly to a physicist and chemist to honour the centenary of the Michelson–Morley experiment.

== Sources ==
- Michelson–Morley Award Lecture (Case Western Reserve University)
- The Michelson Lectures and Awards, p. 339 of Physics at a Research University, Case Western Reserve 1830-1990 (2005) by William Fickinger, Professor Emeritus (Appendix D: Programs and Lecture Series)
- Happenings, The Scientist (1 June 1987)
