= Clyde Cowan =

American physicist (1919–1974)

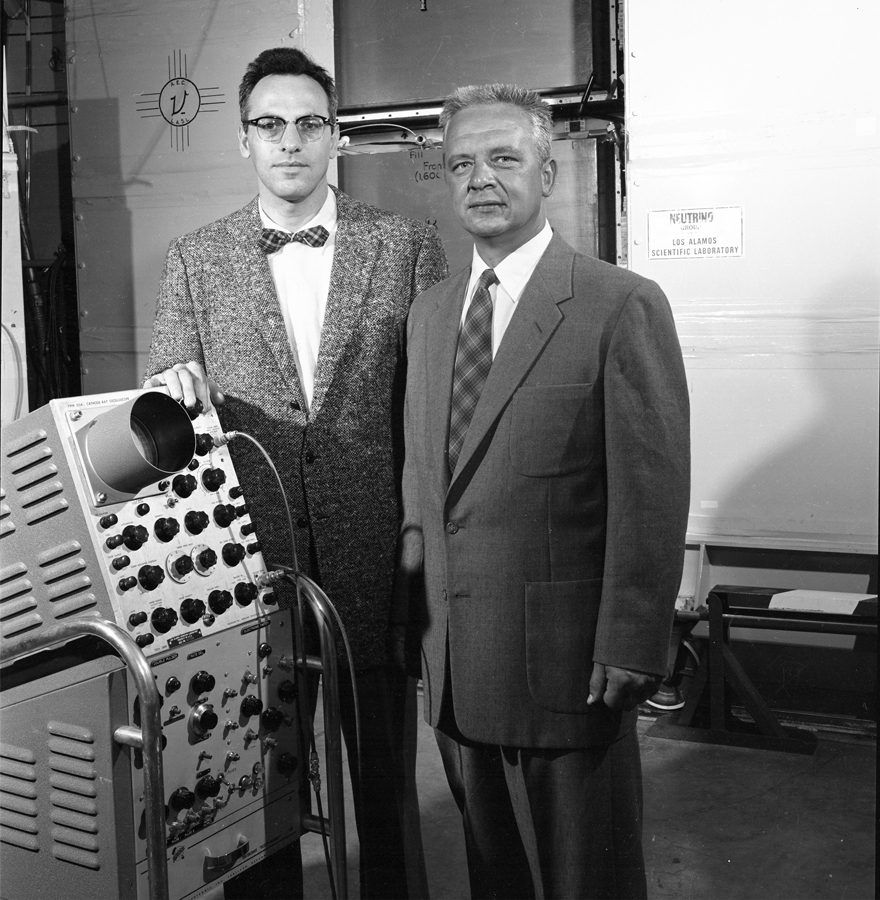
- Frederick Reines (left) with Cowan
- Born: December 6, 1919; Detroit, Michigan, United States
- Died: May 24, 1974 (aged 54); Bethesda, Maryland, United States
- Education: Washington University in St. Louis; Missouri School of Mines and Metallurgy
- Awards: Guggenheim Fellowship (1957)
- Scientific career
- Workplaces: The Catholic University of America

Clyde Lorrain Cowan Jr (December 6, 1919 – May 24, 1974) was an American physicist and the co-discoverer of the neutrino along with Frederick Reines. The discovery was made in 1956 in the neutrino experiment. Reines received the Nobel Prize in Physics in 1995.

== Early life ==
Born the oldest of four children in Detroit, Michigan, Cowan's family moved to St. Louis, Missouri, where he began his education attending public schools. While attending the Missouri School of Mines and Metallurgy in Rolla, Missouri, Cowan was Editor-in-Chief of the Missouri Miner newspaper from 1939–1940, and graduated in 1940 with a BS in chemical engineering.

== Military career ==
Cowan was a captain in the United States Army Air Forces, where he earned a bronze star in World War II.

From 1936–1940 he was in the Reserve Officers' Training Corps. Cowan joined the U.S. Army Chemical Warfare Service with the rank of Second Lieutenant when America joined World War II in 1941. In August 1942, he was transferred to Eighth Air Force stationed in London, England. In 1943 he designed and built an experimental cleaning unit to be used in case of gas attack. In the following year, he joined the staff of the British Branch of the MIT Radiation Laboratory, which was located in Great Malvern, England. In 1945 he was a liaison officer with the Royal Air Force, working to expedite transmittal of technical information and equipment. He returned to the United States in 1945, and worked at Wright Patterson Air Force Base in Dayton, Ohio. He left active duty in 1946.

== Academic career ==
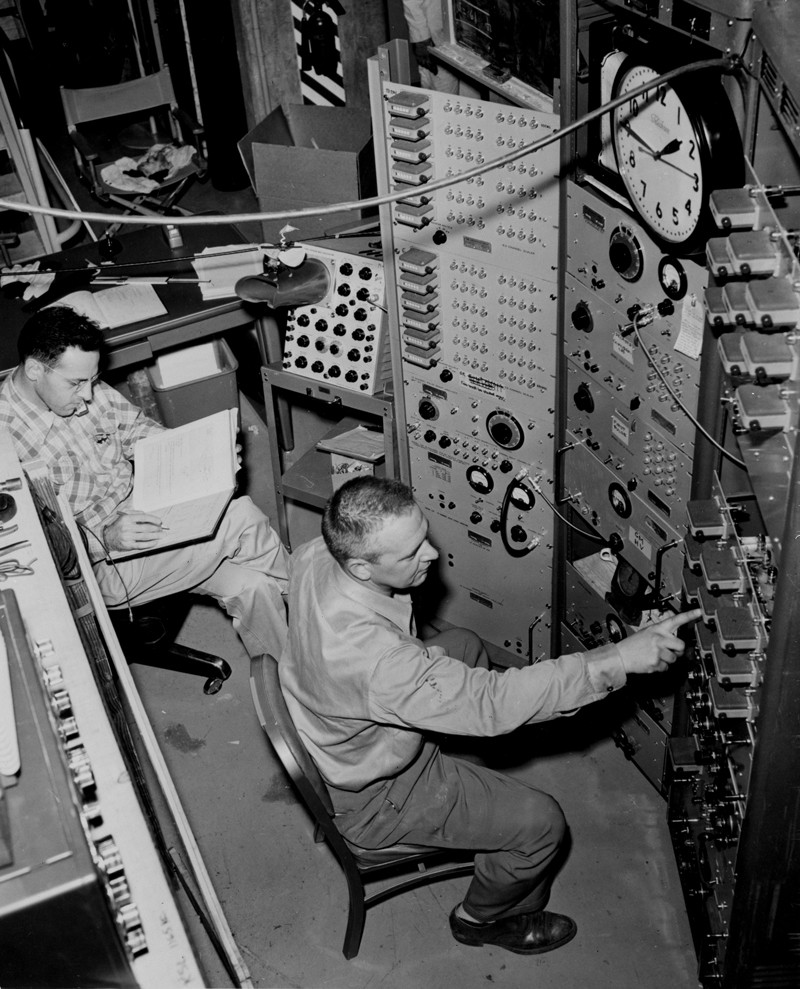
Frederick Reines, left, and Clyde Cowan, at the controls of the Savannah River neutrino experiment (c. 1956)

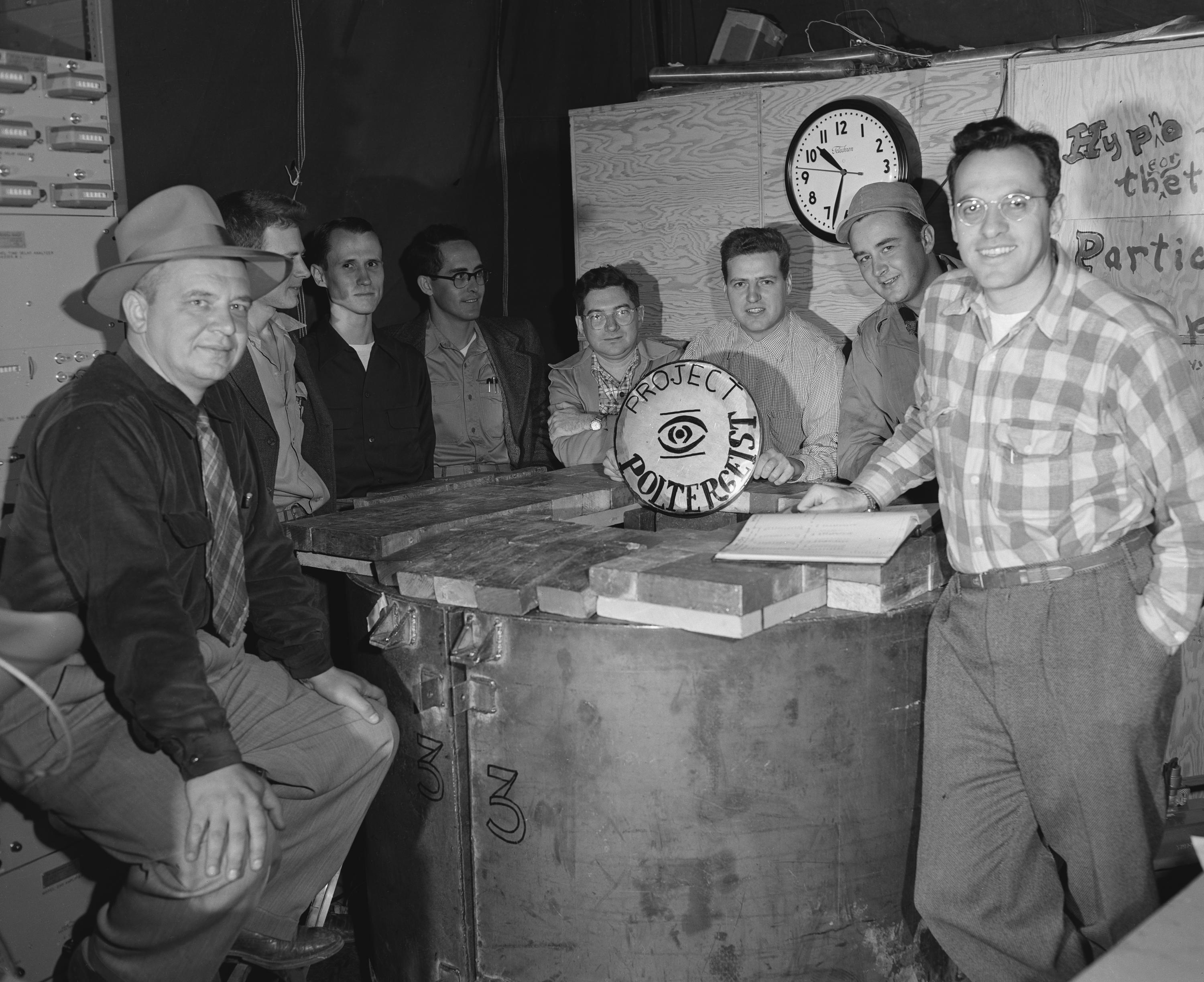
Frederick Reines (far right) with Clyde Cowan (far left) and other members of Project Poltergeist, 1953

Benefitting from the G.I. Bill, Cowan attended Washington University in St. Louis, Missouri, receiving a master's degree, and a PhD in 1949. He then joined the staff of the Los Alamos Scientific Laboratory in New Mexico, where he met Frederick Reines.

In 1951 Reines and Cowan began the Cowan–Reines neutrino experiment, in hopes of discovering the neutrino. Because the neutrino was hypothetically created through beta decay, the two men made use of the Savannah River Plant in Aiken, South Carolina, as their source of potential neutrinos. The pair, and their collaborators, collected data for months, and in 1956, concluded that they had certainly observed the neutrino, publishing their work in the July 20, 1956 issue of Science. Reines was later awarded the 1995 Nobel Prize in Physics for their work in this experiment. He alone received the award, because Cowan died in 1974, and Nobel Prizes are not awarded posthumously.

Cowan began his teaching career in 1957 as a Professor of Physics at George Washington University in Washington, D.C. The following year he left GWU and joined the faculty of The Catholic University of America in Washington, D.C., a post he held until the end of his life. He also acted at various times as a consultant to the U.S. Atomic Energy Commission (AEC), US Naval Ordnance Laboratory, the United States Naval Academy, the United States Army, United Mine Workers of America, Electric Boat Co., and the Smithsonian Institution, Washington, D.C.

Cowan died in Bethesda, Maryland of a sudden heart attack on May 24, 1974, and was buried in Arlington National Cemetery.

== Family ==
Cowan was married in Woodford, England, January 29, 1943 to Betty Eleanor, daughter of George Henry and Mabel Jane (Mather) Dunham of Wanstead, England. Seven of their children died in infancy. They had three surviving children. Cowan adopted two sons.

His grandson, James R. Riordon, a science journalist and a former physicist and engineer who heads the American Physical Society media relations office, initially conceived of the distributed computing project Einstein@home, which searches gravitational wave data for signals from massive rotating objects such as pulsars.

Cowan was a direct descendant of L. L. Langstroth, the "Father of Modern Beekeeping".

He was a devout Catholic and was a member of the Knights of Columbus.
