= William Crosby Marshall =

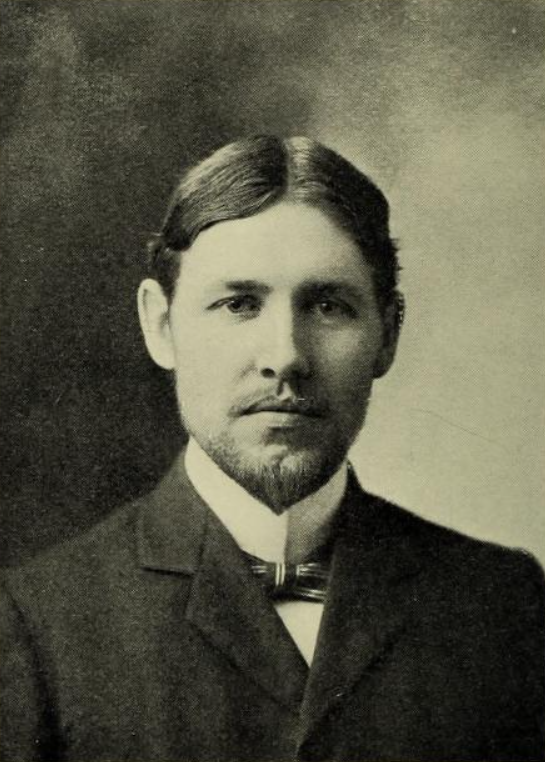
- Born: September 21, 1870; Avon, Connecticut
- Died: February 1, 1934 (aged 63); Wallingford, Connecticut
- Education: Sheffield Scientific School (M.E., 1893)
- Occupations: Engineer, professor, Author
- Known for: Elementary machine drawing and design, 1912

William Crosby Marshall (September 21, 1870 – February 1, 1934) was an American mechanical and consulting engineer, Professor of Machine Design and Descriptive Geometry at the Sheffield Scientific School of Yale University and author.

== Life and work ==
=== Youth and early career at Yale ===
Marshall was the son of Rev. Henry Grimes Marshall and Marietta (Crosby) Marshall. He grew up in Avon, Connecticut, where he attended the New Haven High School.

After some mechanical engineering course he started his career as structural engineer with the Berlin Iron Bridge Company in 1890. In 1893 he continued his studies at the Sheffield Scientific School, where he obtained his Master in Engineer in 1893. The next two years at Yale he was assistant in mechanical engineering and from 1894 to 1902 instructor in drawing and descriptive geometry. In 1902 at Yale Marshall was appointed assistant professor 1902–1912 and in 1912–13 professor in machine design.

In those years Marshall had continued his graduate study at the Sheffield Scientific School since 1895, and obtained his C.E. in 1900. In the years 1906–07 he had taken a sabbatical to study at the École d'Application du Gènie Maritime in Paris.

=== Further career in industry ===
At the age of 43 Marshall continued his career as consulting engineer in the Industry. He started in 1913 as construction engineer for the Federal Sugar Refining Co., and in 1915 became research engineer at the Bridgeport Works of the Remington Arms Union Metallic Cartridge Co. in Bridgeport, Connecticut.

In 1917 Marshall had started as mechanical engineer with the Holt Manufacturing Company in Peoria, Illinois, when on September 13, 1917, he was called upon to serve in the war industry. First he was Captain in Ordnance Department, U.S.A, and became assistant chief of the Inspection Division of the Small Arms Weapons Section at Washington, D.C. At the end of the war he was discharge February 19, 1919.

In 1919 Marshall went to Italy for six months as trade commissioner for the U.S. Department of Commerce on industrial machinery. Back in the States he again worked as mechanical engineer and consulting engineer for several companies for a shorter period of time: the National Spun Silk Company in New York; the U.S. Hoffman Machinery Company of Syracuse, where he was chief engineer; the Trexler Company of America at Wilmington, Delaware; Richard Hellman, Inc. at Long Island where he was maintenance and plant engineer, etc.

=== Works and memberships ===
In 1912 Marshall published his first work Elementary machine drawing and design in New York by McGraw-Hill, and in 1921 a second work on charts and graphs.

Marshall had been member of the American Society of Mechanical Engineers, member of the Society of Automotive Engineers and member of the Society for the Promotion of Engineering Education.

Marshall died February 1, 1934, in Wallingford, Connecticut.

== Publications ==
- Descriptive Geometry: For the Use of Students in Engineering at the Sheffield Scientific School of Yale University, Yale Co-operative Corporation, 1905.
- Descriptive Geometry for the Use of Students in Engineering, vol . 1. New Haven, 1909.
- Elementary machine drawing and design, New York, McGraw-Hill. 1911.
- Graphical methods for schools, colleges, statisticians, engineers and executives, New York, McGraw-Hill. 1921.

Articles, a selection

- Marshall, W. C. "A Review of "The Scientific Determination of the Merits of Automobiles" by Dr. A. Riedler." Transactions (Society of Automobile Engineers) 10 (1915): 417–443.
