= Yale Science & Engineering Association =

Alumni group at Yale that sponsors STEM activities

- Yale Science & Engineering Association, Inc.
- Formation: 1914; 112 years ago
- Type: not-for-profit membership organization
- President: Elissa Levy
- Executive Vice President: Milton Young
- Secretary: Gail Kalison Reynolds
- Treasurer: Joseph Cerro
- Website: ysea.org

The Yale Science & Engineering Association (YSEA) is the Yale University alumni organization focused on science, technology, engineering, and math (STEM). Founded in 1914 as the Yale Engineering Association, YSEA is one of the oldest university alumni organizations in the world. YSEA supports undergraduate research and entrepreneurship at Yale College and recognizes outstanding service, accomplishment and scholarship in STEM through the YSEA Annual Awards. YSEA was founded “to advance the interest of Engineering at Yale and prompt the better acquaintanceship and fellowship of Yale Engineers.” YSEA supports secondary school STEM education through its affiliations with FIRST Robotics and the International Science & Engineering Fair.

YSEA is a sponsor of the Yale Scientific Magazine, the nation's oldest college science publication and the premier science publication at Yale.

== History ==
The Yale Science & Engineering Association, Inc. traces its origin to the 34th annual meeting of the American Society of Mechanical Engineers (ASME) held December 2–5, 1913 in New York City at the Engineering Societies’ Building.

On the final evening of the ASME annual meeting, seven colleges (Stevens Institute of Technology, Worcester Polytechnic Institute, Polytechnic Institute of Brooklyn, Yale University, Kentucky State University, Brown University, and Cornell University) held alumni reunions at various locations throughout New York City. Twenty-nine Yale alumni attended the dinner given at the Yale Club of New York (at the time located at 30 West 44th Street, the current home of the Penn Club of New York). Professor Lester Paige Breckenridge, head of the Sheffield Scientific School, presided. At the dinner, plans were hatched to form a permanent Yale engineering alumni organization. A committee was appointed to consider the formation of a Yale Engineering Society, with an annual reunion to be a prominent feature.

One year later the Yale Engineering Association (YEA) was founded on December 4, 1914, at a meeting attended by 40 alumni. Membership was open to any Yale graduate although “the association naturally appeals more strongly to those who are engaged in engineering pursuits, transportation or manufacturing." Prior to the founding of YEA, alumni organizations primarily consisted of groups organized by class year or geographic designation. A circular outlining purposes and objectives was distributed to Yale graduates. Interest among Sheffield Scientific School alumni was high; membership neared 500 at the end of September 1915, two months before the first official meeting. Prior to its official founding in 1914, alumni and faculty of the Sheffield Scientific School had been interested in creating an organization devoted to the welfare of the Sheffield School.

The first meeting of the Yale Engineering Association was held in November 1915 in New Haven, CT. At the meeting several well-established industry professionals were elected to leadership positions. Edwin M. Herr, of Westinghouse Electric & Mfg. Company was elected president. Harry N. Covell, works manager of the Lidgerwood Mfg. Co., was elected vice-president and Richard T. Dana, a New York City-based consulting engineer, was elected secretary. The first meeting included one of the earliest demonstrations of transcontinental telephone communications, an event that was reported in the following issue of the “Yale Alumni Weekly”.
