= Sheffield Scientific School =

Former school of Yale University

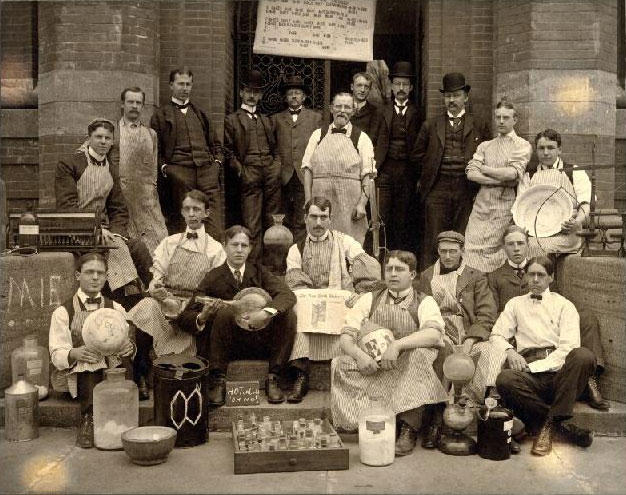
- Chemistry Class in 1898
- Type: Private
- Active: 1847–1956
- Affiliations: Yale University
- Location: New Haven, Connecticut, United States

Sheffield Scientific School was founded in 1847 as a school of Yale College in New Haven, Connecticut, for instruction in science and engineering. Originally named the Yale Scientific School, it was renamed in 1861 in honor of Joseph E. Sheffield, a railroad executive. The school was incorporated in 1871. The Sheffield Scientific School helped establish a model of American higher education which incorporated both the sciences and the liberal arts. Following World War I, its curriculum gradually became completely integrated with Yale College. "The Sheff" ceased to function as a separate entity in 1956.

== History ==
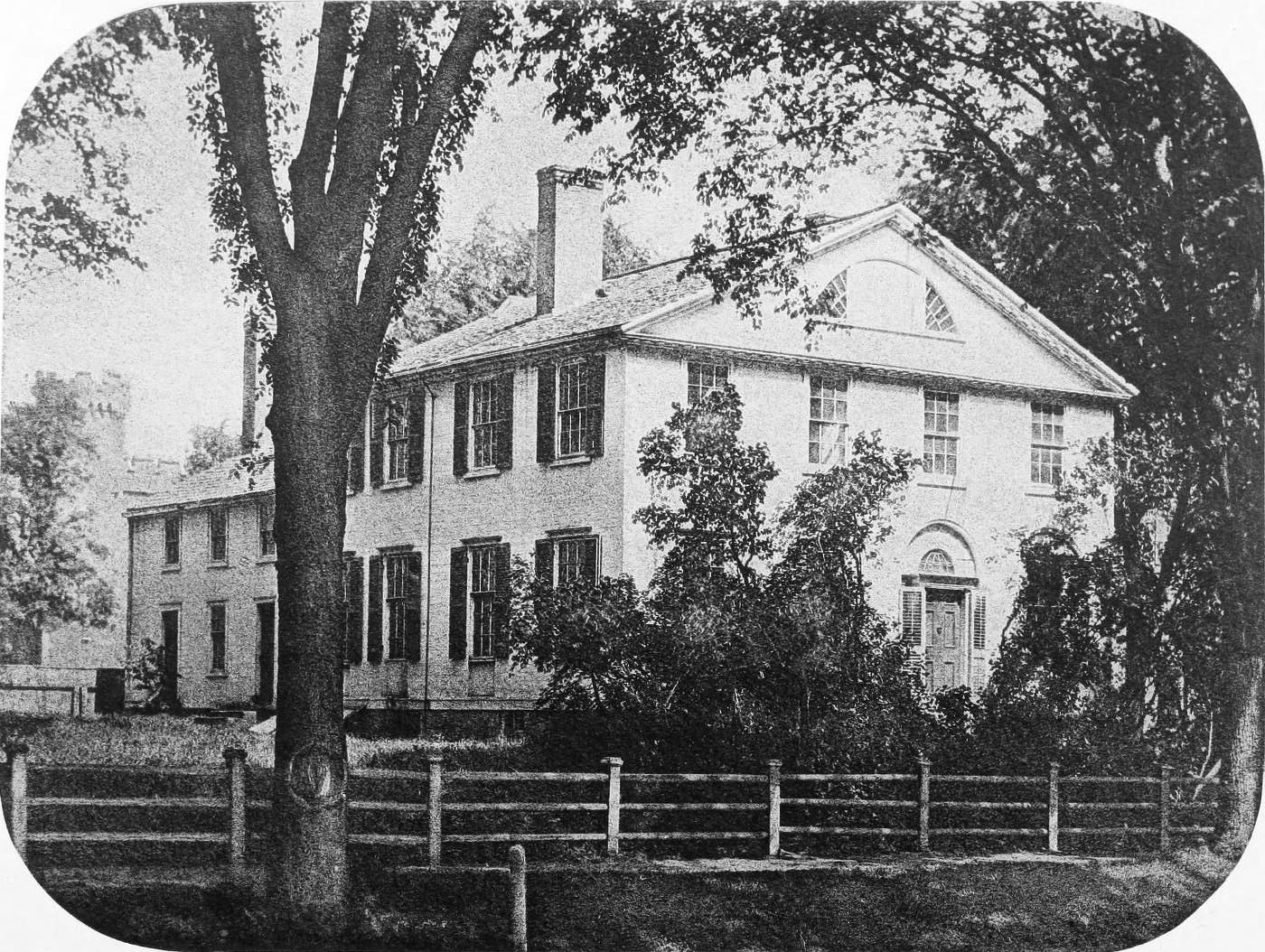
Second President's House, home to the Department of Philosophy and the Arts, 1847–1860

After technological developments in the early nineteenth century, such as the electric telegraph, an interest was fostered in teaching applied science at universities. Harvard established the Lawrence Scientific School in 1846 and Dartmouth began the Chandler Scientific School in 1852. The stage was set at Yale for the transition in education beginning in 1846, when professorships of agricultural chemistry (John Pitkin Norton) and practical chemistry (Benjamin Silliman Jr.) were established. In 1847, the School of Applied Chemistry became part of a newly created Department of Philosophy and the Arts (later, the Yale Graduate School). Classes and labs were hosted in the Second President's House on Yale's Old Campus until funding and a suitable facility could be found.

Norton died in 1852 and was followed by John Addison Porter. The professorship for applied chemistry was followed in 1852 by one for civil engineering, (William Augustus Norton) establishing a school of engineering. These programs made up the Yale Scientific School.

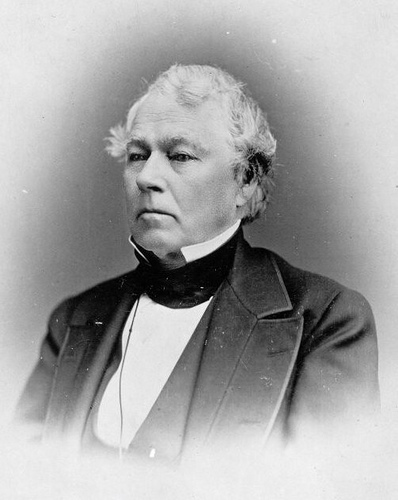
Joseph Earl Sheffield (1793-1882), the school's namesake

In 1853 and 1854, science and engineering courses were listed in the Yale College course catalog as offered by the Yale Scientific School. Porter elicited help from his father-in-law, Joseph Earl Sheffield (1793-1882), and in 1858, Sheffield donated over US$100,000 to purchase the old Medical Department building for the scientific school. This gift included two newly-renovated wings within the building. The old Yale Medical School building on the northeast corner of Grove and Prospect Streets was renovated and renamed (South) Sheffield Hall. (It was demolished in 1931 and was on the current site of Sterling Tower, Sheffield Hall and Strathcona Hall (SSS).) Sheffield's building reinforced the division of Hillhouse Avenue into an upper, residential section, and a lower section devoted to education. In 1861, the school became the Sheffield Scientific School.

Sheffield was one of Yale's greatest benefactors and continued to support the school throughout his life, giving a total of about US$500,000. Yale also received US$591,000 from his will as well as his house, the Sheffield mansion, designed and originally owned by Ithiel Town (demolished in 1957). The school also benefited from the Morrill Act starting in 1863 and an agricultural course was begun. Land grant status, however, was transferred to the Storrs Agricultural School in 1893 after arguments by the state grange that the school was not a proper "farm school".

== Education and student life ==
The Sheffield School innovated with an undergraduate course offering science and mathematics as well as economics, English, geography, history, modern languages, philology and political science. Sheffield also pioneered graduate education in the United States, granting the first Ph.D. in the United States in 1861 as well as the first engineering Ph.D. to Josiah Willard Gibbs in 1863, and the first geology Ph.D. to William North Rice in 1867.

Unlike Yale College students at the time, Sheffield students had "no dorms, no required chapel, no disciplinary marks and no proctors". The Academical Department of Yale (Ac) and Sheffield (Sheff) became rivals. Loomis Havemeyer, alumnus and registrar at Sheffield, stated: "During the second half of the nineteenth century Yale College and Sheffield Scientific School, separated by only a few streets, were two separate countries on the same planet." The Ac students studied liberal arts and would look down on the practical Sheff students.

Sheffield had its own student secret societies, including the Colony Club, 1848 (now Berzelius), the Cloister, 1863 (now Book and Snake), St. Anthony Hall, 1867 (now a 3-year society, also called Delta Psi), St. Elmo, 1889 (also a senior society), as well as Franklin Hall, 1865 (Theta Xi), York Hall, 1877 (Chi Phi), Sachem Hall, 1893 (Phi Sigma Kappa), and Vernon Hall, 1908 (now Myth and Sword). The Yale Scientific magazine was founded at Sheffield in 1894, the first student magazine devoted to the sciences.

== Other buildings ==
In 1872–73, Sheffield Scientific School's first new building, North Sheffield Hall was built, designed by Josiah Cleaveland Cady, on what had been the gardens of the Town-Sheffield mansion. This was followed by Winchester Hall (1892) and Sheffield Chemical (1894-5, J. Cleaveland Cady). Of these, only the latter, Sheffield Chemical, is still standing, renovated and renamed Arthur K. Watson Hall. Becton Laboratory (designed by Marcel Breuer, 1970) now stands on the site of North Sheffield and Winchester Halls (demolished in 1967). Further expansion brought Kirtland Hall (1902, Kirtland Cutter), Hammond Laboratory (1904, W. Gedney Beatty), Leet Oliver Hall (1908, Charles C. Haight), Mason Laboratory (1911, Charles C. Haight) and Dunham Laboratory (1912, Henry Morse; addition 1958, Douglas Orr), all still standing except Hammond which was razed in 2009 to make way for two new residential colleges.

== Reorganization ==
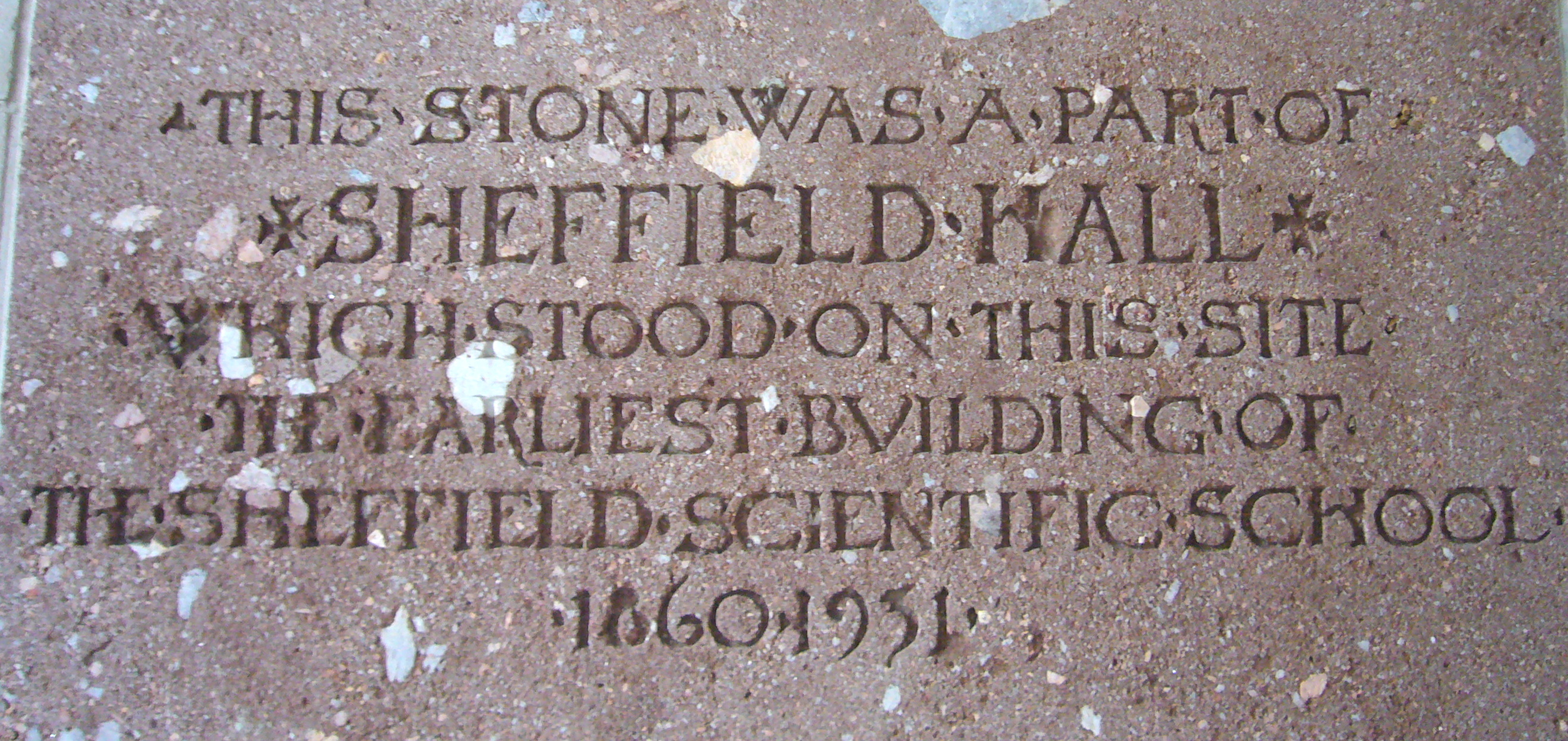
Plaque commemorating Sheffield Hall

During the 1918-1919 reorganization of the educational structure of Yale University, the three years "select" course at Sheffield Scientific School was eliminated and a four-year course of study for those studying "professional science" and "engineering" was approved, while graduate courses were transferred to the Graduate School, leaving only undergraduate courses taught at Sheffield Scientific School from 1919 to 1945, coexisting with Yale College's science programs. The centennial was celebrated in 1947 with the Silliman lectures given by Ernest O. Lawrence, Linus Pauling, W. M. Stanley and George Wells Beadle.

The first degree of Bachelor of Science was awarded in 1922 to the graduating class of the Sheffield Scientific School. In 1932, the School of Engineering was reestablished and Sheffield Scientific School engineering classes were transferred to the new school. In 1945, the Sheffield Scientific School resumed its original function of graduate level instruction in science. Undergraduate courses for the Bachelor of Science degree were transferred to Yale College, and undergraduate courses for a Bachelor of Science in industrial administration were transferred to the School of Engineering.

This transition occurred gradually, through the influence of "aggressive, powerful alumni" (including Edwin Oviatt, editor of the Yale Alumni Weekly) who "took control out of President Hadley's hands and forced a radical reorganization of Yale". In 1956, the Sheffield Scientific School was terminated as an active school. The Board of Trustees still exists to oversee the Sheffield Scientific School property and meet legal requirements. The school's faculty is defined as teachers of science to graduate students under the Division of Science. Engineering teaching and research is now conducted within the School of Engineering & Applied Science.

== Directors ==
- George Jarvis Brush (Professor of Mineralogy) from 1872 to 1898.
- Russell Henry Chittenden (Professor of Physiological Chemistry) from 1898 to 1922.
- Charles Hyde Warren (Sterling Professor of Geology) from 1922 to 1945.
- Edmund Ware Sinnott (Sterling Professor of Botany) from 1945 to 1956.

== Notable faculty ==
- Charles Emerson Beecher, paleontologist, member of the governing board
- William Henry Brewer, botanist, first chair of agriculture, as well as a graduate from the first class of the school
- Daniel Cady Eaton, botanist
- Daniel Coit Gilman, geographer, helped plan and raise funds
- Richard F. Humphreys (1911–1968), physicist and author, president of Cooper Union
- Thomas Lounsbury, American literary historian, professor of English and librarian at Sheff
- Chester S. Lyman (1814–1890), industrial mechanics; inventor of surveying and astronomical instruments
- William Crosby Marshall (1870-1934), Mechanical engineer, Professor of Machine Design and Descriptive Geometry and author.
- Lafayette Mendel, biochemist
- Mansfield Merriman (1848–1925), civil engineering; author of "A Treatise on Hydraulics and on the Strength of Materials", 1877
- John Pitkin Norton, chemist, faculty member of Yale's department of education in applied science, which gave rise to Sheffield Scientific School.
- William Augustus Norton, civil engineer, founding faculty member
- John Addison Porter, chemist
- Charles Brinckerhoff Richards, engineer chair of Mechanical Engineering from 1884–1909
- Benjamin Silliman Jr., chemist, founding faculty member
- William Petit Trowbridge (1828–1892), mechanical engineering; published the first cantilever bridge design; Member, National Academy of Science
- Addison Emery Verrill, zoologist and geologist
- Francis Amasa Walker, economist, third president of the Massachusetts Institute of Technology
- William Dwight Whitney, organized and taught in the department of modern languages; member of the governing board

== Notable alumni ==
- Joseph Wright Alsop IV (1876–1953), politician and insurance executive; father of Joseph Alsop
- Wilbur Olin Atwater (1844–1907), chemist known for his studies of human nutrition and metabolism
- Clifford W. Beers, mental health pioneer
- Jules Blankfein, Class of 1921, physician & financier; founder, Physicians' Hospital, New York; uncle of Lloyd Blankfein
- William Edward Boeing, aviator
- John Vernou Bouvier III, stockbroker and socialite; father of Jackie Kennedy, First Lady
- Chester Bowles, American politician
- Bradford Brinton, engineer; collector of fine Western art, which eventually resulted in the primary collection of The Brinton Museum
- J. Twing Brooks, U. S. congressman
- Malcolm Greene Chace (1875–1955), class of 1896. One of the founders of the Yale hockey team, American financier, textile industrialist, and tennis champion
- Henry Boardman Conover, ornithologist
- Arthur Louis Day, geophysicist and volcanologist
- Franklin M. Doolittle (1893–1979), Class of 1915, radio pioneer
- Charles Benjamin Dudley, chemist
- Isadore Dyer, physician
- Lee de Forest, electronics inventor
- Francis I. du Pont, chemist
- Pete Falsey, Major League baseball player
- Joseph W. Frazer, automobile magnate
- James Terry Gardiner, surveyor and engineer
- Josiah Willard Gibbs, mathematical physicist and physical chemist
- T. Keith Glennan, first NASA administrator
- Harold L. Green, chain store founder
- John Campbell Greenway, American mining and steel executive, General, U.S. Army
- Harry Frank Guggenheim, businessman, philanthropist
- John Hays Hammond, mining engineer, philanthropist, faculty member. He endowed a program at Sheff in mining and metallurgy and accepted a professorship. He contributed $100,000 for the construction of Hammond Laboratory, which is named for him.
- John Hays Hammond Jr., inventor, “father of radio control’’
- John Bell Hatcher, paleontologist
- Daniel Webster Hering, physicist
- Robert J. Huber, Michigan politician, businessman
- Tony Hulman (1924) businessman, owner of Indianapolis Motor Speedway 1945–1977
- Edward Hopkins Jenkins (1850–1931), agricultural chemist; director of the Connecticut Agricultural Experiment Station (1900–1923)
- Treat Baldwin Johnson, chemist
- Clarence King, American geologist and mountaineer
- Charles N. Lowrie, American landscape architect
- Duane Lyman, architect
- Othniel Charles Marsh, paleontologist
- Champion Mathewson, metallurgist
- Truman Handy Newberry, American businessman and politician
- Frederick E. Olmsted, forester
- Thomas Wharton Phillips Jr., U. S. Congressman
- William S. Reyburn, U.S. Congressman
- William North Rice, geologist and theologian
- Stanley Pickett Rockwell (1907), metallurgist and co-inventor of the Rockwell hardness test
- Pierce Schenck (1878–1930), business executive from Dayton, Ohio
- William Thompson Sedgwick, bacteriologist and public health scientist
- George B. Selden, lawyer and inventor
- Sidney Irving Smith, zoologist
- James Graham Phelps Stokes, philanthropist, publicist, and political activist
- Zhan Tianyou, Chinese railroad engineer, "father of China's railroad"
- Juan Trippe, founder and CEO of Pan American World Airways
- Yamakawa Kenjirō, Japanese samurai of Aizu Domain, member of Byakkotai, physicist, member of the House of Peers
- Thomas Yawkey, owner of the Boston Red Sox for 44 years

== See also ==
- Austin Cornelius Dunham - major early donor
