= William A. Norton =

American engineer, educator and author

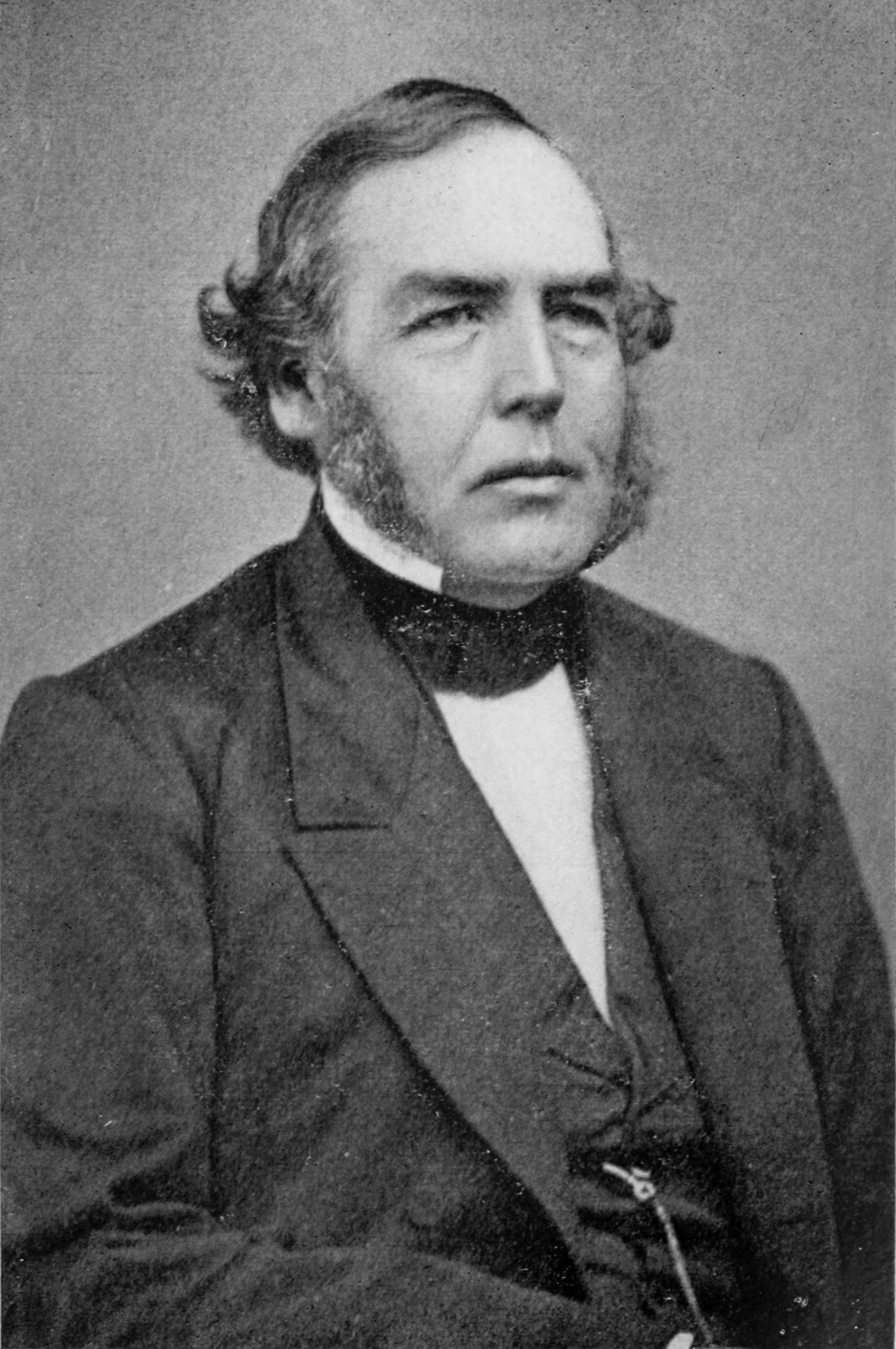
- Portrait of Norton at Yale College
- Born: William Augustus Norton; October 25, 1810; East Bloomfield, New York, U.S.
- Died: September 21, 1883 (aged 72); New Haven, Connecticut, U.S.
- Education: West Point Military Academy
- Occupations: Civil engineering professor and college president
- Employer(s): University of the City of New York; Delaware College; Brown University; Sheffield Scientific School
- Awards: Member, National Academy of Sciences

William Augustus Norton (October 25, 1810 – September 21, 1883) was a civil engineer and educator. He was the president of Delaware College and later a founding faculty member of the Sheffield Scientific School at Yale University.

Norton was born in East Bloomfield, New York. Norton graduated from the United States Military Academy at West Point, New York in 1831 and began his academic career there as assistant professor of natural and experimental philosophy. During this time, he also participated in the Black Hawk War. In 1833, he became professor of natural philosophy and astronomy at the University of the City of New York. In 1839, he moved to Delaware College as professor and then in 1850, became president. He had planned to turn the school into a scientific institution but was discouraged and left in 1850, to become professor of natural philosophy and civil engineering at Brown University. He was elected to the American Philosophical Society in 1844. In 1852, Norton moved to Yale College with his students to become the school's first professor of engineering, and became one of the founding faculty of the Sheffield Scientific School when it was founded in 1854. In 1873, he became a member of the National Academy of Sciences. He remained at Yale until his death in 1883.

While at the University of the City of New York, Norton completed a college astronomy textbook known as An Elementary Treatise on Astronomy (Wiley & Putnam, 1839), which was re-issued in four editions. He was also the author of the First Book of Natural Philosophy and Astronomy (1858).

== Publications ==
=== Textbooks ===
- Norton, William A. (1839). Elementary Treatise on Astronomy. New York: Wiley & Putnam.
- Norton, William A. (1859). First Book of Natural Philosophy and Astronomy. New York: A.S. Barnes & Burr.

=== Journal articles ===
- Norton, William A. (1847). "Terrestrial Magnetism". American Journal of Science. 2nd. IV.
- —— (1855). "Periodical Variations of the Declination and Directive Force of the Magnetic Needle". American Journal of Science.
- —— (1853). "Ericsson's Caloric Engine". American Journal of Science.
- —— (1859). "Donati's Comet. Two Memoirs". American Journal of Science.
- —— (1871). "Donati's Comet. Two Memoirs". American Journal of Science.
- —— (1864). "Molecular Physics. Two Memoirs". American Journal of Science. s2-38. doi:10.2475/ajs.s2-38.113.207. S2CID 219244454.
- —— (1872). "Molecular Physics. Two Memoirs". American Journal of Science.
- —— (1870). "Principles of Molecular and Cosmical Physics". American Journal of Science. 49 (145): 24–36. Bibcode:1870AmJS...49...24N. doi:10.2475/ajs.s2-49.145.24. S2CID 124417692.
- —— (1870). "The Corona Seen in Total Eclipses of the Sun". American Journal of Science. doi:10.2475/ajs.s2-50.149.250. S2CID 130024854.
- —— (1871). "Physical Constitution of the Sun". American Journal of Science. s3-1. doi:10.2475/ajs.s3-1.6.395. S2CID 130009797.
- —— (1873). "Dynamical Theories of Heat". American Journal of Science. 5 (27): 186–197. Bibcode:1873AmJS....5..186N. doi:10.2475/ajs.s3-5.27.186. S2CID 130998273.
- —— (1870). "Laws of the deflection of beams exposed to a transverse strain. Tested by experiment". Proceedings of the American Association for the Advancement of Science.
- —— (1870). "Physical theory of the principle of the lever". Proceedings of the American Association for the Advancement of Science.
- —— (1874). "Results of experiments on the set of bars of wood, iron, and steel, after transverse stress". Proceedings of the National Academy of Sciences. 11 (64): 284–290. Bibcode:1876AmJS...11..284N. doi:10.2475/ajs.s3-11.64.284. S2CID 130706976.
- —— (April 1870). "A succinct statement of the conclusions of the two papers". American Journal of Science.
- —— (1876). "Kesult of experiments on contact resistance". American Journal of Science. 11 (66): 442–446. Bibcode:1876AmJS...11..442N. doi:10.2475/ajs.s3-11.66.442. S2CID 131290356.
