= Boardman Conover =

American soldier and amateur ornithologist (1892–1950)

Henry Boardman Conover (January 18, 1892 – May 5, 1950) was an American soldier, salesman, and amateur ornithologist.

Conover was born in Chicago, the son of Charles Hopkins Conover and his wife Delia Louise Boardman. He attended The Hill School and then studied at the Sheffield Scientific School in Yale. He had an interest in natural history from an early age, and collected bird specimens. In 1920, he traveled to Venezuela with Wilfred Hudson Osgood on a collecting trip for the Field Museum of Natural History in Chicago. The trip inspired him to leave business and devote himself to ornithology, and they returned to South America in 1922, visiting Chile and Argentina. In 1926, Conover traveled to East Africa. Conover became, successively, an associate in ornithology, a life member in 1924, a patron in 1926, a contributor in 1930, a research associate in birds 1936, a trustee and corporate member in 1940, and a benefactor of the Field Museum in 1950.

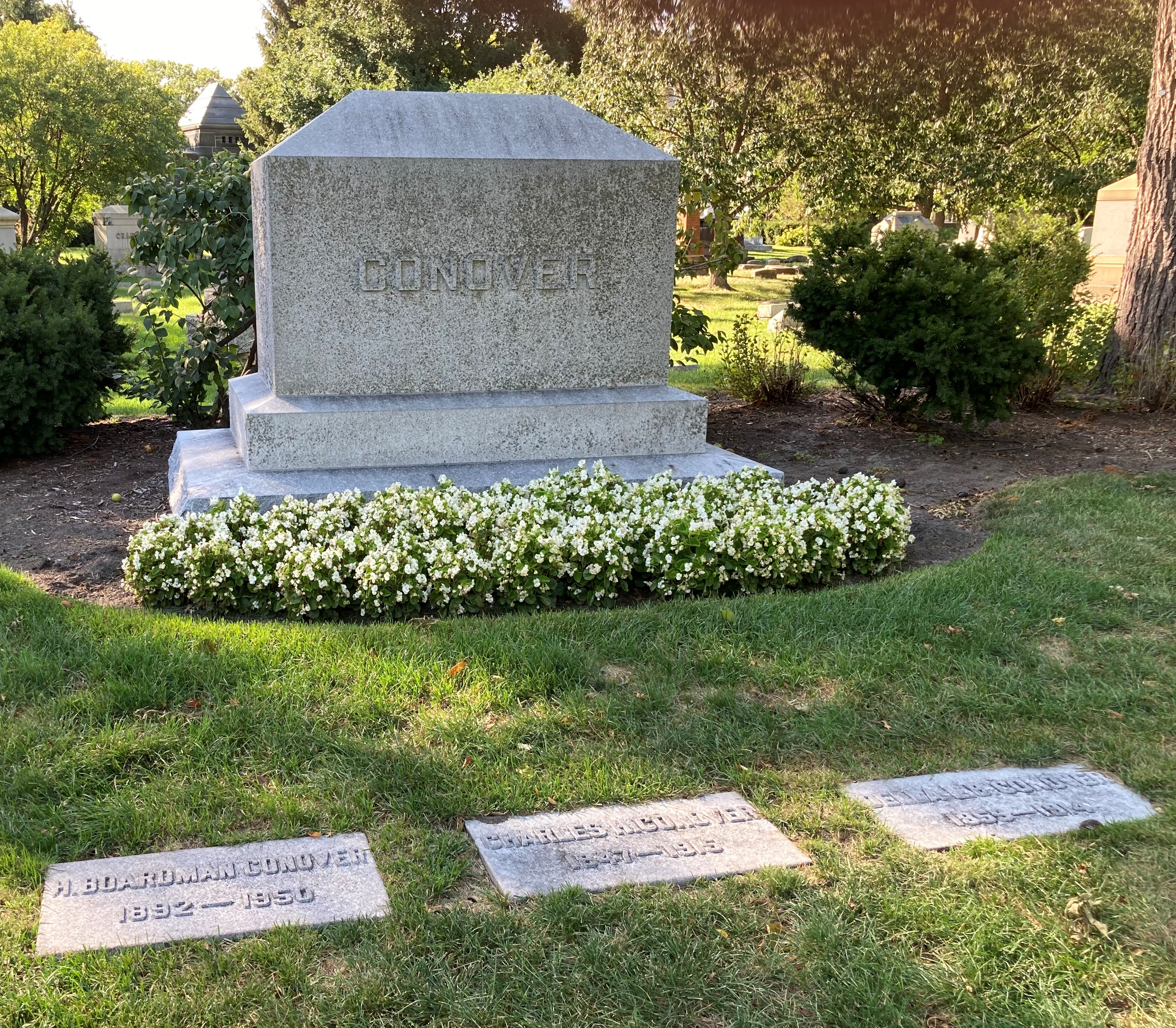
Conover's grave at Graceland Cemetery

Conover donated his collection of specimens, mostly game birds, to the Field Museum. It comprised 18,000, specimens including 30 types. He made a large number of contributions to Carl Eduard Hellmayr's The Catalogue of Birds of the Americas.

Conover was a member of the advisory council of Peabody Museum of Natural History, a trustee of the Chicago Zoological Society, and a fellow of the American Ornithologists Union.

He died, unmarried, in Chicago, of cardiac failure, and was buried in Graceland Cemetery.
