= Department of Physics (Yale University) =

Academic department of Yale University

The Yale Department of Physics is an academic department within Yale University for research and training in the field of physics. The department has two major academic programs, one for undergraduate education and a Ph.D.-granting graduate program. The department is housed in six locations on Science Hill and West Campus.

Yale University has a rich history in physics. Yale was among the first U.S. institutions to offer formal physics courses, pioneering research, and education in the field. In the late 1800s, Yale’s physics department gained prominence under Josiah Willard Gibbs, a Yale alumnus and one of the founders of thermodynamics and statistical mechanics. His work laid the groundwork for theoretical physics in the U.S. and significantly advanced Yale’s reputation. Edward Alexander Bouchet, the first African American to earn a Ph.D. from an American university and the sixth person in the U.S. to receive a Ph.D. in physics, graduated from Yale College in 1874 and earned his doctorate here two years later.

Throughout the 20th century, Yale became known for its work in experimental nuclear and particle physics. The department attracted top researchers and developed state-of-the-art facilities, such as the Wright Nuclear Structure Laboratory. Today, physics research at Yale is highly diverse that includes AMO, astrophysics, biophysics, condensed matter, nuclear, particle, and quantum science.

== History ==
=== Getting started in 1701 ===
The Collegiate School of Connecticut was founded in 1701 to educate male students for “Publick employment both in Church and State” in the Connecticut colony. As a college intent on supporting theocracy, Yale viewed natural philosophy an important part of the classical curriculum because the subject seemed to provide a way to see how God ordered the world. Works of Francis Bacon, Issac Newton, and John Locke became part of the natural philosophy, astronomy and mathematics curriculum. Observation and experiments were carried out using instruments that included telescopes, microscopes, and barometers. An orrery (clockwork model of the Solar System) spanning seven feet was designed by the college president Thomas Clap in 1743. In 1749, Benjamin Franklin donated a electrostatic machine.

=== 19th century: establishing liberal education and implementing research ===
After the American Revolution, Yale College presidents Ezra Stiles (president: 1778-1795), Timothy Dwight IV (president: 1795-1817), and their successors advocated a curriculum that would produce well-rounded and well-informed citizens. Science was an important part of the students’ learning.

Rapid industrialization accelerated scientific studies of heat and electricity and enabled other forms of research. Industrialists and financiers accumulated wealth directly or indirectly through enslaved labor, and used that wealth to support science. Yale benefitted from such patronage. The Sheffield Scientific School is an example: its chief patron Joseph Earl Sheffield was an anti-abolitionist who amassed his wealth through enslaved labor, such as through cotton exports in Alabama and investments in Cuba’s sugar cane plantations.

Research and science became increasingly salient at Yale as it became the first American institution to establish a graduate school in 1847: the Department of Philosophy and the Arts. Faculty members James Dana and John A. Porter saw to it that the Yale Scientific School became a separate entity operating under the Yale Corporation in 1854.

==== Sheffield Scientific School ====
The Yale Scientific School was renamed the Sheffield Scientific School in 1861 after Joseph Earl Sheffield, whose donations enabled the school to acquire new buildings, increase staff, and expand its curriculum. The “Sheff” became a model for many contemporary colleges in the late 19th century with a curriculum that incorporated engineering into the liberal education: for example, with drawing classes.

Students could complete an undergraduate degree in 3 years, earning a Bachelor of Philosophy (Ph.B) degree. Such an education model drew attention from China and Japan, and the Sheff paved the way for Yale to forge connections with Japan and China in the late 19th century.

==== Physics Club ====
On October 31, 1899, the first Physics Club was held, sponsored by Wright, Gibbs, and Hastings. Attendees took turn to report on the recent progress across all fields of physics, from radioactivity to general relativity. Prominent physicists, from Enrico Fermi to C.S. Wu have been invited. The meeting is held traditionally in Sloane Physics Laboratory, Room 57.

== People ==
=== Ph.D.s in physics ===
Beginning in 1861 with Arthur W. Wright, the Department of Philosophy and the Arts awarded Ph.D.s at Yale, the first of its kind in the U.S. After that, the number of physics doctorates gradually increased.

=== Black scholars and physics ===
Edward Alexander Bouchet was among the first Black graduates from Yale College and one of the first Black students to obtain a Ph.D. in the United States. In 1876, Bouchet was the sixth person to receive a PhD in physics at Yale, where his thesis was titled “On Measuring Refracting Indices.” Due to racial discrimination, Bouchet could not find a teaching or research post at other universities but taught at a segregated school, one of the few options available to educated Blacks. In 1905, Bouchet applied for a teaching position at Yale with a letter of recommendation from Arthur Wright, who vouched for Bouchet’s “excellent character, and marked ability” and saw him as “eminently well fitted for a Professorship in Physics and Chemistry.” However, Bouchet was denied the job.

It would not be until 1965 that Yale awarded a PhD in physics to another Black student, Joseph Johnson III. In 2006, Keith Baker became the department’s first tenured Black professor, and Larry Gladney became the second in 2019.

A portrait of Bouchet painted by Rudolph Zallinger in 1983 was unveiled in the Sterling Memorial Library in 1990.

In 2016, the American Physical Society recognized Bouchet's contributions to physics by designating the Old Laboratory, where he carried out his PhD research, as a historical site.

=== East Asian connection ===
Educators and reformers in China and Japan were particularly drawn to the Sheff’s liberal arts and practical curriculum which could be completed in just three years. Just as in Europe and the U.S., science and technology became the means by Asian countries to modernize and become militarily powerful.

After the Meiji Restoration, the Japanese government sent Yamakawa Kenjiro (1854-1931), who was from a prominent opposition samurai family, to the United States to enroll at the Sheff. Yamakawa majored in physics, graduated with a Ph.B. in 1875, and returned to Japan to become the country’s first Japanese physics professor.

Yung Wing (Yale Class of 1854), who was the first Chinese to graduate from an American university, persuaded China’s Qing government to form the Chinese Education Mission to send students to New England, and encouraged science and engineering in particular. The Sheff became one of the prime destination for Chinese students to study science and engineering. Zhan Tianyou (1861-1919) graduated from the Sheff in 1881, becoming the chief engineer of the Peking-Kalgan Railway (built 1905-09), the first railroad built in China without foreign involvement.

=== Gender and physics ===
Women students and scientists have slowly increased since admission of the first women graduate student in the early 1920s. However, the uneven playing field persisted after graduation. Gladys Anslow became faculty at her alma mater Smith College, distinguishing herself as teacher and spectroscopic research. She also held a prominent position at the Office of Scientific Research and Development during World War II. Flora Colpitts married fellow graduate student Joseph Henderson and the couple moved to University of Washington in Seattle. Due to anti-nepotism regulations, Colpitts never got a formal appointment despite teaching and researching. Despite her own accomplishments, Mary Wheeler was perennially associated with her husband, Eugene Wigner, while her work went largely unheralded.

Today, following decades of advocacy by department members, Yale’s Physics Department is more diverse than the average physics department in the US.

== Notable alumni ==
- Ernest O. Lawrence (1901–1958): Ph.D. 1925, advisor: W.F.G. Swann, Ph.D. thesis: “The Photo-electric Effect in Potassium Vapor as a Function of the Frequency of the Light”. Inventor of cyclotron, received 1939 Nobel Prize in Physics.
- Gladys Anslow (1892-1969): Ph.D. 1924, advisor: A.F. Kovarik, Ph.D. thesis: “Total Ionization Produced in Air by Electrons of Various Energies”. Professor at Smith College. First women speaker at the Physics Club in 1924.
- Flora E. Colpitts Henderson (1901-1984): Ph.D. 1927, advisor: W.F.G. Swann, Ph.D. thesis: “A Determination of the Limit of the Number of Free Electrons in a Metal in the Form of a Thin Film”.
- Mary A. Wheeler Wigner (1901-1977): Ph.D. 1932, advisor: L.W. McKeehan, Ph.D. thesis: “The Magnetic Susceptibilities of Alpha and Beta Manganese”. Professor at Vassar College and Rutgers University.
- David M. Lee: Ph.D. 1959, advisor: H. Fairbank, Ph.D. thesis: “The Thermal Conductivity and the Density of Liquid He3”. Nobel Prize in Physics 1996 for “discovery of superfluidity in helium-3”.
- Sukeyasu Steven Yamamoto: Class of 1955, Ph.D. 1959, advisor: F. Steigert, High energy experiment with bubble chamber. After retiring from active physics research, used bilingual and bicultural background to serve the research community at RIKEN in Japan.
- Joseph P. Allen: Ph.D. 1965, advisor: D. A. Bromley, NASA Astronaut: flights STS-5 (1982, Columbia) STS-51-A (1984, Discovery)
- Joseph A. Johnson III (1940-2017): Ph.D. 1965, advisor: H. Kraybill, Turbulence in plasmas; professor at Rutgers, City College of New York, Florida A&M. Founding member of National Society of Black Physicists (1977), Bouchet Leadership Award Medal (2016).
- Richard Hatch: M.Phil. 1981, "Deceptionist" (magician)

== Department chairs ==
- John Zeleny: 1915–40
- William W. Watson: 1940–61
- Vernon W. Hughes: 1961–67
- Robert K. Adair: 1967–70
- D. Allan Bromley: 1970–77
- Jack Sandweiss: 1977–80
- Frank W.K. Firk: 1980–83
- Thomas W. Appelquist: 1983–89
- Michael E. Zeller: 1989–95
- Charles Baltay: 1995–2001
- Ramamurti Shankar: 2001–07
- Meg Urry: 2007–13
- Paul L. Tipton: 2013–19
- Karsten Heeger: 2019–25
- Sarah Demers: 2025–

== Spaces and buildings ==
As physics became more distinct from other fields of science and increasingly involved laboratory work, professors wanted a dedicated space. The “Old Laboratory,” which was located in Vanderbilt Hall, became inadequate with increasingly sophisticated lab instruments, and more space was needed.

Sloane Laboratory opened in 1883 for physics research and teaching purposes. Brothers and Yale alumni Henry and Thomas Sloane donated $50,000 (equivalent to about $1.6 million in 2025) to construct the building. Sloane Laboratory was located in today’s Jonathan Edwards and Branford Colleges. The nearby Kent Laboratory for chemistry was built a few years later.

Higher enrollment and more hiring also galvanized the search for more space. With another generation donation from the Sloane brothers, the Sloane Physics Laboratory in its current location was dedicated in 1912.

The Sheff had their own school buildings: the Joseph Sheffield donation enabled Yale to construct a new building at the corner of Grove and Prospect (across from the Grove Street Cemetery).

These spaces enabled the physics faculty to spend more time in their research and contributed to the increasing specialization of science fields.

- Bass Center for Molecular and Structural Biology
- Becton Engineering and Applied Science Center
- Kline Tower
- Sloane Physics Laboratory
- Yale Science Building
- Yale Wright Laboratory
- Yale West Campus

== Yale physics research in on-campus centers and institutes ==
- Energy Science Institute
- Institute for the Foundations of Data Science
- Quantitative Biology Institute
- Systems Biology Institute
- Wu Tsai Institute
- Yale Center for Astronomy and Astrophysics
- Yale Center for Research Computing
- Yale's Integrated Graduate Program in Physical and Engineering Biology
- Yale Quantum Institute
- Yale Wright Laboratory

== See also ==
- List of computational physics software
- Sheffield Scientific School
- Yale Science Hill
- Yale University
- Yale Wright Laboratory
