= Reina Maruyama =

Japanese–American experimental physicist

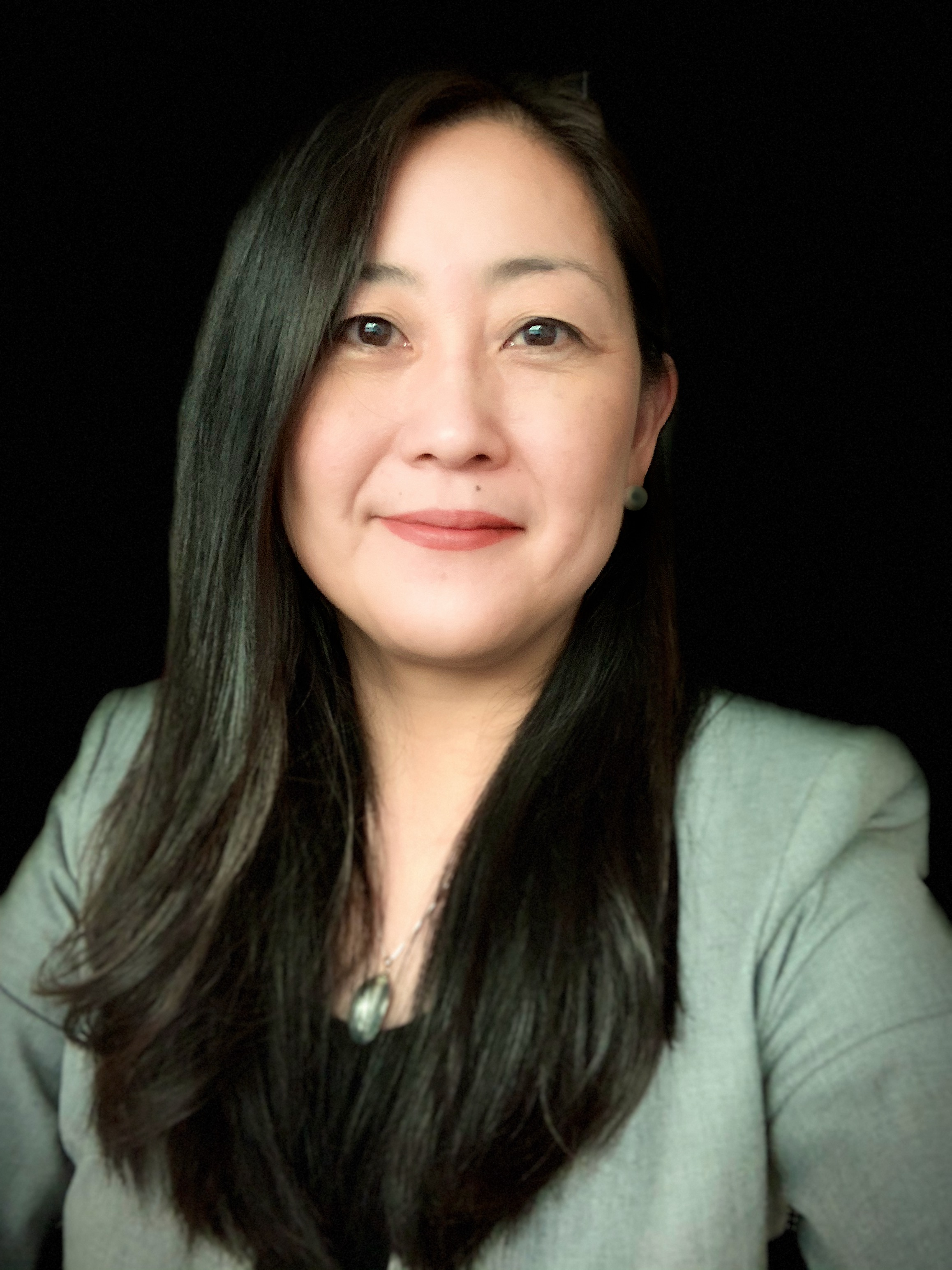
- Maruyama in 2021
- Born: Japan
- Known for: COSINE-100, HAYSTAC, CUORE
- Spouse: Karsten Heeger (m. 2004)
- Awards: APS Fellow (2020); Sloan Research Fellowship; NSF CAREER Award

Academic background
- Education: BSc, applied physics, 1995, Columbia University; Ph.D., physics, 2003, University of Washington
- Thesis: Optical trapping of ytterbium atoms (2003)

Academic work
- Institutions: Yale University; University of Wisconsin–Madison
- Website: maruyama-lab.yale.edu

Reina H. Maruyama is a Japanese–American experimental physicist and Professor of Physics and Astronomy at Yale University, where she is a member of the Yale Wright Laboratory and the Yale Quantum Institute. Her research focuses on the direct detection of dark matter, the search for neutrinoless double-beta decay, and the development of quantum sensing technologies for fundamental physics. She was elected a Fellow of the American Physical Society in 2020 for her "innovative and wide-ranging contributions to the experimental study of rare events and fundamental symmetries, especially the search for neutrinoless double beta decay, and for leadership in understanding the signature and nature of dark matter."

== Early life and education ==
Maruyama was born to parents Yoshiko and Toru Maruyama in Japan. Her family moved to New Canaan, Connecticut when she was 12 years old. She graduated with a Bachelor of Science degree in Applied Physics from Columbia University in 1995 and received her PhD in physics from the University of Washington in 2003, with a thesis on optical trapping of ytterbium atoms. She then joined Stuart Freedman's group at the University of California, Berkeley and Lawrence Berkeley National Laboratory as a Chancellor's Postdoctoral Fellow.

== Career ==
Maruyama joined the faculty at the University of Wisconsin–Madison (UW) in 2011. During her time at UW, she was involved in the construction and commissioning of the IceCube detector at the South Pole, a gigaton-scale particle detector that observes neutrinos interacting with the Antarctic ice. She contributed to the IceCube collaboration's 2013 observation of high-energy extraterrestrial neutrinos, published in Science. She also initiated DM-Ice, a prototype sodium iodide dark matter detector deployed at the South Pole, designed to test the annual modulation signal claimed by the DAMA/LIBRA experiment.

Maruyama joined Yale University as an Assistant Professor of Physics in July 2013. Prior to leaving UW, she was named the Woman Physicist of the Month by the American Physical Society (APS) Committee on the Status of Women in Physics. She was promoted to Associate Professor with tenure and subsequently to Professor of Physics and Astronomy. She holds a joint appointment in the Yale Department of Astronomy and is a member of the Wright Laboratory and the Yale Quantum Institute.

== Research ==
Maruyama's research program spans dark matter detection, neutrino physics, and quantum sensing. She leads or holds key roles in several major experiments based at the Wright Laboratory at Yale and at underground laboratories internationally.

=== COSINE-100 ===
Maruyama is the principal investigator and co-spokesperson of the COSINE-100 experiment, located at the Yangyang Underground Laboratory in South Korea. COSINE-100 was designed to directly test the long-standing dark matter claim by the DAMA/LIBRA collaboration using the same target material—thallium-doped sodium iodide crystals. The experiment grew out of the DM-Ice program that Maruyama initiated at the South Pole. The first results, published in Nature in 2018, found no excess signal attributable to dark matter. A combined analysis of COSINE-100 and ANAIS-112 data subsequently excluded the DAMA/LIBRA annual modulation signal at a significance of 5.3σ.

=== HAYSTAC ===
Maruyama is a co-PI of the Haloscope At Yale Sensitive to Axion CDM (HAYSTAC) experiment, which searches for axion dark matter using a tunable microwave cavity coupled to quantum-limited amplifiers. In 2021, the HAYSTAC collaboration demonstrated for the first time the use of quantum squeezing to enhance the sensitivity of an axion dark matter search, with results published in Nature. HAYSTAC is one of only two fundamental physics experiments—alongside LIGO—operating at noise levels low enough to employ quantum squeezing.

=== ALPHA ===
Maruyama is the deputy spokesperson of the Axion Longitudinal Plasma Haloscope (ALPHA) experiment, also located at the Wright Laboratory. ALPHA employs a plasma haloscope to extend the search for axion dark matter to higher masses than accessible by conventional cavity haloscopes. The experiment is funded by the Gordon and Betty Moore Foundation, the Simons Foundation, the Alfred P. Sloan Foundation, and the John Templeton Foundation.

=== CUORE and CUPID ===
Maruyama is a co-PI of the Cryogenic Underground Observatory for Rare Events (CUORE) experiment and its successor CUPID, located at the Laboratori Nazionali del Gran Sasso in Italy. CUORE searches for neutrinoless double-beta decay of ^{130}Te using a tonne-scale array of nearly 1000 cryogenic calorimeters operated at millikelvin temperatures. In 2025, the collaboration published its largest dataset—over 2 tonne·years of TeO_{2} exposure—in Science, placing a lower limit on the half-life of neutrinoless double-beta decay at T_{1/2} > 3.5 × 10^{25} years (90% C.I.).

== Awards and honors ==
- Fellow of the American Physical Society (2020)
- Fellow, Connecticut Academy of Science and Engineering (2021)
- Sloan Research Fellowship
- NSF CAREER Award (2012)
- Yale Public Voices Fellowship
- APS Woman Physicist of the Month (June 2013)
- Chancellor's Postdoctoral Fellowship, University of California, Berkeley

== Personal life ==
Maruyama married physicist Karsten Heeger, Eugene Higgins Professor of Physics and Director of the Wright Laboratory at Yale, in 2004.
