= Yale Graduate School of Arts and Sciences =

Graduate school of Yale University in New Haven, Connecticut, U.S.

Coordinates: 41.31229°N 72.92911°W

- Coat of arms of the school
- Type: Private Graduate school
- Established: 1847; 179 years ago
- Parent institution: Yale University
- Dean: Lynn Cooley
- Academic staff: 900
- Students: 2,860
- Location: New Haven, Connecticut, United States
- Website: gsas.yale.edu

The Yale Graduate School of Arts and Sciences is the graduate school of Yale University, a private Ivy League research university in New Haven, Connecticut, United States. Founded in 1847, it is the oldest graduate school in North America, and was the first North American graduate school to confer a Doctor of Philosophy (Ph.D.) degree.

The Graduate School is one of twelve constituent schools of Yale University and the only one that awards the degrees of Doctor of Philosophy, Master of Philosophy, Master of Arts, Master of Science, and Master of Engineering. While doctoral programs are also available in five of Yale's professional schools, students are enrolled through the graduate school, which confers their degrees. The school is administered in four divisions—Humanities, Social Sciences, and Biological and Physical Sciences—and its faculty are divided into 52 departments and programs. Nineteen of these programs terminate with the master's degree.

The Graduate School enrolls approximately 2,800 students, one-third of whom come from outside the United States. Approximately 900 faculty are involved with the graduate students as teachers, mentors, and advisors. Most of these faculty also teach in Yale College, the undergraduate school of the university.

== History ==
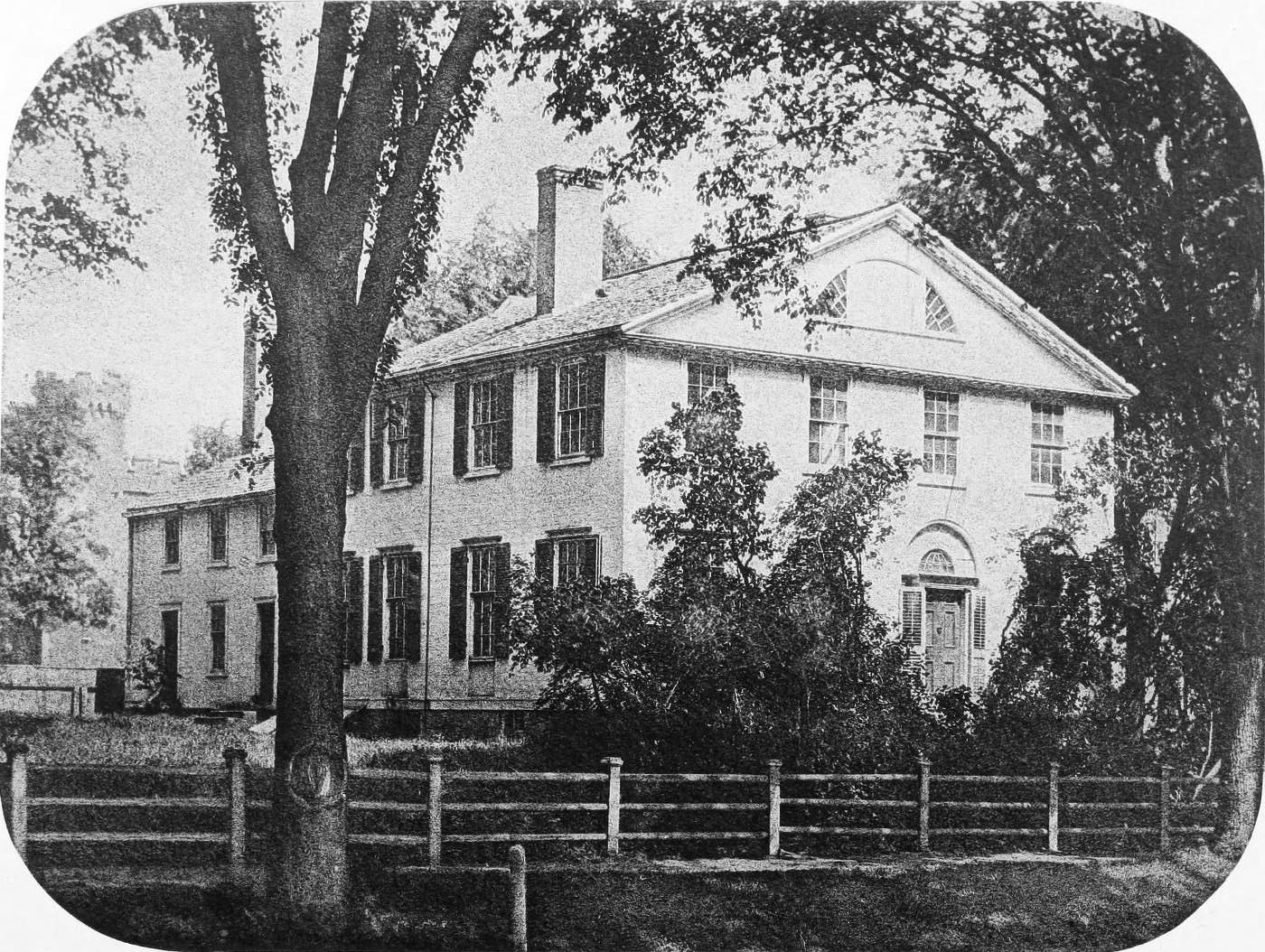
Second President's House, home to the Department of Philosophy and the Arts, 1847–1860

Established by an act of the Yale Corporation in August 1847, the Graduate School of Arts and Sciences was originally called the "Department of Philosophy and the Arts" and enrolled eleven students who had completed four-year undergraduate degrees. The department was also the precursor of the Sheffield Scientific School, which was cleaved from the department in 1854. The program offered seminars in chemistry and metallurgy, agricultural science, Greek and Latin literature, mathematics, philology, and Arabic. The faculty consisted of two full-time science professors, chemists Benjamin Silliman, Jr. and John P. Norton, and five Yale College faculty members who offered advanced courses in their subject areas.

Following the model of German research universities, the Scientific School faculty established a Doctor of Philosophy degree in 1860. At Commencement in July 1861, the school awarded the first three Ph.D.'s in North America to Eugene Schuyler (philosophy and psychology), Arthur Williams Wright (physics), and James Morris Whiton (classics). NYU's School of Practical and Analytical Chemistry, the University of Pennsylvania, Harvard University, and Princeton University established similar programs over the next two decades.

In 1892, seven years after Yale organized as a university, the Graduate School of Arts and Sciences was officially formed, and Arthur Twining Hadley was appointed dean. Hadley became Yale's 13th president in 1899. In 1920, the Graduate School was assigned its own governing board, and under Dean Wilbur Lucius Cross (1916-1930), it attracted a large and distinguished scholarly faculty.

Beginning in the late nineteenth century, race and gender restrictions on graduate admissions were gradually relaxed. In 1876 Edward Alexander Bouchet (Yale B.A. 1874) received a doctorate in Physics, becoming the first African American to earn a Ph.D. in the United States and the sixth recipient of a doctorate in the field. Women were admitted into the Graduate School in 1892. In 1894, seven women received Ph.D.s from Yale, including Mary Augusta Scott (English), Laura Johnson Wylie (English), Elizabeth Deering Hanscom (English), Margaretta Palmer (Mathematics), Charlotte Fitch Roberts (Chemistry), and sisters Cornelia H. B. Rogers (Romance Languages and Literatures) and Sara Bulkley Rogers (History).

== Organization ==
=== Faculty and administration ===
Most Graduate School faculty are members of the Yale Faculty of Arts and Sciences, the largest faculty of the university's schools and the same faculty body that governs the Yale College curriculum. The Faculty of Arts and Sciences is organized into 40 departments, which administer the Graduate School's four divisions: Humanities, Social Sciences, Biological Sciences, and Physical Sciences. Some members of Yale's professional school faculties are also members of the Graduate School faculty, which permits them to advise doctoral candidates.

A Dean of the Graduate School, appointed by the Yale Corporation, is the school's chief administrator. The position is currently held by geneticist Lynn Cooley.

=== Degree programs ===
The Graduate School administers 75 degree-granting programs. 56 of these programs grant Ph.D.s., while 19 terminate in master's degrees. It also offers joint-degree programs with several of Yale's professional schools, as well as opportunities for advanced non-degree study.

== Facilities ==
=== Research facilities ===
Yale's facilities for research and study include a university library system of nearly fifteen million volumes, the Beinecke Rare Book and Manuscript Library, the Yale University Art Gallery, the Yale Center for British Art, the Humanities Quadrangle, the Office of Information Technology Services, departmental libraries and collections, and the extensive resources of the professional schools. The collections and services of the Research Libraries Group, which consists of Columbia, Harvard, and Yale universities and the New York Public Library, are also available to students.

Special research facilities for the sciences are clustered on Science Hill, including the Bass Center for Molecular and Structural Biology, Josiah Willard Gibbs Research Laboratories, Kline Geology Laboratory, Sterling Chemistry Laboratory, Kline Biology Tower, the Class of 1954 Environmental Science Center, the Peabody Museum of Natural History, and the Arthur W. Wright Nuclear Structure Laboratory. Becton Engineering and Applied Science Center and Arthur K. Watson Hall for computer science are located on the former campus of the Sheffield Scientific School. Other laboratory facilities, like the Boyer Center for Molecular Medicine, are found at the Yale School of Medicine and the university's West Campus.

=== Office of International Affairs ===
The Office of International Affairs serves as an administrative resource to support the international activities of all schools, departments, offices, centers, and organizations at Yale. It tries to promote Yale and its faculty to international audiences and increase the visibility of Yale's international activities around the globe.
