= Science Hill (Yale University) =

Area of the Yale University campus

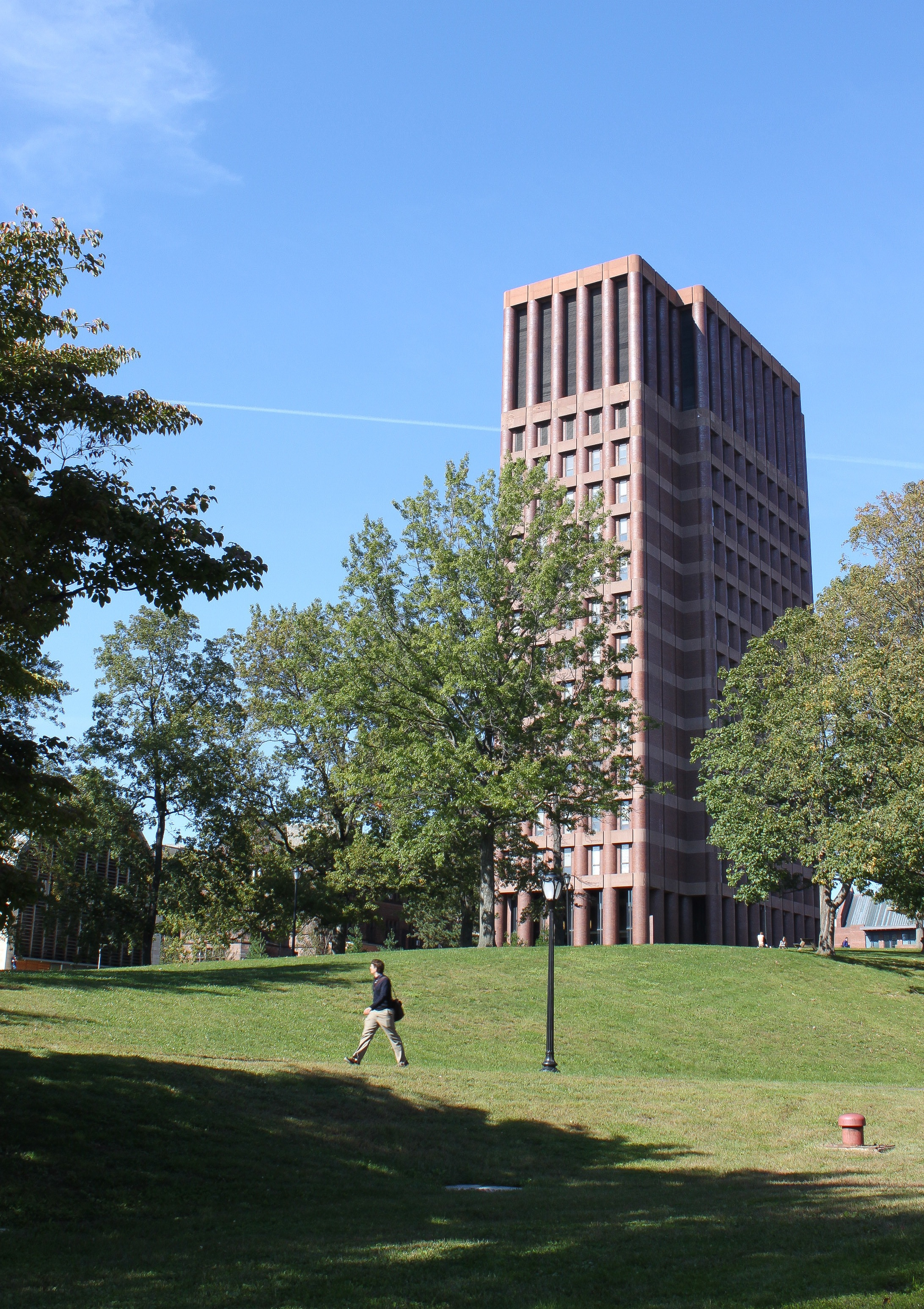
- Kline Biology Tower, Yale's tallest building, from Sachem Street

Highest point
- Elevation: 150 ft (46 m)
- Coordinates: 41.3173°N 72.9220°W

Naming
- Etymology: Devoted to physical and biological sciences

Geography
- Location within Connecticut
- Location: New Haven, Connecticut

Geology
- Rock age: Wisconsinan glaciation
- Mountain type: Planning precinct
- Rock type: Sandstone drumlin

Science Hill is an area of the Yale University campus primarily devoted to physical and biological sciences. It is located in the Prospect Hill neighborhood of New Haven, Connecticut.

Originally a 36-acre residential estate known as Sachem's Wood, it was purchased by Yale in 1910 as a land bank. To expand the former Sheffield Scientific School, the hill was allocated to large science laboratories and the main buildings of the Yale School of Forestry & Environmental Studies. Several laboratory buildings were completed in the 1910s, but most of the campus was completed during the build-up of scientific research after World War II.

== Geography ==
The topography of present-day Science Hill was primarily formed during the Wisconsinan glaciation. The Laurentide Ice Sheet flattened the soft sandstone of New Haven Harbor but had less effect on its surrounding, hard trap rock formations like East Rock and West Rock. Science Hill is a portion of a sandstone drumlin that was sheltered from glacial erosion by a traprock ridge, Mill Rock, to its north. The south–north rise of Science Hill is approximately 80 feet (24 m) at a 4.5% grade, processing northward to a peak elevation of 150 feet (46 m) above sea level near the Yale Divinity School.

== History ==
=== Sachem's Wood estate (1784–1910) ===
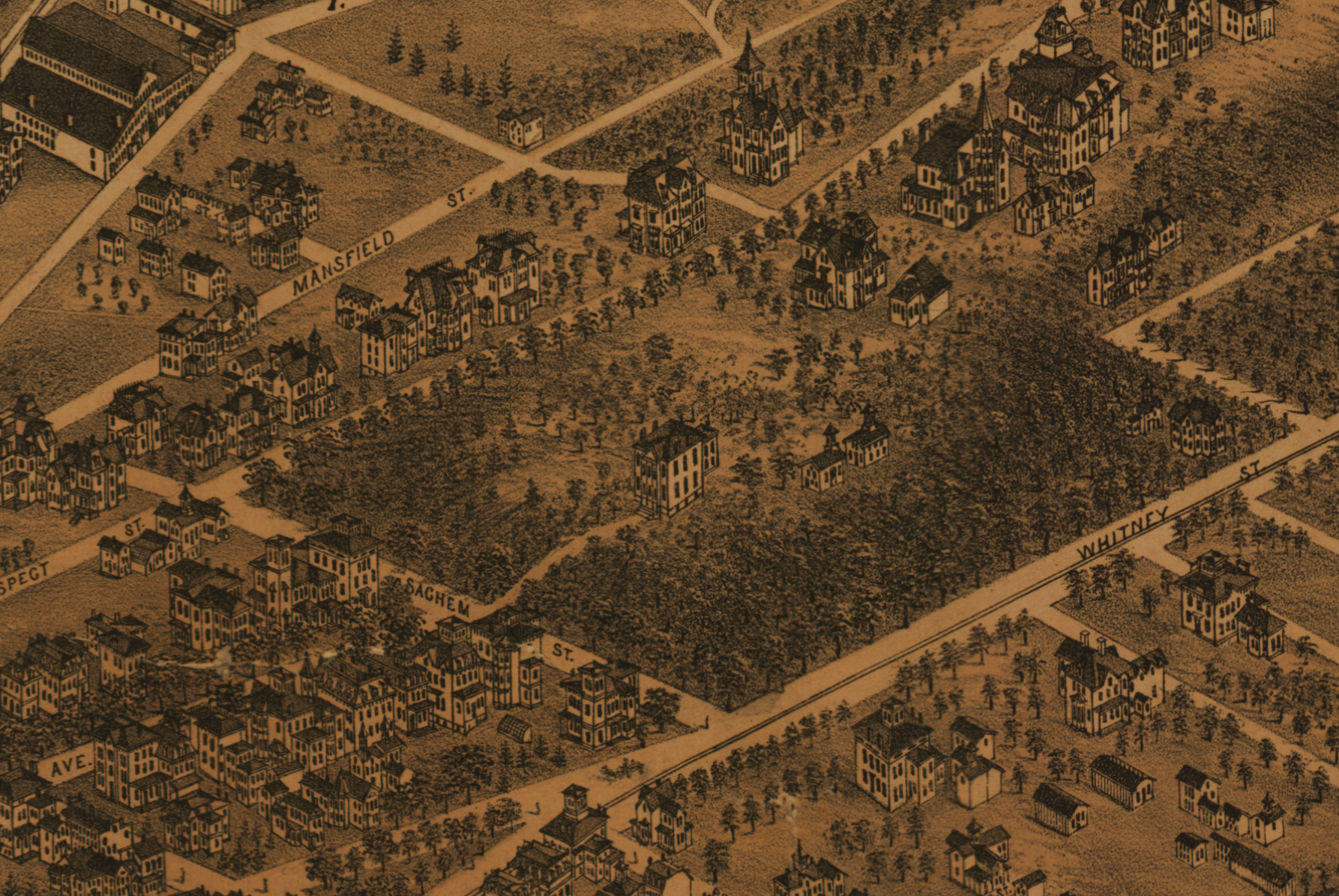
1879 perspective map of Sachem's Wood

The Science Hill site is not known to be inhabited until 1784, when it was purchased by James Hillhouse, New Haven's largest landowner. Hillhouse built a wide road, now Hillhouse Avenue, to extend to the foot of the hill, but planned to use the ridge itself for his own residence, and called the tract "Temple Square." Hillhouse bequeathed the land to his son, James Abraham Hillhouse, who built a family estate known as Sachem's Wood, a name derived from European-descended Hillhouse's supposedly Native American facial features. A secluded mansion, designed by Ithiel Town, was finished in 1828 at the present-day site of Kline Biology Tower. Later, the surrounding lots were developed into revivalist mansions, but the large Hillhouse tract remained an undivided estate.

Science education at Yale College came in 1802 with the appointment of Benjamin Silliman as professor of chemistry. Although Silliman was given a basement laboratory on Old Brick Row, sciences were marginal within the university's curriculum. In 1847, the Sheffield Scientific School was founded as a separate school of Yale, and it began expanding its campus between the university's main campus and Sachem's Wood. Although a corporate entity of the university, the school was socially and administratively separate from the rest of Yale. Yale College students did not attend Sheffield classes, and Sheffield students lived in societies and dormitories separate from Yale College students. Over time, the division caused Yale's science education and research efforts to suffer.

=== Purchase by Yale and early growth (1910–1945) ===
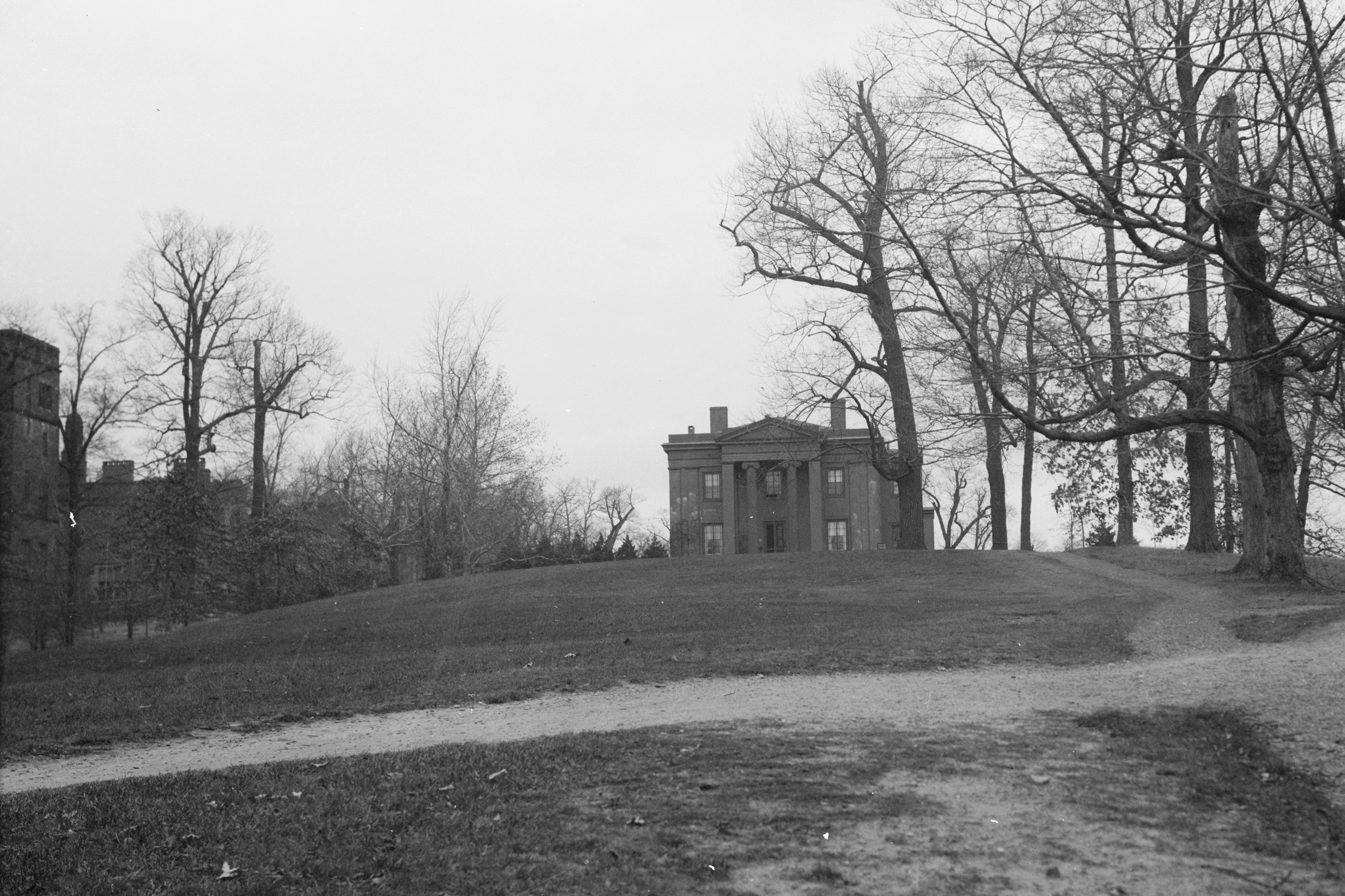
The Hillhouse family mansion at the present-day site of Kline Biology Tower

By the turn of the 20th century, there were few large, undeveloped tracts of land near Yale's campus. The largest was Sachem's Wood, which a group of Yale alumni purchased from the Hillhouse family in 1905, hoping to give Yale room to expand. Seeking to build new science facilities and bring the Sheffield Scientific School under greater university control and strengthen university science research, Yale raised funds from Olivia Sage to purchase the estate in 1910, renaming it Pierson-Sage Square. It was the largest single acquisition of land since Yale's founding. The university drew up two early site plans for the property: a Frederick Law Olmsted site plan in 1905, and a university-wide master plan by John Russell Pope in 1919. Neither was fully enacted, but elements of both are evident throughout the present-day site.

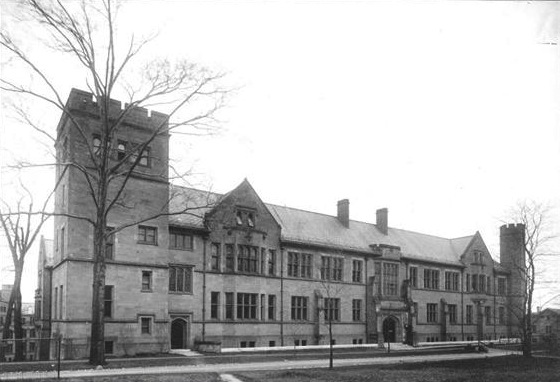
Sloane Physics Laboratory, the first science building completed after Sachem's Wood was purchased by Yale

Shortly after the land acquisition, a gift was received from brothers Henry and William Sloane for a new physics laboratory. Within the decade, Yale built chemistry, zoology, and botany laboratories, and new buildings for the Forestry School, and Peabody Museum, all in the Gothic Revival style popular at Yale in the early 20th century. The new facilities allowed Yale to demolish its older science buildings on its central campus, including the original Peabody Museum and Sloane Physical Laboratory, making room for the residential college system. Meanwhile, the Sachem's Wood mansion, preserved for the Hillhouse family in the purchase agreement, was increasingly surrounded by large laboratory facilities. After the death of the last Hillhouse heir, Yale demolished the mansion in 1942.

=== Expansion of science facilities (1945–present) ===
After World War II, residential overcrowding and an influx of married students prompted Yale to build temporary quonset huts on undeveloped areas of Pierson-Sage Square. The advent of the "atomic age" prompted a second period of laboratory building. University president A. Whitney Griswold relied on modernist architects for these facilities, breaking with pre-war gothic fervor. He asked Paul Schweikher for a Gibbs Laboratory design, Eero Saarinen for Ingalls Rink, and Philip Johnson for the Kline Biology Tower, Chemistry Laboratory, and Geology Building. Like Olmsted and Rogers, Saarinen and Johnson were also asked to improve the site plan. Saarinen's vision contributed modestly to the configuration, while Johnson's buildings gave Science Hill a central courtyard.

In 1966, the construction of Wright Nuclear Structure Laboratory (WNSL), named for Arthur W. Wright, allowed Yale to house the first emperor Van de Graaff particle accelerator. Once the most powerful accelerator of its type, it was decommissioned in 2011 as other particle research facilities became more useful to the field. In 2013, Karsten Heeger initiated a transformation of the WNSL accelerator facility into a state-of-the-art facility, research program, and community that is equipped to develop, build and use research instrumentation for experiments across the globe that investigate the invisible universe. The new Wright Lab opened officially in a public opening ceremony on May 16, 2017.

At the end of the 20th century, Yale President Rick Levin announced new investments in sciences and medicine. In the years following, the university has launched at least five major building and renovation projects, including new buildings for biology, chemistry, environmental science, and the Forestry School.

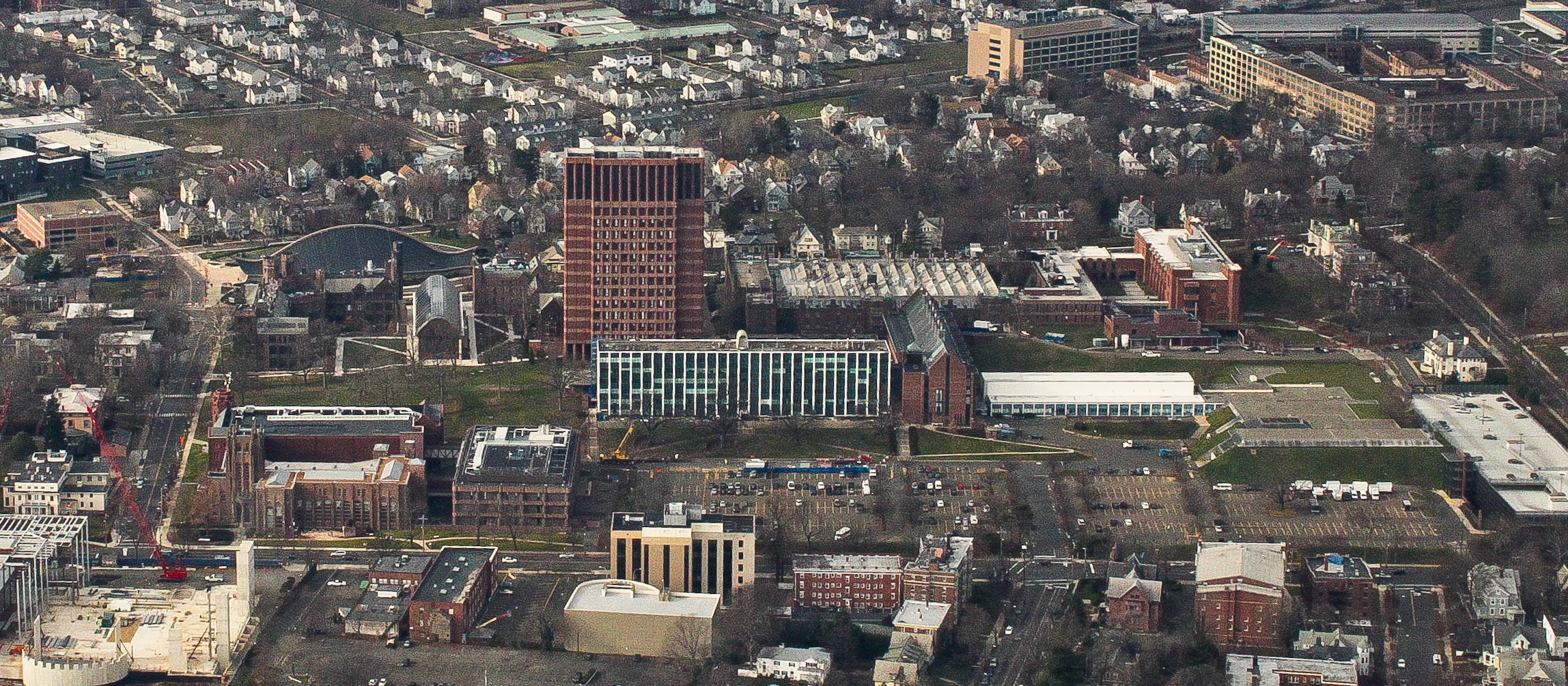
Aerial view of Science Hill from the Whitney Avenue side (west) in 2011. Hillhouse Avenue begins middle left; a portion of the Winchester Repeating Arms Factory is at top right.

== University organizations and departments ==
The departments of the Graduate School of Arts and Sciences with facilities on Science Hill are: Astronomy; Chemistry; Ecology and Evolutionary Biology; Molecular Biophysics and Biochemistry; Molecular, Cellular and Developmental Biology; Geology & Geophysics; Physics, and Applied Physics. Some biology faculty have joint appointments in the Yale School of Medicine and have laboratory space within the medical campus.

Most offices and laboratories of the Yale School of Forestry are housed on Science Hill, with a few to its north at Marsh Hall. The school first came to Science Hill in 1924 with the completion of Sage Hall as its new main building. In 2008, the school opened Kroon Hall adjacent to Sage. The school also occupies several former mansions at the top of Science Hill.

Connecticut's largest natural history museum, the Peabody Museum of Natural History, relocated from downtown New Haven to the southeastern corner of Science Hill in 1925. The museum is Yale's main repository of scientific collections, including fossils, minerals, archeological artifacts, and animal specimens. As its collections have grown, they have been shifted among at least five science hill buildings, and are currently housed in the museum and the adjacent Kline Geology Laboratory and Environmental Science Center. The museum also hosts permanent and rotating exhibitions for visitors.

Two facilities of the Yale University Library are located on Science Hill. The Center for Science & Social Science Information, formerly the Kline Science Library, is housed in the lower levels of Kline Biology Tower, and a geology library resides in Kline Geology Laboratory.

The Yale Sustainable Food Project is housed in a mansion at the top of the hill and possesses a farm across the street.

== Architecture and art ==
The dominant architectural styles of Science Hill are Gothic revival and mid-century modernist. Later buildings, like the Environmental Science Center and the Bass Center, have attempted to harmonize these earlier styles. Several buildings are recognized as important architectural monuments, most notably Eero Saarinen's Ingalls Rink and Philip Johnson's Kline Biology Tower.

For most of its history, Science Hill has been criticized for its lack of site planning. Architectural historian Elizabeth Mills Brown appraised its 1960s incarnation as Yale's "most poorly integrated, inefficient, and incoherent complex," observing that undeveloped land had offered too much freedom to plan comprehensively. More recently, a campus plan commissioned by the university articulated similar concerns, calling the area "an ill-defined and unattractive pedestrian environment" lacking a "sense of place and focus." Since 2000, Yale has invested significant resources in improving buildings and connecting areas within Science Hill.

Several sculptures decorate the hillside. To commemorate his work to found the Sheffield Scientific School, a statue of Benjamin Silliman cast by John Ferguson Weir resides outside the Sterling Chemistry Laboratory. A Roy Lichtenstein sculpture entitled "Modern Head" was placed at the base of Science Hill, near Hillhouse Avenue, in 1993.

== List of buildings ==
Name	Photograph	Year Built	Architect	Description
Sachem's Wood		1828	Ithiel Town; Alexander Jackson Davis	Originally named Highwood, "Sachem's Wood" described both the mansion, at the present-day site of Kline Biology Tower, and the surrounding estate. The name derived from James Hillhouse's supposedly Native American facial features. After acquiring the estate in 1910, Yale demolished the home in 1942.
340 Edwards Street		c.1900	unknown	A Spanish revival mansion, now housing the Yale Center for Emotional Intelligence
380 Edwards Street		1903	Richard Clipston Sturgis	A colonial revival mansion originally located at 285 Prospect Street, it was relocated to Edwards Street in 2003 to accommodate the new Chemistry Research Building. It houses laboratories and offices of the Forestry School.
301 Prospect Street		1907		A stucco, colonial revival mansion, now housing Yale School of the Environment offices.
360 Edwards Street		c.1910	unknown	A brick, colonial revival mansion. Currently a university-owned residential building.
Sloane Physics Laboratory	Sloane Physics Library with Kline Biology Tower behind	1912	Charles C. Haight	The first science building on the Sachem's Wood property was this gothic revival laboratory named for the same donors as a razed physics laboratory near Old Campus
Osborn Memorial Laboratories	Osborn Memorial Lab from Sachem Street and Prospect Street (south)	1913	Charles C. Haight	A gothic revival laboratory originally intended for zoology and botany. It is entirely constructed of masonry.
Sterling Chemistry Laboratory	Front of Sterling Chemistry Laboratory from Sloane Physics Laboratory	1923	William Adams Delano	The first of many buildings donated to Yale by John Sterling, it is the largest gothic building on Science Hill and the last laboratory building constructed before World War II.
Sage Hall	Sage Hall from Prospect Street	1924	William Adams Delano	The Forestry School's second building, Sage Hall was designed in the same gothic style as the nearby Sterling and Osborn Labs
Peabody Museum	Peabody from across Whitney Avenue (east)	1925	Charles Klauder	Replacing an earlier building on High Street, an enlarged building was designed to accommodate an Apatosaurus skeleton and other collections.
Accelerator Laboratories		1953	Douglas Orr	
Josiah Willard Gibbs Laboratory	Josiah Williard Gibbs Lab from south	1955	Paul Schweikher; Douglas Orr	J.W. Gibbs Lab was Science Hill's first modernist building, constructed to house physics research facilities. It was also home to the Department of Astronomy. It was demolished in 2017 to make way for the new multidisciplinary Yale Science Building.
Ingalls Rink	Main entrance of Ingalls Rink from the south	1958	Eero Saarinen	The ice rink was Saarinen's first building commission at Yale and is the only athletic facility in the Science Hill area.
Bingham Oceanographic Laboratory		1959		An extension of the Peabody was created to house oceanographic collections. It was demolished in 2001.
Wright Lab (formerly the A.W. Wright Nuclear Structure Laboratory)		1966	Douglas Orr	Named for an early Yale physicist, the compound is a low-slung, concrete structure, originally built to house a Van de Graaff particle accelerator. From 2013-2017, it was renovated and transformed into the new Wright Lab, a state-of-the-art facility equipped for researchers to develop, build and use research instrumentation for experiments across the globe that investigate the invisible universe.
Kline Geology Laboratory	Kline Geology Laboratory from the hillside near J.W. Gibbs Lab	1963	Philip Johnson; Richard Foster	Part of Johnson's Kline Science Center, the building connects to the Peabody museum and contains offices and labs for the Department of Geology & Geophysics.
Kline Biology Tower	Kline Biology Tower from the south	1965	Philip Johnson; Richard Foster	Built on the site of Sachem's Wood, the 16-story laboratory building is surrounded by a Johnson-designed courtyard and contains a library in its basement.
Bass Center for Molecular & Structural Biology		1993	Michael McKinnell	This biology building completed the quadrangle created by the earlier Johnson complex. Its designed is intended to harmonize surrounding modernist and gothic buildings.
Class of 1954 Environmental Science Center	Environmental Science Center from the south	2005	David M. Schwarz	The Environmental Science Center houses Peabody collections and environmental science laboratories. It replaced Bingham Laboratory.
Class of 1954 Chemistry Research Building	Class of 1954 Chemistry Research Building from Prospect Street	2005	Bohlin Cywinski Jackson	Built to consolidate laboratories in Sterling and Kline Chemistry Laboratories.
Kroon Hall	Kroon Hall from Prospect Street	2008	Hopkins Architects	The faculty and administrative building of the Yale School of Forestry & Environmental Studies. Kroon Hall was rated LEED Platinum in 2010.

== In Literature ==
A reflection on James Hillhouse's property is given in Lydia Sigourney's poem Moonlight at Sachem's Wood, which is accompanied by some notes upon his family. This was published in her volume, Scenes in my Native Land, in 1845.
