= Anna Hayes =

Irish-American physicist

Anna Catherine Hayes-Sterbenz is an Irish-American physicist. Her research concerns nuclear physics, weak interactions, and the physics of neutrinos and plasmas, including studies of the neutron output from inertial confinement fusion reactors and neutrino output from fission reactors, and the use of these outputs in detecting nuclear proliferation. She works at the Los Alamos National Laboratory, where she heads the Nuclear, Particle, Astrophysics and Cosmology Group (T-2) of the Theoretical Division.

== Education and career ==
Hayes was an undergraduate in Ireland, at Trinity College Dublin. She completed a Ph.D. in 1986 in the Yale Wright Laboratory, with the dissertation Microscopic Study of Enhanced E1 transitions in ^{18}O, supervised by D. Allan Bromley and coadvised by David John Millener of the Brookhaven National Laboratory.

After postdoctoral research at the University of Minnesota and the Los Alamos National Laboratory, Hayes joined the Chalk River Laboratories in Canada in 1991. She returned to Los Alamos as a permanent research staff member in 1997.

== Recognition ==
Hayes was named as a Fellow of the American Physical Society (APS) in 2002, after a nomination from the APS Division of Nuclear Physics, "for her contributions to studies of the weak interaction in nuclei, in particular providing the nuclear-structure calculations of the underlying weak matrix elements". In 2019, she was named as a Los Alamos National Laboratory Fellow.
