= William Conrad Gibbons =

American academic (1926–2015)

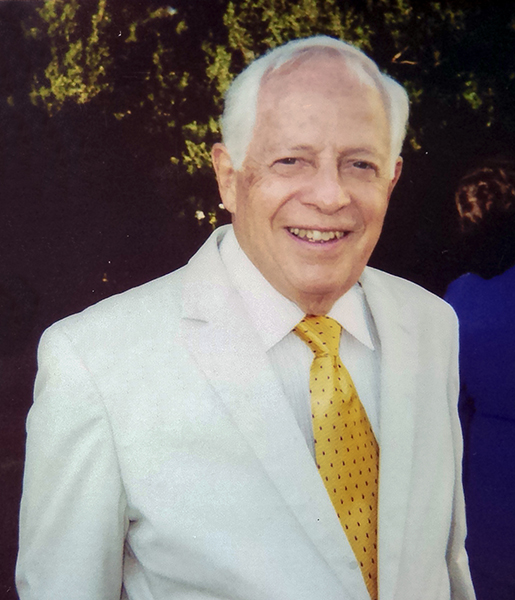
- Gibbons in 2002
- Born: William Conrad Gibbons; September 26, 1926; Harrisonburg, Virginia, United States
- Died: July 4, 2015 (aged 88); Monroe, Virginia, United States
- Education: Randolph–Macon College (BA); Princeton University (MA, PhD)
- Occupations: Author, educator
- Relatives: John H. Gibbons (brother)

William Conrad Gibbons (September 26, 1926 – July 4, 2015) was an American historian and foreign policy expert.

== Life and career ==
Gibbons was born in 1926 in Harrisonburg, Virginia, to Howard and Jessie Gibbons; he had a younger brother, John H. Gibbons, an American scientist and nuclear physicist. In 1945, Gibbons entered the University of Virginia. His studies were interrupted in order to serve in World War II but he returned to finish his college education at Randolph–Macon College in Ashland, Virginia and was graduated in 1949. Dr. Gibbons went on to earn his Masters and Ph.D. in Government from Princeton University in 1957 and was in the class of the American Political Science Association Congressional Fellowship Program.

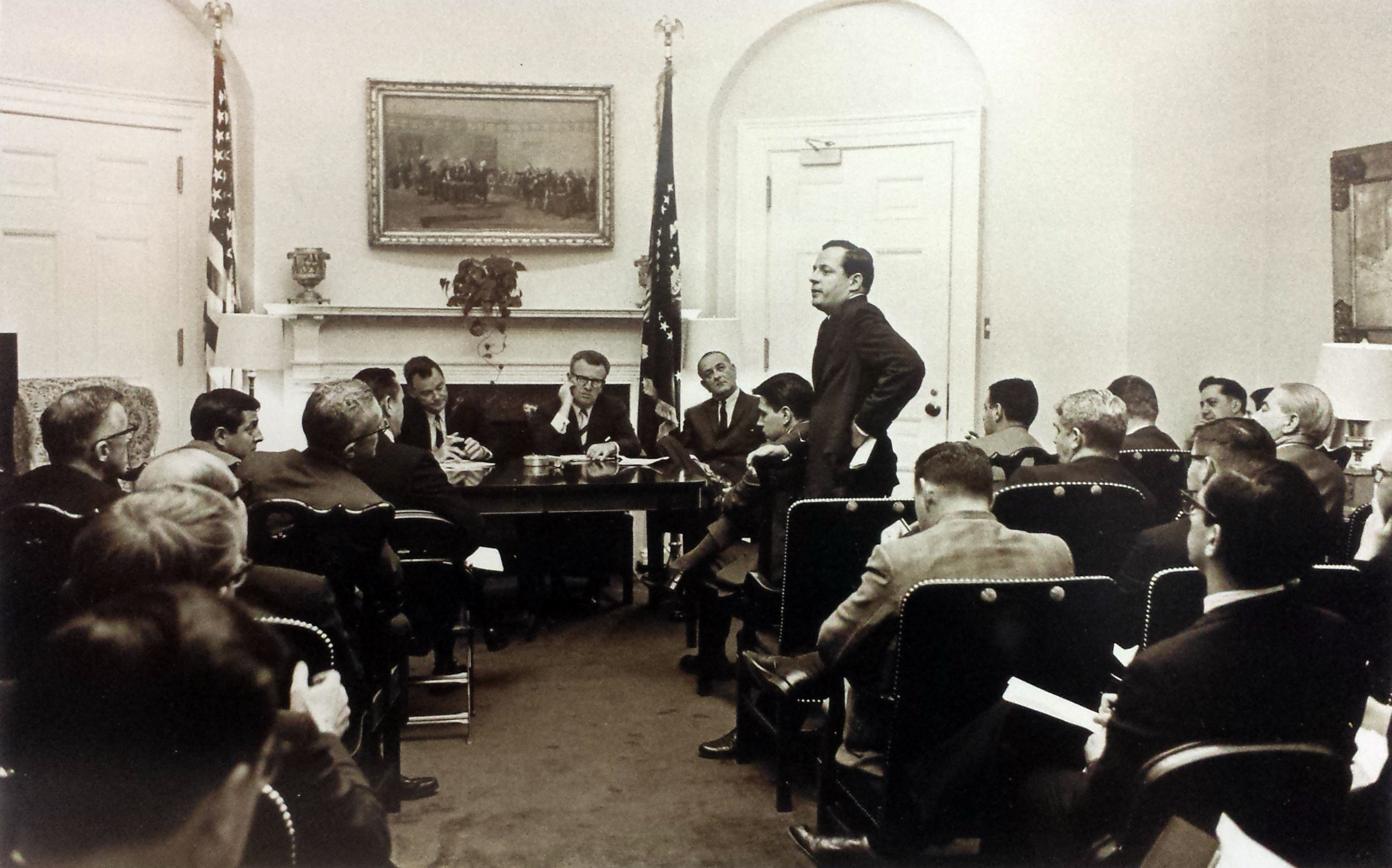
Gibbons (standing), Professional Staff Member of the Democratic Policy Committee and Assistant to the Majority Leader of the Senate, with Senator Lyndon B. Johnson seated in the background.

He worked in Capitol Hill for both Senator Wayne Morse and Senator Mike Mansfield and also served as an advance man for presidential contender Lyndon B. Johnson in 1960. He was a professional staff member of the Democratic Policy Committee and Assistant to the Majority Leader of the United States Senate (Lyndon B. Johnson followed by Mike Mansfield).

Gibbons ran for Congress from the Western District of Virginia, which covered his hometown of Harrisonburg but didn't win. He then returned to Washington to work as legislative program staff (1962–63); Deputy Director (1963–65) and Director (1965–68) of Congressional Liaison for the Agency for International Development, Department of State.

At the beginning of the Nixon Administration, William Gibbons left Washington to set up and head the political science department at Texas A&M University. He went on to be a visiting professor at Wellesley College and worked briefly as the Senior Program Officer in charge of all historical activities for the American Revolution Bicentennial Commission. In 1972, Dr. Gibbons became a senior analyst for the Foreign Affairs Division (FAND) of the Library of Congress. It was as a senior analyst at FAND that he authored the four-volume set entitled The U.S. Government and the Vietnam War. His work is published quietly by the scholarly Princeton University Press and the Congressional Research Service, and he receives no royalties.

The series has been described by historians and journalists as: "By far the best books on the subject" (William Bundy), "The master of Vietnam research" (David Maraniss), "Bill is an overlooked hero...for people like myself, well, just watch how much his name comes up in the footnotes" (Paul Hendrickson), "One of the most valuable studies of the formulation of Vietnam policy during the Kennedy and Johnson administrations" (Stanley Karnow), and "the dean of American Vietnam researchers" (David E. Kaiser).

In 1980 he became a visiting professor at George Mason University where he continued work on the series. On July 4, 2015, Gibbons died at the age of 88 after a stroke at his farm in Monroe, Virginia.

== Papers ==
Deposited at the Lyndon B. Johnson Library.

Collection of fifteen linear feet (35 archive boxes) comprising copies of old original documents, being the files of historian William Conrad Gibbons, assembled during the research and writing of his multi-volume scholarly work The U.S. Government and the Vietnam War: Executive and Legislative Roles and Relationships (Princeton University Press).

Filed in chronological order, the documents cover the presidency of Lyndon B. Johnson, from November 1963 to December 1968. The documents are concerned primarily with the background, formulation, and implementation of high-level policy by officials in the White House, the Congress, the State Department, the Defense Department, and the armed forces during the Vietnam War.

The documents were copied at several libraries and repositories across the country, including the Johnson Library, the National Archives, the U.S. Department of State, the U.S. Department of Defense, the U.S. Army Military History Institute, the United States Army Center of Military History.

== Bibliography ==
- Gibbons, William Conrad (2014). The U.S. Government and the Vietnam War: Executive and Legislative Roles and Relationships, Part I: 1945-1960. Princeton: Princeton University Press. ISBN 978-0-691-61036-8. JSTOR j.ctt7ztgmv. LCCN 86003270. OCLC 1303502388. Project MUSE book 34359.
- Gibbons, William Conrad (2014). The U.S. Government and the Vietnam War: Executive and Legislative Roles and Relationships, Part II: 1961-1964. Princeton: Princeton University Press. ISBN 978-0-691-61038-2. JSTOR j.ctt7ztnxf. LCCN 86003270. OCLC 881140292. Project MUSE book 34303.
- Gibbons, William Conrad (2014). The U.S. Government and the Vietnam War: Executive and Legislative Roles and Relationships, Part III: 1965-1966. Princeton: Princeton University Press. ISBN 978-0-691-60503-6. JSTOR j.ctt7zvfhc. LCCN 86003270. OCLC 890440165. Project MUSE book 34425.
- Gibbons, William Conrad (2014). The U.S. Government and the Vietnam War: Executive and Legislative Roles and Relationships, Part IV: July 1965-January 1968. Princeton: Princeton University Press. ISBN 978-0-691-60510-4. JSTOR j.ctt7zvg4h. LCCN 86003270. OCLC 1196189736. Project MUSE book 34074.
- Gibbons, William C.; Melanson, Richard A.; Thompson, Kenneth W. (1985). Vietnam and the Breakdown of Consensus. Foreign Policy and Domestic Consensus: The Credibility of Institutions, Policies and Leadership. Vol. 11. Lanham, Maryland: University Press of America. ISBN 978-0-8191-4865-0. LCCN 85015655. OCLC 12285729.
