= John H. Gibbons (scientist) =

American physicist (1929–2015)

Jack Gibbons
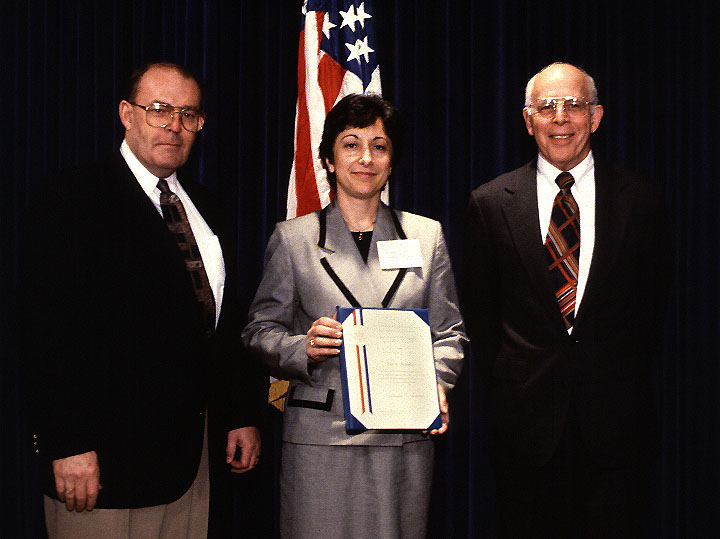
- Gibbons (right)

6th Director of the Office of Science and Technology Policy
- In office January 20, 1993 – April 3, 1998
- President: Bill Clinton
- Preceded by: D. Allan Bromley
- Succeeded by: Kerri-Ann Jones (acting)

Personal details
- Born: January 15, 1929 Harrisonburg, Virginia, U.S.
- Died: July 17, 2015 (aged 86) Crozet, Virginia, U.S.
- Relatives: William Conrad Gibbons (brother)
- Education: Randolph-Macon College (BS); Duke University (MS, PhD)
- Scientific career
- Workplaces: Oak Ridge National Laboratory; University of Tennessee; Office of Technology Assessment
- Thesis: High resolution measurements of neutron cross-sections (1954)
- Doctoral advisor: Henry W. Newson

John Howard "Jack" Gibbons (January 15, 1929 – July 17, 2015) was an American scientist, nuclear physicist, and internationally recognized expert in technologies for energy efficiency and energy resource conservation. He served as the assistant to the president for science and technology and director of the White House Office of Science and Technology Policy under President Bill Clinton from 1993 to 1998.

== Education ==
Gibbons received two bachelor's degrees, one in mathematics and the other in chemistry from Randolph-Macon College in 1949, and a doctorate in nuclear physics from Duke University in 1954.

== Career ==
Following his formal training in physics, Gibbons spent 15 years at Oak Ridge National Laboratory. At Oak Ridge, he studied the structure of atomic nuclei, with emphasis on the role of neutron capture in the nucleosynthesis of heavy elements in stars. In the late 1960s, at the urging of Alvin M. Weinberg, he pioneered studies on how to use technology to conserve energy and minimize the environmental impacts of energy production and consumption.

In 1973, Gibbons was appointed the first director of the U.S. Federal Office of Energy Conservation. In 1975 he returned to Tennessee to direct the University of Tennessee Energy, Environment and Resources Center.

Gibbons was appointed In 1979 to direct the US Congressional Office of Technology Assessment,. which provided the Congress with nonpartisan, comprehensive analyses on a broad spectrum of issues involving technology and public policy. His tenure at OTA lasted over two six-year terms, until 1992.

President Bill Clinton appointed Gibbons to serve as the assistant to the president for science and technology and director of the White House Office of Science and Technology Policy; his tenure there lasted from February 2, 1993, to April 15, 1998. As the president's science advisor, he co-chaired the President's Committee of Advisors on Science and Technology (PCAST) and was a member of the Domestic Policy Council, the National Economic Council, the National Security Council, and the National Science and Technology Council, which coordinated science and technology policy and budgets across the federal government.

After leaving the White House, Gibbons served as the Karl T. Compton Lecturer at MIT (1998–1999) and senior fellow at the National Academy of Engineering (1999–2000) where he assisted NAE's president on a variety of topics including the new NAE program in Earth Systems Engineering. During 1999-2001 he was Senior Advisor to the U.S. Department of State where he assisted the Secretary in revitalizing science and technology capabilities, including creating the position of Science Advisor to the Secretary.

== Scientific affiliations and awards ==
Between 1994 and 1997 he earned five honorary doctorates from the Illinois Institute of Technology, Mt. Sinai Medical School, the University of Delaware, Duke University, and the University of Maryland.

Gibbons was a fellow of the American Physical Society and the American Association for the Advancement of Science (AAAS) and was elected to membership in the National Academy of Engineering. He was a member of the American Philosophical Society and the American Academy of Arts and Sciences. He was awarded the AAAS Philip Hauge Abelson Prize for sustained exceptional contributions to advancing science; the Leo Szilard Award for Physics in the Public Interest from the American Physical Society; and medals from the German and French governments for fostering scientific cooperation. Gibbons has over 50 publications on energy and environmental policy.

From 2000-2001 he was the elected President of Sigma Xi, The Scientific Research Society.

In 2004 he became one of the founding members and served on the Board of Directors of Scientists and Engineers for America, a 501(c)(3) organization focused on promoting sound science in American government. He was also a member of the Council on Foreign Relations and the Federation of American Scientists.

In 2005 he was awarded the US Civilian Research and Development Foundation (CRDF) George Brown Award for International Science and Technology Collaboration, CRDF's highest award, established to honor the late Rep. George Brown, Jr.

== Tributes ==
Former Senator and Vice President Al Gore issued a statement on July 29, 2015, eulogizing Gibbons, which reads, in part: "I am deeply saddened by the news that my good friend, former colleague and fellow Tennessean, Jack Gibbons, recently passed away. I first worked with Jack while serving in the House of Representatives after he had left the Oak Ridge National Laboratory to take the helm of the Congressional Office of Technology Assessment during an increasingly complex scientific and technological age. I, later, had the privilege of working even more closely with him after his appointment to serve as the Assistant to the President for Science and Technology at the beginning of the new administration in January 1993. Jack had a rare and uncanny ability to look at critical large-scale issues affecting our planet through scientific, technological, social and ethical lenses and present a definitive overview to help policy makers better address such issues and better anticipate future problems. It was Jack's optimism and imagination that did so much to help the United States face the difficult issues of our time, including the climate crisis. He was utterly unique and irreplaceable."

== Personal and family life ==
Gibbons was born in Harrisonburg, Virginia, in 1929. As a teenager he became an Eagle Scout and earned the Order of the Arrow. Gibbons married Mary Ann Hobart in 1955; together they had three children: Virginia Neil, Diana Conrad, and Mary Marshall. For many years until shortly before his death, he and his wife resided in The Plains, Virginia. He is preceded in death by a brother, William Conrad Gibbons (1926-2015), an American historian noted for his in-depth chronicling of the Vietnam War. Gibbons died after a stroke at Crozet, Virginia, in 2015.

Government offices
Preceded by D. Allan Bromley	Director of the Office of Science and Technology Policy; 1993–1998	Succeeded by Kerri-Ann Jones; Acting
