= Ars longa, vita brevis =

Latin translation of a Greek aphorism

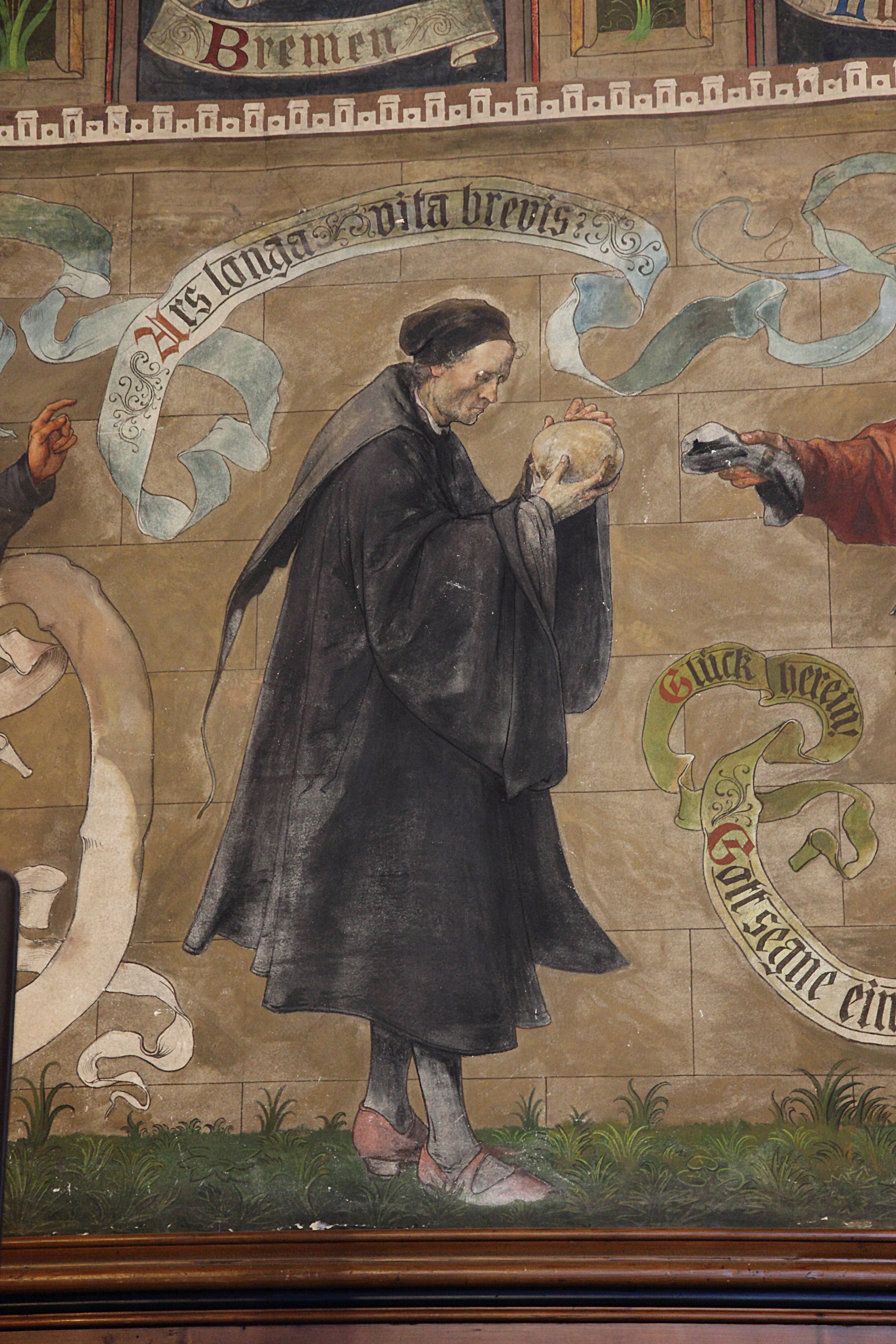
Mural at the Old Town Hall (Göttingen) in Germany.

Ars longa, vita brevis is a Latin translation of an aphorism coming originally from Greek. It roughly translates to "skillfulness takes time and life is short".

The aphorism quotes the first two lines of the Aphorisms by the ancient Greek physician Hippocrates: "Ὁ βίος βραχύς, ἡ δὲ τέχνη μακρή". The familiar Latin translation ars longa, vita brevis reverses the order of the original lines, but can express the same principle.

== Translations ==
The original text, a standard Latin translation, and an English translation from the Greek follow.

Greek:	Romanized
Ὁ βίος βραχύς, ἡ δὲ τέχνη μακρή, ὁ δὲ καιρὸς ὀξύς, ἡ δὲ πεῖρα σφαλερή, ἡ δὲ κρίσις χαλεπή.	Ho bíos brakhús, hē dè tékhnē makrḗ, ho dè kairòs oxús, hē dè peîra sphalerḗ, hē dè krísis khalepḗ.
Latin:	English:
Vīta brevis, ars longa, occāsiō praeceps, experīmentum perīculōsum, iūdicium difficile.	Life is short, and craft long, opportunity fleeting, experimentations perilous, and judgment difficult.

== Interpretation ==
Despite the common usage of the Latin version, Ars longa, vita brevis, the usage caveat is about the Greek original that contains the word tékhnē (technique and craft) that is translated as the Latin ars (art) as in the usage The Art of War. The authorship of the aphorism is ascribed to the physician Hippocrates, as the preface of his medical text: "The physician must not only be prepared to do what is right himself, but also to make the patient, the attendants, and externals cooperate".

== In academia ==
The phrase was used as the title of the dissertation of James Morris Whiton, who, in 1861, was one of the first three men to earn a PhD from an American university.

== Similar sayings ==
The late-medieval author Chaucer (c. 1343–1400) observed "The lyf so short, the craft so long to lerne" ("The life so short, the craft so long to learn", the first line of the Parlement of Foules). The first-century CE rabbi Tarfon is quoted as saying "The day is short, the labor vast, the workers are lazy, the reward great, the Master urgent." (Avot 2:15). A light-hearted version in England, thought to have originated in Shropshire, is the pun "Bars longa, vita brevis" i.e. so many bars (or pubs) to visit, in so short a life.

In 1890, Ariel, a London illustrated newspaper, announced a great national cycling song competition. Frederic Cowen was chosen to adjudicate the competition, which received no less than 304 entries. The winner was a song composed by Mr C. Francis Lloyd, of South Shields, and the title of his composition was Vita Brevis Ars Longa.

== See also ==
- Bounded rationality
- Parallelism (rhetoric)
