= Richard Casten =

American physicist

- Born: November 1, 1941 (age 84); New York City, U.S.
- Education: College of the Holy Cross (BS); Yale University (MS, PhD)
- Awards: Humboldt Prize (1983); Tom W. Bonner Prize in Nuclear Physics (2011)
- Scientific career
- Fields: Nuclear physics; Nuclear structure
- Workplaces: Niels Bohr Institute; Los Alamos National Laboratory; Brookhaven National Laboratory; Yale University
- Thesis: Collective Nuclear Structure Studies in the Osmium Nuclei (1967)
- Doctoral advisor: D. Allan Bromley; Jack Greenberg

Richard Francis Xavier Casten (born November 1, 1941) is an American nuclear physicist known for his research in nuclear structure and radioactive nuclear beams. He is the D. Allan Bromley Professor Emeritus of Physics at Yale University, where he was the director of the Wright Nuclear Structure Laboratory from 1995 to 2008. He is also known for Casten's triangle, which was introduced in 1981.

== Early life and education ==
Casten was born on November 1, 1941, in New York City. His father was a Jewish surgeon from New York and his mother was a Catholic homemaker. Casten was raised in Manhattan and attended the Quaker Friends Seminary, where he took chemistry classes and decided to pursue physics.

Casten graduated from the College of the Holy Cross with a Bachelor of Science in physics, magna cum laude, in 1963. As an undergraduate at Holy Cross, he was elected to Delta Epsilon Sigma and was a member of its honors program. The college's focus on a liberal arts education allowed him to take courses in history and philosophy, which he later recalled as having "an effect on my whole research career".

After graduation, Casten pursued graduate studies at Yale University, where he studied Coulomb excitation in osmium isotopes under the direction of physicist D. Allan Bromley. He earned his Master of Science (M.S.) in physics from Yale in 1964 and his Ph.D. in physics from Yale in 1967. Casten had begun his dissertation in September 1963 and completed his thesis defense in August 1967; his doctoral committee included Bromley, Jack Greenberg, and Charles K. Bockelman. His doctoral dissertation, Collective Nuclear Structure Studies in the Osmium Nuclei, was the first thesis to be based upon research done with Yale's MP-1 tandem accelerator.

== Career ==
From 1967 to 1969, Casten was a postdoctoral research fellow at the Niels Bohr Institute of the University of Copenhagen. He was drawn to the institute due to his research in collective effects, and the two leading scientists of the field were Aage Bohr and Ben Mottelson, who were based there; Bohr and Mottelson would later win the Nobel Prize in Physics. In addition, the Niels Bohr Institute also housed Russian physicist Vilen Strutinsky. Casten learned Danish while in Denmark and recalled his research at the institute as being on "single particle, individual nucleon behavior".

Casten went to the Los Alamos National Laboratory (LANL) for additional postdoctoral research from 1969 to 1971. Thereafter, he became a physicist at the Nuclear Structure Group of the Brookhaven National Laboratory from 1971 to 1981, then a senior scientist from 1981 to 1997. Casten was the group leader of the Nuclear Structure Group from 1981 to 1996. In 1995, he assumed a position as the director of the A. W. Wright Nuclear Structure Laboratory (WNSL) at Yale University and was made a professor of physics that same year. He stepped down as director of the laboratory in 2008. In the summer of 2011, WNSL's accelerator was shut down.

Casten was a full professor at Yale until 2008, when he received the appointment as the university's D. Allan Bromley Professor of Physics. He served in that capacity until 2015, when he retired with emeritus status. As a professor, Casten taught graduate courses in introductory and advanced nuclear physics, and an undergraduate course for non-science majors entitled Physics in the World Around Us. He authored a textbook "Nuclear Structure from a Simple Perspective" (Oxford University Press, 1990, 2000) He has been an associate editor for Physical Review C for experimental nuclear structure. He held visiting positions at the Institut Laue–Langevin, at the University of Cologne's Institute for Nuclear Physics, at the CERN/ISOLDE facility, and at Stony Brook University. He chaired the United States Department of Energy's and National Science Foundation's Nuclear Science Advisory Committee (NSAC) from 2003 to 2005, and served on four NSAC Long Range Planning Groups. He was chair of the American Physical Society's Division of Nuclear Physics (DNP) in 2008, and of several Steering Committees for an advanced exotic beam facility from 1989 through 2009 and of the FRIB Science Advisory Committee from 2009 to 2012.

== Awards and honors ==
Casten was elected in 1981 to be a fellow of the American Physical Society (APS). In 1987, he was elected to be a fellow of the American Association for the Advancement of Science. In 1983, he received a Humboldt Award for Senior U.S. Scientists. He was awarded honorary doctorates by the University of Bucharest and the University of Surrey.

In 2009, Casten received the Mentoring Award from the Nuclear Physics Section of the APS for "his outstanding commitment to mentoring women in nuclear science and preparing them for leadership roles". In 2011, he received the Tom W. Bonner Prize in Nuclear Physics "for providing critical insight into the evolution of nuclear structure with varying proton and neutron numbers and the discovery of a variety of dynamic symmetries in nuclei".

== Selected publications ==
=== Articles ===
- Warner, D. D.; Casten, R. F. (1983). "Predictions of the interacting boson approximation in a consistent Q framework". Physical Review C. 28 (4): 1798–1806. Bibcode:1983PhRvC..28.1798W. doi:10.1103/PhysRevC.28.1798.
- Casten, R.F.; von Brentano, P. (1985). "An extensive region of O(6)-like nuclei near A = 130". Physics Letters B. 152 (1–2): 22–28. Bibcode:1985PhLB..152...22C. doi:10.1016/0370-2693(85)91131-1.
- Casten, R.F. (1985). "N_{p}N_{n} systematics in heavy nuclei". Nuclear Physics A. 443 (1): 1–28. Bibcode:1985NuPhA.443....1C. doi:10.1016/0375-9474(85)90318-5.
- Casten, R. F.; Warner, D. D. (1988). "The interacting boson approximation". Reviews of Modern Physics. 60 (2): 389–469. Bibcode:1988RvMP...60..389C. doi:10.1103/RevModPhys.60.389.
- Motobayashi, T.; Ikeda, Y.; Ieki, K.; Inoue, M.; Iwasa, N.; Kikuchi, T.; Casten, R. F. (1995). "Large deformation of the very neutron-rich nucleus ^{32}Mg from intermediate-energy Coulomb excitation". Physics Letters B. 346 (1–2): 9–14. Bibcode:1995PhLB..346....9M. doi:10.1016/0370-2693(95)00012-A. (over 950 citations)
- Casten, R. F.; Zamfir, N. V. (2001). "Empirical Realization of a Critical Point Description in Atomic Nuclei". Physical Review Letters. 87 (5) 052503. Bibcode:2001PhRvL..87e2503C. doi:10.1103/PhysRevLett.87.052503. PMID 11497765.
- Casten, R. F.; Zamfir, N. V. (2000). "Evidence for a Possible E(5) Symmetry in ^{134}Ba". Physical Review Letters. 85 (17): 3584–3586. Bibcode:2000PhRvL..85.3584C. doi:10.1103/PhysRevLett.85.3584. PMID 11030956.
- Casten, R. F. (2006). "Shape phase transitions and critical-point phenomena in atomic nuclei". Nature Physics. 2 (12): 811–820. Bibcode:2006NatPh...2..811C. doi:10.1038/nphys451. S2CID 121161416.
- Cejnar, Pavel; Jolie, Jan; Casten, Richard F. (2010). "Quantum phase transitions in the shapes of atomic nuclei". Reviews of Modern Physics. 82 (3): 2155–2212. Bibcode:2010RvMP...82.2155C. doi:10.1103/RevModPhys.82.2155.

=== Books ===
- Nuclear Structure from a Simple Perspective. Oxford Studies in Nuclear Physics, 23. Oxford University Press. 1990. Casten, R.; Casten, Richard F. (2000). 2nd edition. Oxford University Press. ISBN 0-19-850724-0.
- as editor: Algebraic approaches to nuclear structure: interacting boson and fermion models. Contemporary Concepts in Physics, volume 6 (1st ed.). CRC Press. 1993. ISBN 978-3-7186-0538-5. Castenholz, A. (2020). e-book. CRC Press. ISBN 978-1-000-15946-2.
