= Karsten Heeger =

German–American physicist

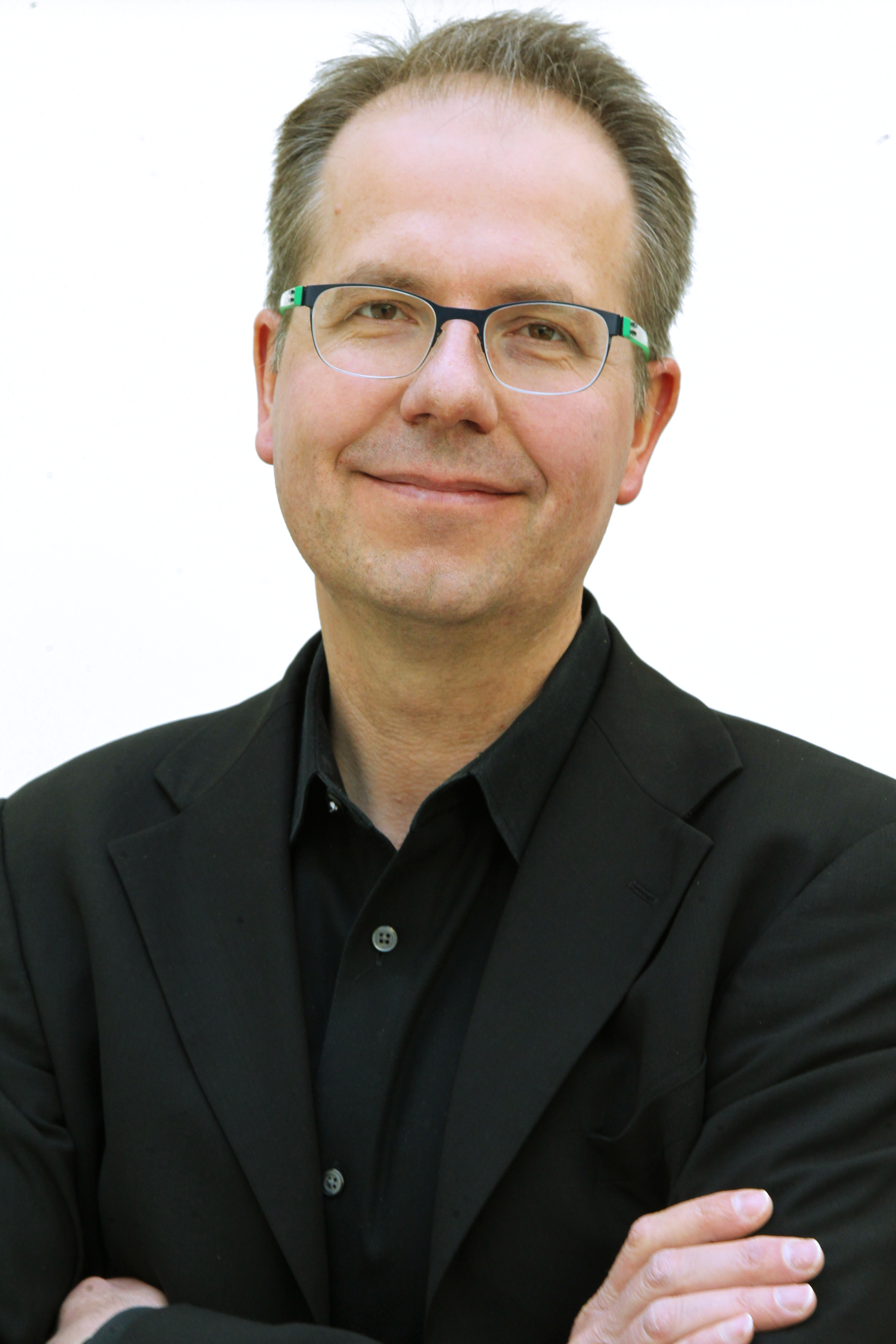
- Heeger in 2022
- Born: Karsten Miklas Heeger; Germany
- Education: Oxford University (B.A.), University of Washington (Ph.D.)
- Awards: Breakthrough Prize in Fundamental Physics (2016); Sloan Research Fellowship (2009)
- Scientific career
- Fields: Physics (nuclear physics)
- Workplaces: University of Wisconsin–Madison (2006 – 2013); Yale University (2013 – )
- Doctoral advisor: Hamish Robertson
- Website: https://heegerlab.yale.edu/

Karsten M. Heeger is a German–American physicist and Eugene Higgins Professor of Physics at Yale University, where he serves as director of Wright Laboratory and co-director of the Yale Center for the Invisible Universe. His work is primarily in the area of neutrino physics, focusing on the study of neutrino oscillations, neutrino mass, and dark matter.

== Education and career ==
Prof. Heeger received his undergraduate degree in physics from Oxford University and his Ph.D. from the University of Washington in Seattle, where he worked on a model-independent measurement of the solar ^{8}B neutrino flux in the Sudbury Neutrino Observatory (SNO). Before joining the faculty at Yale University, he was on the faculty at the University of Wisconsin and a Chamberlain Fellow at Lawrence Berkeley National Laboratory.

Heeger has served on national and international committees including the High Energy Physics Advisory Panel (HEPAP), the Nuclear Science Advisory Committee (NSAC), the Division of Particles and Fields (DPF) Executive Committee, and the American Physical Society (APS) Committee on International Scientific Affairs. He served as the Deputy Chair of the Particle Physics Project Prioritization Panel (P5) from 2022 to 2023 and was co-chair of the APS DPF Coordinating Panel of Advanced Detectors (CPAD) from 2020 to 2022. Heeger was a member of the 2015 Nuclear Physics Long Range Planning Group and the US ATLAS Project Advisory Group, and has served on review committees for the United States Department of Energy, the National Science Foundation, and the Natural Sciences and Engineering Council of Canada (NSERC). In 2025, he was elected to the Executive Committee of the APS Division of Nuclear Physics (DNP).

Prof. Heeger has been the director of the Yale Wright Laboratory since 2013 and served as chair of the Department of Physics at Yale University from 2019 to 2025, when he was succeeded by Sarah Demers. Since 2024, he has served as co-director of the Yale Center for the Invisible Universe.

== Research ==
Professor Heeger's research focuses on the study of neutrino oscillations and neutrino mass. He was involved in the resolution of the solar neutrino problem with the Sudbury Neutrino Observatory (SNO), the first observation of reactor antineutrino oscillation with KamLAND, and the first measurement of the neutrino mixing angle q_{13} with Daya Bay.

Heeger is studying the nature of neutrinos with the CUORE double beta decay experiment, performing R&D with Project 8 towards a novel experiment to measure neutrino mass, and assembling Charge Readout Planes at Yale Wright Laboratory for the DUNE detectors, which is an experiment that will enable the study of the matter-antimatter imbalance in the Universe and determine the ordering of neutrino mass states.

Heeger is co-Principal Investigator of CUORE, along with Reina Maruyama. From 2021 to 2025, he served as a co-spokesperson for the CUPID experiment, the successor to CUORE. From 2015 to 2024, Heeger was the PI and spokesperson of the PROSPECT experiment, which aims to make a precision measurement of reactor antineutrinos and search for sterile neutrinos at very short baselines.

As a graduate student, Heeger worked on the Sudbury Neutrino Observatory, where his dissertation on a measurement of the ^{8}B solar neutrino flux was awarded the 2003 Dissertation Award in Nuclear Physics by the American Physical Society.

== Honors and awards ==
Heeger's research work has been recognized with numerous awards. For his thesis work he was awarded the 2003 APS Dissertation Award in Nuclear Physics. In 2008 he received Outstanding Junior Investigator awards from DOE Nuclear Physics for the investigation of neutrino properties with bolometric detectors and from DOE High Energy Physics for the measurement of the neutrino mixing angle theta13 at Daya Bay. Heeger was awarded an Alfred P. Sloan Research Fellowship in 2009 and a UW Romnes Faculty Fellowship in 2011. He was named a Kavli Fellow in 2012. In 2013, he was named an American Physical Society (APS) fellow, nominated by the Division of Nuclear Physics (DNP) "for his contributions to the highest impact experiments in neutrino physics, especially for the major roles he played in the Daya Bay and KamLAND experiments". Heeger shared the 2016 Breakthrough Prize in Fundamental Physics as a member of three collaborations: SNO, KamLAND, and Daya Bay.

== Selected publications ==
A list of selected publications can be found on INSPIRE-HEP.

== Personal life ==
Heeger married experimental physicist, Reina Maruyama, in 2004.
