= James Morris Whiton =

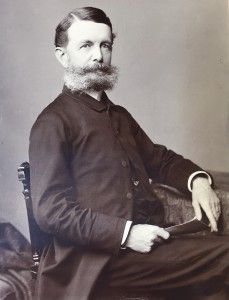
- Born: April 11, 1833; Boston, Massachusetts
- Died: January 25, 1920 (aged 86); New York City
- Education: Yale University (AB, PhD)
- Occupation: Lexicographer

James Morris Whiton Jr. (April 11, 1833 – January 25, 1920) was a teacher, linguist, lexicographer and clergyman. He is credited with creating the first Harvard–Yale Regatta in 1853, and is notable as one of the first three individuals to earn a PhD at an American university, earning the degree in classics at Yale University in 1861.

== Biography ==
=== Early life ===
Whiton was born in Boston, Massachusetts to James Morris Whiton (1809–1857) and Mary Elizabeth (Knowlton) Whitton (1809–1906). He graduated from the Boston Latin School in 1848 as valedictorian.

=== Studies at Yale ===
In the summer after his junior year at Yale, in June 1852, Whiton encountered James H. Elkins, then the superintendent of the Boston, Concord and Montreal Railroad while riding on a train. As the train passed through New Hampshire, Whiton noted that Lake Winnipesaukee would be an excellent location for a regatta. In response, Elkins remarked that if Whiton could organize a race between Harvard and Yale, that Elkins would pay for all the train fares and other bills.

Two months later, on August 3, 1852, the first Harvard-Yale Regatta was held, with Whiton rowing from the bow for Yale in a boat named the Undine.

In 1853, Whiton earned his BA from Yale University. He was also admitted to Phi Beta Kappa and was class salutatorian.

Starting in 1859, he began studying Sanskrit with William Dwight Whitney, which ultimately lead to him earning a PhD in classics at Yale in 1861. Whiton's PhD, awarded on July 25, 1861, was among the first of three such degrees in the United States, as Eugene Schuyler and Arthur Williams Wright also earned their PhDs from Yale that year.

Whiton took examinations in Latin, Greek, German and Sanskrit. The title of his dissertation was "Brevis Vita, Ars Longa," which consisted of six pages of Latin prose in the style of Cicero.

=== Teaching ===
After graduating Yale, Whiton worked for a year as a principal's assistant at the Worcester Classical and English High School in Worcester, MA. He then served as rector of the Hopkins Grammar School (1854–1865). He would later serve as the principal of Williston Seminary from 1876 to 1878.

=== Ministry ===
Besides his academic work, Whiton was a minister, spurred in part by the death of his younger sister in 1847. He studied at Andover Seminary for a year and then served as a minister in Lynn, Massachusetts (1865–1875), Newark, New Jersey (1879–1885) and New York City (1886–1891). Due to ill health he retired from full-time pastoral work in 1891 but then went on to work as a guest preacher over the next 20 years throughout New England.

=== Death ===
Whiton died in 1920 and is buried in Grove Street Cemetery in New Haven, Connecticut.

== Legacy ==
In 1888, he established the Whiton Prize at Talladega College.
