= Harry Wilks Fulbright =

American educator

- Born: September 19, 1918; Marion, Missouri
- Died: May 16, 2009 (aged 90)
- Education: Washington University in St. Louis (AB, Ph.D)
- Employer(s): Washington University in St. Louis; Los Alamos National Laboratory; Princeton University; University of Rochester
- Known for: Created the world's first variable-energy cyclotron

Harry Wilks Fulbright Jr. (September 19, 1918, Marion, Missouri – May 16, 2009, Rochester, New York) was an American physics professor, experimental nuclear physicist, and designer and builder of equipment for radio astronomy.

He graduated in 1940 with an A.B. and in 1944 with a Ph.D. in physics from Washington University in St. Louis. At Washington University in St. Louis he was in charge of the cyclotron and was under contract to the Manhattan Project from 1942 to 1944. From 1944 to 1946 he worked at Los Alamos National Laboratory. In 1947 he was elected a Fellow of the American Physical Society. From 1946 to 1950 he was a faculty member in the physics department of Princeton University. At the University of Rochester, he was an assistant professor from 1950 to 1952, an associate professor from 1952 to 1956, and a full professor from 1956 until his retirement in 1989 as professor emeritus. His doctoral students include D. Allan Bromley.

Fulbright was a Guggenheim Fellow, as well as a Fulbright Fellow, for the academic year 1956–1957, which he spent at the Niels Bohr Institute. He was a visiting professor for the academic year 1974–1975 year at the Université Louis Pasteur in Strasbourg, France. He was also a visiting lecturer at the University of Leningrad in 1983.

Perhaps Fulbright's most important achievement was his supervision of the rebuilding and modernization of the University of Rochester's 26-inch cyclotron. His modernization created the world's first variable-energy cyclotron. After the cyclotron was replaced by a Van de Graaff generator, the cyclotron was shipped to Panjab University in Chandigarh, India, where he was a visiting professor in 1977 and helped to install the cyclotron.

Fulbright spent the summer of 1986 helping to design and build equipment for a holographic determination of and improvement of the shape of the 140 ft. diameter Green Bank radio dish. ... As the director of the Advanced Undergraduate Lab in Physics and Astronomy, Fulbright included astronomical experiments in the complement he developed over the 11 year period before he retired. Among other experiments, he retrofitted an existing spectrograph with a thermoelectrically cooled 2048 element linear CCD to use at the University's C.E.K. Mees Observatory. A simple sliding shutter built into the slit structure of the spectrograph allowed automatic computer-controlled cyclic background subtraction.

Upon his death he was survived, after 64 years of marriage, by his widow, Marion. The University of Rochester established the Harry W. Fulbright Prize in his honor.
