= Lynn Cooley =

Biologist and academic administrator

Academic background
- Education: Connecticut College (BA); University of Texas (PhD)
- Thesis: (1984)

Academic work
- Discipline: Biology

Lynn Cooley is the C. N. H. Long Professor of Genetics and Professor of Cell Biology and of Molecular, Cellular, and Developmental Biology. She has served as the Dean of the Graduate School of Arts and Sciences since 2014, and Vice Provost for Postdoctoral Affairs since 2021 at Yale University. Her current research focuses on understanding the function of the intercellular bridges that connect germline cells (which develop into eggs/oocytes or sperm) and on the regulated production of long proteins in specific tissues.

== Education and career ==
Cooley earned her PhD at the University of Texas in 1984, her BA in Zoology at Connecticut College in 1976, and held a postdoctoral appointment at the Carnegie Institution. She was elected Fellow of the American Association for the Advancement of Science in 2012. Cooley became Dean of the Graduate School of Arts and Sciences in 2014, and Vice Provost for Postdoctoral Affairs in 2021.

== Research ==
Cooley is a developmental cell biologist who works on gametogenesis, studying germline cells and the intercellular bridges that connect them while they develop. She is specifically interested in the process of incomplete cytokinesis. She uses the fruit fly, Drosophila melanogaster, as a model organism for her research.

== Selected publications ==
- Filamins as integrators of cell mechanics and signalling. TP Stossel, J Condeelis, L Cooley, JH Hartwig, A Noegel, M Schleicher, et al. Nature reviews: Molecular cell biology 2 (2), 138–145 (2001).
