= Sarah Demers =

American physicist

- Other name: Sarah Marie Demers Konezny
- Education: Harvard University; University of Rochester
- Scientific career
- Workplaces: Roberts Wesleyan University; SLAC National Accelerator Laboratory; CERN; Yale University
- Thesis: A measurement of BR(t -->[tau nuq)] (2004)
- Doctoral advisor: Kevin McFarland

Sarah Demers is an American experimental particle physicist, Professor of Physics, and Chair of the Department of Physics at Yale University. Her research focuses on using charged leptons, particularly tau leptons and muons, to search for physics beyond the Standard Model. She is a member of the ATLAS collaboration at CERN's Large Hadron Collider and the Mu2e experiment at Fermilab.

== Early life and education ==
Demers grew up as the daughter of a pastor, which gave her a sense of warmth and adaptability that later aided her in career. She displayed an early interest in science, though her specific focus on physics which solidified during her high school years. A teacher recognized her aptitude and encouraged her to consider it as a career path, which has not previously occurred to her.

Demers graduated from Phillips Andover Academy in 1994. Demers has an A.B. in Physics from Harvard University (1999). In 2001 she received an M.A. from the University of Rochester, and in 2005 she earned her Ph.D. from the University of Rochester. At Rochester, her doctoral advisor was Kevin McFarland.

After her doctorate, Demers taught for two years as an assistant professor at Roberts Wesleyan University. She then held a postdoctoral position at the SLAC National Accelerator Laboratory, during which time she was based at CERN in Geneva, Switzerland. Demers joined the Yale faculty in 2009.

When Sarah is not working, teaching, or researching, she is spending time with her family consisting of her two children and her husband. She also enjoys running and training for races, cycling, and swimming.

== Research ==
As an undergraduate she worked in the laboratory of Melissa Franklin and made sheets of gold-coated Mylar into detectors for tracking elemental particles. Her work examines charged particles to find new methods in physics beyond the accepted Standard Model. Demers was part of the team who discovered the Higgs boson, and her work is conducted at the Large Hadron Collider.

At Yale Wright Laboratory, Demers's group has responsibilities in the ATLAS collaboration for data quality and detector upgrades, including construction of elements of the ATLAS tracker upgrade for the High-Luminosity LHC. On the Mu2e experiment, her group is engaged in trigger system development, and she serves on the Mu2e publications board.

== Physics and Dance ==
Demers collaborates with Emily Coates, director of the Yale Dance Studies Curriculum, on interdisciplinary work connecting physics and dance. They co-teach a course on the Physics of Dance at Yale and co-authored Physics and Dance (Yale University Press, 2019), which was reviewed in Nature and Physics Today. Demers appeared in Coates's 2015 performance Incarnations.

== Selected publications ==
- Coates, Emily; Demers, Sarah (2019). Physics and dance. New Haven. ISBN 978-0-300-24063-4. OCLC 1076873286.
- Particle Data Group; Workman, R L; Burkert, V D; Crede, V; Klempt, E; Thoma, U; Tiator, L; Agashe, K; Aielli, G; Allanach, B C; Amsler, C; Antonelli, M; Aschenauer, E C; Asner, D M; Baer, H (2022-08-08). "Review of Particle Physics". Progress of Theoretical and Experimental Physics. 2022 (8): 083C01. doi:10.1093/ptep/ptac097. hdl:20.500.11850/571164. ISSN 2050-3911.
- Atlas Collaboration (2012-06-26). "Search for the Standard Model Higgs boson in the H → τ + τ − decay mode in √s = 7 TeV pp collisions with ATLAS". Journal of High Energy Physics. 2012 (9). arXiv:1206.5971v1. doi:10.1007/JHEP09(2012)070. S2CID 256011890.

== Awards and honors ==
- In 2011 Demers received an early career award from the United States' Department of Energy.
- Demers has also received a US ATLAS Fellowship and the Yale Provost Teaching Award.
- She was named a Fellow of the American Physical Society in 2023, "for important contributions to tau lepton triggering and identification and using the tau signature in the study of Higgs production and decay, and for important leadership both within the ATLAS collaboration and the broader physics community".
