= Arthur Williams Wright =

American physicist (1836–1915)

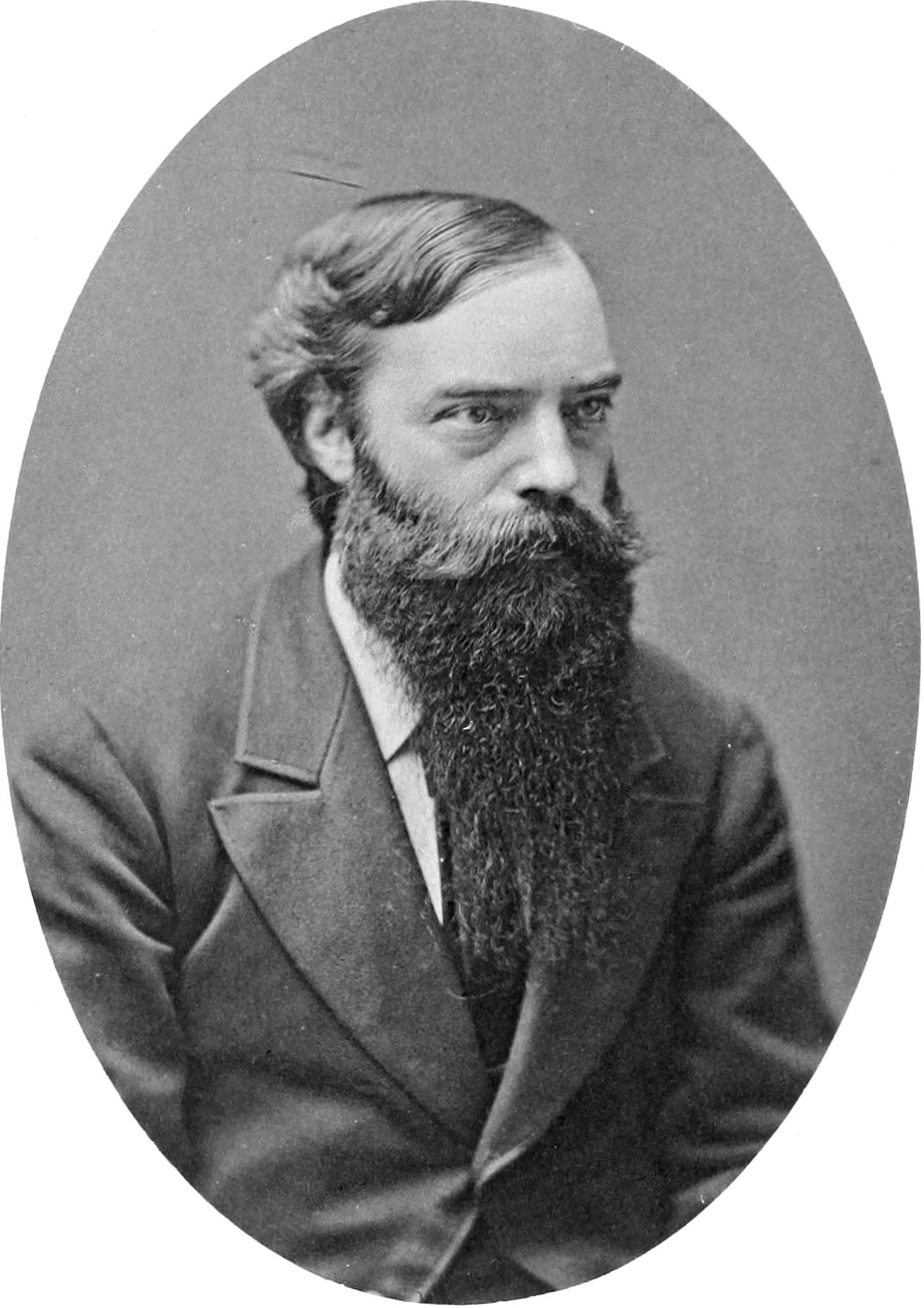
- Portrait of Wright as a Yale professor, c. 1872–1879
- Born: September 8, 1836; Lebanon, Connecticut, U.S.
- Died: December 19, 1915 (aged 79); New Haven, Connecticut, U.S.
- Resting place: Grove Street Cemetery
- Education: Yale College (BA, PhD)
- Spouse: Susan Forbes Silliman
- Scientific career
- Fields: Physics
- Institutions: Williams College; Yale University
- Thesis: Having given the velocity and direction of motion of a meteor on entering the atmosphere of the earth, to determine its orbit about the sun, taking into account the attractions of both these bodies (1861)
- Doctoral advisor: Hubert Newton
- Other academic advisors: Robert Bunsen; Gustav Kirchhoff; Heinrich Magnus; August von Hofmann

Arthur Williams Wright (September 8, 1836 – December 19, 1915) was an American physicist. Wright spent most of his scientific career at Yale University, where he received the first science Ph.D. awarded outside of Europe. His research, which ranged from electricity to astronomy, produced the first X-ray image and experimented with Röntgen rays. He also proved instrumental in securing funding for the first dedicated physics laboratory building in the United States, the Sloane Physical Laboratory.

== Biography ==
Wright was born in Lebanon, Connecticut, to Jesse Wright and Harriet Williams. He attended Bacon Academy in Colchester, Connecticut, then graduated from Yale College in 1859. In 1861, he completed a dissertation on satellite mechanics at Yale under the direction of Hubert Newton, although by the 1960s, the full text of the dissertation was believed to be lost.

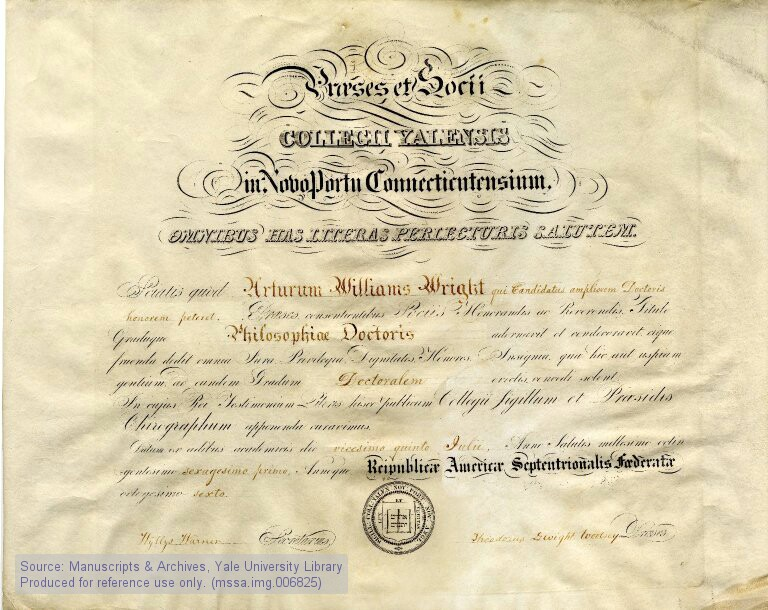
Wright's 1861 PhD diploma

For his work, Wright, received a Ph.D., one of the first three awarded by an American university. The other two were given to James Morris Whiton and Eugene Schuyler by Yale on the same occasion.

He spent two years as a collaborator on the new edition of Webster's Dictionary edited by Yale President Noah Porter. After, he became a tutor at Yale, first of Latin from 1863 to 1866 and then natural philosophy from 1866 to 1867. He also studied the law and was admitted to the bar in 1868, although he never practiced law. From 1868 to 1869, he studied in Germany at the University of Heidelberg and in Berlin.

After serving as Professor of Physics and Chemistry at Williams College from 1869 to 1872, he returned to Yale, first as Professor of Molecular Physics and Chemistry until 1887. In 1883, Yale was able to open the first laboratory in the country dedicated to physics research (the Sloane Physics Laboratory) because of Wright's influence and friendship with Henry T. Sloane and Thomas C. Sloane, siblings and Yale alumni. In 1911, a second Sloane Laboratory, also endowed by the Sloanes, was the first building completed on Science Hill. They also endowed a fellowship for graduate students at the laboratory. From 1887 until his retirement in 1906, he was professor of experimental physics.

On January 27, 1896, Wright produced an X-ray photograph, barely a month after Wilhelm Röntgen's seminal paper On A New Kind Of Rays was published on December 28, 1895. This was the first X-ray image produced in the country. He contributed numerous scientific papers, chiefly on astronomical and electrical subjects, to various publications. He was a fellow of the Royal Astronomical Society of Great Britain and of the American Association for the Advancement of Science as well as a member of the National Academy of Sciences, the American Philosophical Society, and the American Physical Society.

Arthur W. Wright put various objects under an x-ray.

On October 7, 1875, he married Susan Forbes Silliman, the oldest daughter of Benjamin Silliman Jr., a professor of chemistry at Yale. They had three children, Susan, Dorothy and Arthur. His wife died on February 17, 1890. He retired in 1906 and died at his home in New Haven on December 19, 1915.

== Experiments with Röntgen rays ==
In 1896, Wright had been experimenting with Crookes tube of spherical shape to generate long exposure x-ray photographs. He believed the cathode rays exuded in the sphere were dynamically different from those discovered by Philipp Lenard only a year earlier. For the future, Wright intended to research aluminum's behavior under an x-ray and its effect paired with an electric current. Wright saw the possibility of using the rays for surgical and medical fields, predicting the rise of x-ray technology.

In 1966, Yale University opened the Wright Nuclear Structure Laboratory (WNSL), naming it for him. WNSL was re-purposed and renamed the Yale Wright Laboratory (Wright Lab) in 2017.

== Bibliography ==
- Wright, Arther Williams (1870). "On a Peculiar Form of Discharge between Poles of the Electrical Machine". American Journal of Science. 49.
- ——. "On certain Forms of Electrical Discharge in the Air". American Journal of Science.
- —— (1872). "On simple Apparatus for the production of Ozone with Electricity of high tension". American Journal of Science. 4 (19): 26–29. Bibcode:1872AmJS....4...26W. doi:10.2475/ajs.s3-4.19.26. S2CID 134427039.
- —— (1872). "On the action of Ozone upon Vulcanized Caoutchoue". American Journal of Science. 4.
- —— (1874). "On the Oxidation of Alcohol and Ether by Ozone". American Journal of Science. 7 (39): 184–188. Bibcode:1874AmJS....7..184W. doi:10.2475/ajs.s3-7.39.184. S2CID 102076227.
- —— (1874). "On the Polarization of the Zodiacal Light". American Journal of Science. 8.
- —— (1874). "On the Spectrum of the Zodiacal Light". American Journal of Science. 8.
- —— (1875). "Examination of Gases from the Meteorite of February 12, 1875". American Journal of Science. 10.
- —— (1881). "On the Gaseous Substances contained in 'the Smoky Quartz of Branchville, Conn". American Journal of Science. 30.
