= CUORE =

Cryogenic Underground Observatory for Rare Events

Coordinates: 42°27′N 13°34′E

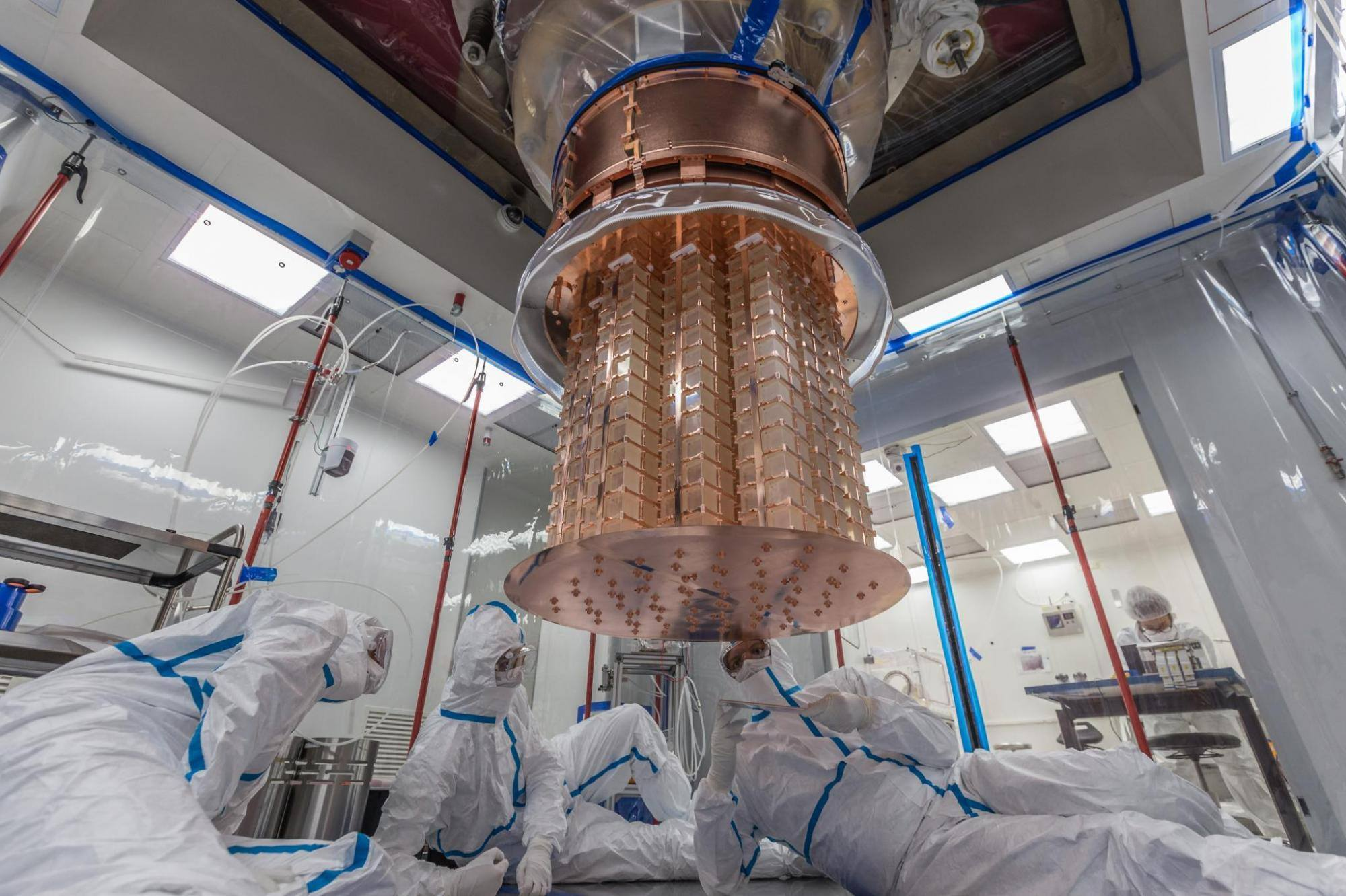
CUORE experiment inaugurated October 23, 2017

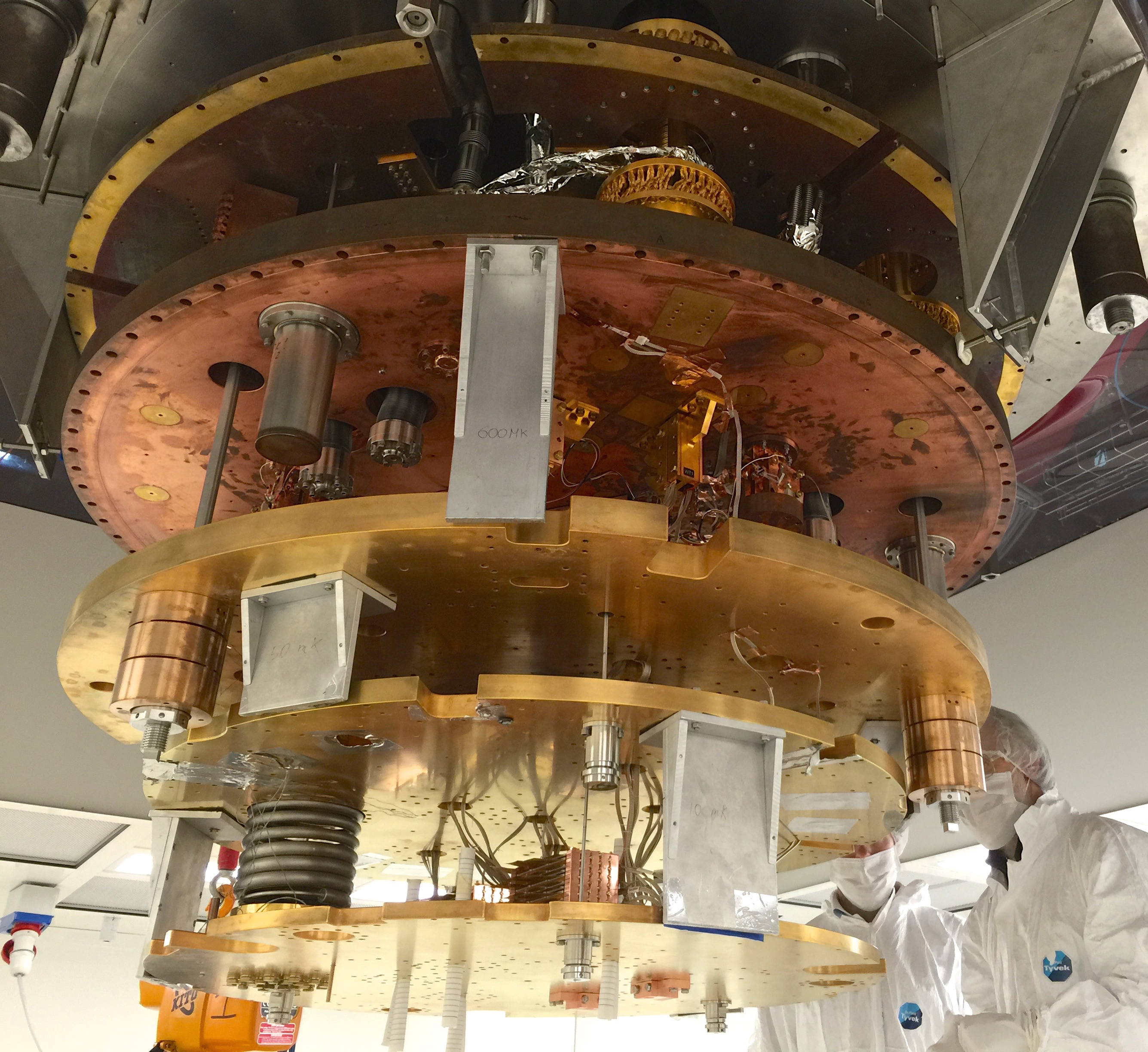
The CUORE cryostat under construction in October 2014.

The Cryogenic Underground Observatory for Rare Events (CUORE) – also cuore (Italian for 'heart'; [ˈkwɔːre]) – is a particle physics experiment located underground at the Laboratori Nazionali del Gran Sasso in Assergi, Italy. CUORE was designed primarily as a search for neutrinoless double beta decay in ^{130}Te, a process that has never been observed. It uses tellurium dioxide (TeO_{2}) crystals as both the source of the decay and as bolometers to detect the resulting electrons. CUORE searches for the characteristic signal of neutrinoless double beta decay, a small peak in the observed energy spectrum around the known decay energy; for ^{130}Te, this is Q = 2527.518 ± 0.013 keV. CUORE can also search for signals from dark matter candidates, such as axions and WIMPs.

An observation of neutrinoless double beta decay would conclusively show that neutrinos are Majorana fermions; that is, they are their own antiparticles. This is relevant to many topics in particle physics, including lepton number conservation, nuclear structure, and neutrino masses and properties.

The CUORE collaboration involves physicists from several countries, primarily from the United States and Italy. CUORE is funded by the Istituto Nazionale di Fisica Nucleare of Italy, the United States Department of Energy, and the National Science Foundation of the United States.

In September 2014, as part of the testing of the CUORE dilution refrigerator, scientists in the CUORE collaboration cooled a copper vessel with a volume of one cubic meter to 6 mK (0.006 K, −273.144 °C) for 15 days, setting a record for the lowest temperature in the known natural universe over such a large contiguous volume.

== Detectors ==
The CUORE detectors are TeO_{2} crystals used as low heat capacity bolometers, arranged into towers and cooled in a large cryostat to approximately 10 mK with a dilution refrigerator. The detectors are isolated from environmental thermal, electromagnetic, and other particle backgrounds by ultrapure low-radioactivity shielding. Temperature spikes from electrons emitted in Te double beta decays are collected for spectrum analysis. The detectors are calibrated using ^{232}Th, the first element in a long decay chain that includes several prominent gamma rays up to 2615 keV.

For the construction of CUORE, the collaboration followed several procedures to minimize radioactive contamination that can cause the detectors to register background events at energies close to the energy released in neutrinoless double beta decay. The crystals were grown by the Shanghai Institute of Ceramics at the Chinese Academy of Sciences with strict radiopurity requirements. The crystals are held in place by PTFE support in towers constructed from oxygen-free high thermal conductivity copper and were assembled under nitrogen inside gloveboxes in cleanrooms. Copper, lead, low-radioactivity ancient Roman lead, and borated polyethylene are used to shield the detectors. Coincidence algorithms are also used to reject events that caused multiple channels to trigger, such as would be caused by an incoming cosmic ray muon or a gamma ray that Compton scatters in multiple crystals.

== History ==
Cuoricino was the first large-scale bolometer tower used for a rare event search and was operated from 2003 to 2008. It had 62 TeO_{2} crystals (11 kg of ^{130}Te), with some crystals enriched in ^{130}Te and others with natural isotopic abundance, and some slightly larger and some smaller crystals. The tower was similar in construction to the CUORE tower, and was shielded with copper, lead, and Roman lead. Cuoricino was operated near 8 mK in a relatively small dilution refrigerator.

Using the results of Cuoricino, the final details of the CUORE detector towers were finalized, and an assembly sequence was set up for the construction of these 19 towers. CUORE-0 was the first detector tower produced on this assembly line. It had 52 improved TeO_{2} crystals in a copper tower with better surface purity and significantly reduced radon and other contamination. It was operated in the Cuoricino cryostat from 2013 to 2015 as a first test of the new CUORE assembly procedures as the assembly of the CUORE towers was completed.

CUORE is a scaled-up version of CUORE-0, hosted in a new custom-built cryostat capable of supporting a detector with a mass of approximately one ton. It contains 988 5×5×5 cm^{3} crystals, with 741 kg TeO_{2} (206 kg of ^{130}Te). The new cryostat was constructed from extremely radiopure materials, and a large Ancient Roman lead shield is used to shield the detectors . There is a 73-ton octagonal shield outside of the cryostat, constructed of lead and borated polyethlene, to reduce the number of environmental gamma rays and neutrons reaching the detector. Due to the large number of discrete detectors, cosmic ray muons can be easily excluded by rejecting events that occur simultaneously in multiple detectors.

The CUORE towers were installed in the cryostat in August 2016, and data taking with CUORE began in May 2017.

== Results ==
Cuoricino took data from April 2003 to June 2008. Final results using 19.75 kg·y of ^{130}Te exposure set world-leading 90% limits on the ^{130}Te 0νββ half-life of T 0ν
½ > 2.8 × 10^{24} yr, with a background of 0.18 ± 0.01/(keV·kg·yr) near the 0νββ decay energy. Axion mass limits were also set, consistent with other experiments.

The first paper detailing the initial performance of CUORE-0 was published in August 2014 using data taken March to September 2013, with 7.1 kg·yr exposure, showing backgrounds reduced by a factor of 6 compared to CUORICINO and an energy resolution of 5.7 keV. A limit on 0νββ was presented in April 2015, combining 9.8 kg·yr of CUORE-0 exposure with the Cuoricino exposure to set a new limit of T 0ν
½ > 4.0×10^{24} yr.

CUORE has a background goal of 0.01·counts/(keV·kg·y) in the 0νββ region of interest with an energy resolution goal of 5.0 keV. After five years, CUORE is estimated to have a 90% CL half-life sensitivity to 0νββ of 9.5 × 10^{25} yr, and an effective Majorana neutrino mass sensitivity of 0.05–0.13 eV (depending on the nuclear matrix elements used).

First results of the full CUORE experiment were published 2018 finding no evidence for neutrinoless double beta decay setting a 90% CI Bayesian lower limit for the lifetime of $T_{\beta\beta}^{0\nu}>1.5\cdot 10^{25}$ years. In 2020 and 2022 new limits were given at $T_{\beta\beta}^{0\nu}>3.2\cdot 10^{25}$ and $T_{\beta\beta}^{0\nu}>2.2\cdot 10^{25}$ years at the same confidence level. In 2026, the limit was increased to $T_{\beta\beta}^{0\nu}>3.5\cdot 10^{25}$ years.

== Research and development ==
CUPID (CUORE Upgrade With Particle Identification) a research and development project for the CUORE detector. Several research groups worldwide are working to develop materials for this upgrade. CUPID aims to use new detector materials in the same cryostat as CUORE.

ABSuRD (A Background Surface Rejection Detector) research and development project for the CUORE detector. The project aims to develop a scintillating bolometer with the ability to veto ionizing background radiation.
