= Oliver Keith Baker =

American experimental particle physicist

- Born: 18 July 1959 (age 67); McGehee, Arkansas
- Education: Stanford University; Massachusetts Institute of Technology
- Known for: Higgs boson discovery (ATLAS); Dark sector searches Quantum information in HEP
- Awards: Edward Alexander Bouchet Award (2002); Arkansas Black Hall of Fame (2006); Elmer Imes Award
- Scientific career
- Fields: Particle physics Astrophysics
- Workplaces: Yale University; Hampton University; ATLAS Collaboration
- Doctoral advisor: Arthur B. C. Walker Jr.

Oliver Keith Baker (born July 18, 1959) is an American experimental particle physicist and astrophysicist, the D. Allan Bromley Professor of Physics at Yale University. He is best known for his contributions to the discovery of the Higgs boson as a member of the ATLAS Collaboration at the Large Hadron Collider, his work on dark matter and dark sector physics, and pioneering research connecting quantum information science to high-energy particle physics. In 2002, he won the Edward Alexander Bouchet Award of the American Physical Society: "For his contribution to nuclear and particle physics; for building the infrastructure to do these measurements; and for being active in outreach activities, both locally and nationally." In 2006, he became the first tenured African American faculty member in the Yale physics department.

== Early life and education ==
Oliver Keith Baker was born in McGehee, Arkansas in 1959 to parents Oliver and Yvonne Baker, and grew up in Memphis, Tennessee.

Keith Baker received his B.S. in physics from the Massachusetts Institute of Technology (MIT) in 1981. Baker completed both his M.S. in physics and mathematics in 1984 and his Ph.D. in physics in 1987 from Stanford working on experimental nuclear physics.

== Career ==
Baker completed a post-doc at Los Alamos National Laboratory from 1986 to 1988 conducting research on muon catalyzed fusion, where he made the first measurement of the muon sticking probability in that process. After his post-doc, Baker joined Hampton University in 1989 as an assistant professor in the physics department with a joint appointment as a staff scientist at Thomas Jefferson National Accelerator Facility. At Hampton, he also made the first accurate measurement of the elementary amplitudes in kaon electroproduction. In 2000, he was named Endowed University Professor of Physics, and in 2002 became the founding director of the Center for the Study of the Origin and Structure of Matter (CSOM), a National Science Foundation Physics Frontier Center partnering Hampton University, Norfolk State University, and North Carolina A&T State University.

In 2006, Baker began professorship at Yale University where he was the first tenured African American faculty member in the physics department. In 2010, Baker became director of Yale's A. W. Wright Nuclear Structure Laboratory, which includes state-of-the-art facilities for the study of neutrinos, dark matter and fundamental physics. In February 2021 he was appointed to Yale's D. Allan Bromley Professorship of Physics.

== Research ==
=== ATLAS and the Higgs boson ===
Baker is a member of the ATLAS Collaboration, which in 2012 discovered the Higgs boson predicted by the Standard Model. He led the construction of components of the ATLAS Transition Radiation Tracker (TRT) and was part of the team that carried out the machine learning analysis contributing to the discovery. He serves as the Yale ATLAS team leader and Yale ATLAS Institute representative.

=== Dark sector searches ===
Baker originated the ATLAS analysis searching for dark sector phenomena through exotic decays of the Higgs boson to four leptons, setting new limits on light gauge bosons beyond the Standard Model. He has also studied photon–paraphoton kinetic mixing as a possible explanation for the propagation of ultra-high-energy cosmic rays from BL Lacertae objects.

=== Quantum information science in high-energy physics ===
With Dmitri Kharzeev, Baker co-pioneered the application of quantum information concepts to LHC collisions, demonstrating a connection between quantum entanglement and the apparent thermalization observed in particle production in proton–proton collisions. He is the academic editor and co-author of the book Quantum Entanglement in High Energy Physics (IntechOpen).

=== Axion searches ===
Baker's group is involved in the search for axion dark matter at Yale's Wright Laboratory. The group is contributing detector development to the Axion Longitudinal Plasma HAloscope (ALPHA) experiment, which employs a novel plasma haloscope to search for higher-mass axions.

== Awards and honors ==
- Fellow of the American Academy of Arts and Sciences (elected 2022)
- Fellow of the American Physical Society (elected 2021), for "leadership in the construction of the ATLAS TRT tracker and its use in innovative searches for new physics and new phenomena, including the use of the Higgs as a probe of the dark sector"
- U.S. ATLAS Distinguished Researcher (2017)
- Inducted into Arkansas Black Hall of Fame (2006)
- Edward Alexander Bouchet Award from the American Physical Society (2002)
- Elmer Imes Award for Outstanding Research from the National Society of Black Physicists
- E. L. Hamm, Sr. Distinguished Teaching Award
