= Yale Wright Laboratory =

Facility and research community at Yale University in New Haven, CT

Yale Wright Laboratory (Wright Lab) is a facility and research community at Yale University in New Haven, CT, within the Yale Department of Physics. Wright Lab enables researchers to develop, build and use research instrumentation for experiments in nuclear, particle and astrophysics across the globe that investigate the invisible universe. Before a transformation to its current purpose in 2017, Wright Lab was known as the Arthur W. Wright Nuclear Structure Laboratory (WNSL). WNSL housed the first "Emperor" tandem Van de Graaff heavy ion accelerator and was founded by D. Allan Bromley, the "father of heavy-ion physics," in 1961 (see History, below, for more information).

== Facilities ==
Wright Lab is named for Arthur Williams Wright, who was awarded one of the first three Ph.D.s in science in the Americas (all of which were awarded by Yale University in 1861). The building complex joins two buildings that were constructed and renovated at different times, for different purposes, yet always related to Yale physics research.

- The first part of the complex (what is now called the Wright Lab Connector) was built sometime before or during the 1940s and housed an electron linear accelerator (linac).
- The second part of the complex (what is now called Wright Lab West) was built in the 1950s to house the heavy ion linear accelerator (HILAC).
- The third part of the complex (what is now called Wright Lab) was built in the 1960s, with all three buildings joined together as the A. W. Wright Nuclear Structure Laboratory, to house and operate the Yale MP-1 "Emperor" tandem Van de Graaff heavy ion accelerator.
- The entire complex was renovated from 2013-17 to transform the facility into its current purpose and re-named as the Yale Wright Laboratory (Wright Lab).

== History ==
The history of Wright Lab begins with the creation of accelerator physics in the 1920s, and continues with the creation of the Arthur W. Wright Nuclear Structure Laboratory (WNSL) to operate the Yale MP-1 "Emperor" tandem Van de Graaff heavy ion accelerator from 1966 until 2011, and continues further with its transformation into the new Wright Lab, which was dedicated in 2017, to enable Wright Lab's research program in nuclear, particle and astrophysics. A brief timeline is below.

Timeline of Yale Wright Laboratory History
1926	Earnest Lawrence started forming the concept underlying the cyclotron in 1926, when he was an instructor at Yale.
1930s	A version of Lawrence’s cyclotron was built at Yale by Earnest Pollard and Howard Schultz.
1940s	An early linear accelerator (linac) for electrons was built at Yale in the 1940’s by Schultz and Carol Montgomery.
1950s	A heavy ion linac was designed and built at Yale in the 1950’s by Robert Beringer and others, with physics results starting in 1958.
1961	D. Allan Bromley initiates design of the first MP (Emperor) tandem electrostatic accelerator.
1962	Yale submits a proposal for construction of Emperor accelerator to Atomic Energy Commission: Construction contract signed with High Voltage Engineering, Dec. 27, 1962.
1964	A research contract for $781,000 was awarded to Yale University and D.A. Bromley for the Emperor Tandem Van de Graaff Research Program.
1964-66	A. W. Wright Nuclear Structure Laboratory (WNSL) and the first MP tandem accelerator (MP-1) were constructed at Yale. Dedication October 5, 1966. In the following years, several other MP accelerators were built in North America and in Europe.
1965-67	Joint Study program involving WNSL at Yale and T.J. Watson Laboratory of IBM results in state-of-the-art data acquisition and control system at Wright Laboratory.
1967	First WNSL research papers published.
1974	The performance of MP tandem accelerator was upgraded through installation of new stainless steel acceleration tubes.
1978	A proposal for conversion of Yale MP tandem accelerator to STU status was submitted to Department of Energy.
1982	DOE approves MP-ESTU conversion in July 1982.
1983	The New York Times publishes an article about the upgrade on August 4, 1983.
1985	Research activity with MP tandem accelerator was terminated May 29, 1985 and conversion program was initiated.
1987	Terminal potential of 22.4 million volts was reached on July 4, 1987. Dedication of ESTU-1 accelerator facility, August 7, 1987.
2011	Operation of the ESTU tandem ends.
2013	Decommissioning of the ESTU and associated equipment begins. The Wright Lab’s new Director, Karsten Heeger, begins renovations of the facility as well as a new research program in nuclear, particle and astrophysics.
2016	The newly renovated Wright Lab opens for personnel.
2017	The Wright Lab’s public Opening Ceremony is held on May 16, 2017.

=== Directors of WNSL and Wright Lab ===
Directors of WNSL and Wright Lab
Name	Years served
D. Allan Bromley	1961-1989
Peter Parker	1989-1995
Francesco Iachello	1995
Rick Casten	1995-2008
John W. Harris	2008-2010
O. Keith Baker	2010-2013
Karsten Heeger	2013–present
