= First Baptist Church of Tarrytown =

Historic church in New York, United States

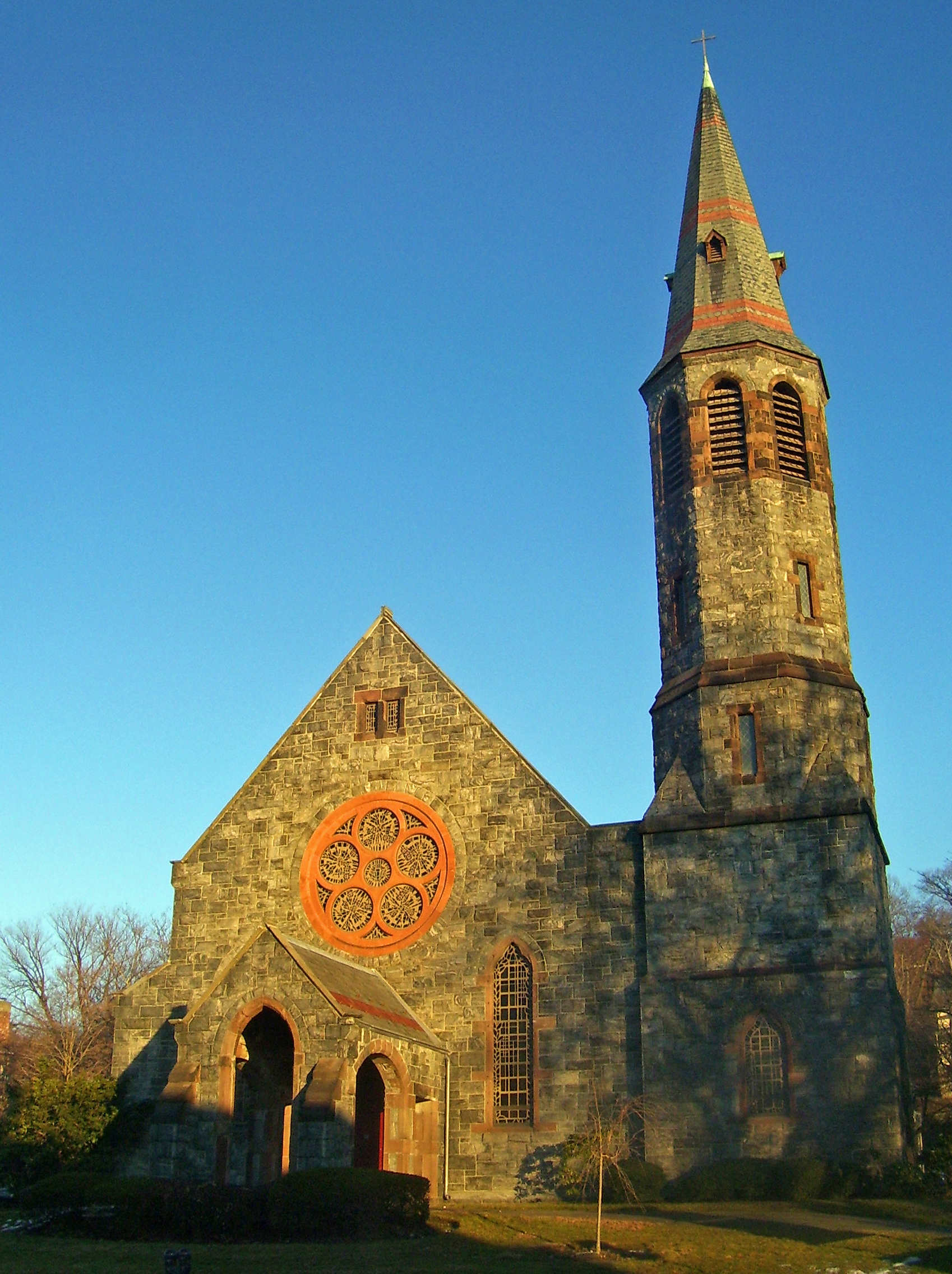
- West elevation, 2009

Religion
- Affiliation: Baptist
- Leadership: Pastor Nathan Norman
- Year consecrated: 1881

Location
- Location: Tarrytown, NY, USA
- Interactive map of First Baptist Church of Tarrytown
- Coordinates: 41°04′28″N 73°51′30″W

Architecture
- Architect: Russell Sturgis
- Style: Gothic Revival
- Groundbreaking: 1875
- Completed: 1881
- Construction cost: $10,000

Specifications
- Direction of façade: West
- Width: 75 feet (23 m)
- Spire: 1
- Spire height: 125 feet (38 m)
- Materials: Bluestone, brownstone, slate, wood, metal

U.S. National Register of Historic Places
- Added to NRHP: July 21, 1983
- NRHP Reference no.: 83001829

Website
- First Baptist Church of Tarrytown

The First Baptist Church of Tarrytown is located on South Broadway (U.S. Route 9) in Tarrytown, New York, United States. It is a stone building in the Victorian Gothic architectural style dating to the 1870s. In 1983 it and its rectory were listed on the National Register of Historic Places.

Congregants first met in the 1840s. The first church on the present site was erected in 1847. A quarter-century later Russell Sturgis was commissioned to design the present structure, which took five years to complete, including a detailed Gothic interior. It signaled Tarrytown's development as a suburb, especially after John D. Rockefeller and members of his family moved to the village and joined the church. They made possible some of its later enhancements, such as its landscaping and rectory, both added later.

== Buildings and grounds ==
The lot shared by the church and rectory is at the southeast corner of the intersection of South Broadway and East Elizabeth Street, on the southeast edge of downtown Tarrytown. Across the street is Christ Episcopal Church, an 1830s brick Gothic Revival structure also listed on the Register. The neighborhood is a mix of commercial, institutional and residential use. There is an affordable housing project to the southwest, single-family houses to the east, north and south along Broadway, and commercial buildings to the northwest. The terrain slopes westward towards the Hudson River.

=== Exterior ===
The church is a single-story structure of ashlar-patterned bluestone with brownstone trim, topped with a gabled roof shingled in slate. Its main block is three bays wide on the east elevation, eleven on the north and nine on the west. A tower is attached to the southwest corner.

On the west (front) facade a small porte-cochère with brownstone columns, arched entries and buttresses shelters the main entrance. To its south is a lancet window. Above it is a large rose window. A narrow double casement window is in the gable apex. A bluestone chimney rises from the east end of the south wall of the nave.

The east end of the apse has four windows. Sheds with asphalt roofs line both north and south on the first floor; above them are the only plain glass windows on the structure. The north side has a porch with elongated Gothic columns topped by foliate capitals. Its ceiling has narrow, diagonal boards with dark stain.

There are four stages to the tower. Its base is square-shaped, with one central lancet window on the west complementing the larger one to its north on the main block. The second stage has no windows. At the third stage the tower becomes octagonal, with narrow casement windows in alternating facets. The elongated fourth stage has the same windows on the other facets at its bottom and round-arched louvered windows near the top with brownstone in between them. Atop the tower is a slender spire shingled in slate, pierced by four smaller copper-roofed gabled dormer windows. A copper finial and cross tops the spire.

=== Interior ===
The church's interior makes extensive use of Honduran mahogany carved with Gothic details. In the sanctuary it is used for the wainscoting, exposed hammerbeam rafters, organ screen and molded hood above the organ. The lectern and pulpit are original, as are the pews.

There is a stencilled cornice line border and large yellow sunflower between all but one of the rafters. The wooden screen across the back was added later and uses classical motifs. It has stained glass panels with dark oak surrounds and a denticulated cornice on top. Double doors in the center are topped with a pediment containing a clock.

The outside entrance to the base of the tower has been closed. It may be accessed instead via an entrance from the narthex. The space is used for storage. It retains its original hardwood narrow-board flooring and gas chandelier of brass and frosted glass with a Greek key design. A ladder leads to the upper stages of the tower.

North of the apse is a room called the lecture hall on the original plans. It has dark wooden walls and sliding doors, in contrast to the ceiling's golden oak curved rafters that converge at a decorative element. Other features include chamfered door stiles, wooden louvers for the stained-glass windows, and brass door hardware.

=== Rectory ===
The rectory is located to the south of the church. It is a two-story three-by-four-bay Roman brick structure with wooden trim and granite stringcourses, sills and lintels. Windows are double-hung sash. It is topped with a hipped roof shingled in red Vermont slate. One segmental-arched dormer window pierces each facet of the roof.

A raised veranda with slate roof extends the width of the west (front) facade. It is complemented by a porch on the north. Both are supported by narrow Doric columns. Similar classical detailing on the house includes a modillioned and bracketed cornice, Adamesque garlanded friezes, and terra cotta escutcheon on the second story. Inside it has two fireplaces of imported Italian marble on the first floor, and much of its original woodwork.

On the east is a one-story, two-bay garage of cinderblock, added later on. It is not considered contributing to the property's historic character. Landscaping includes a horse chestnut tree and pathways and drives done in the same Roman brick as the rectory.

== History ==
The history of the First Baptist Church goes through three eras: the years of its founding and rapid growth from the mid-19th century through the Civil War, when it met in several different places; the construction of the new church and the impact of the Rockefeller family; and the years since then.

=== 1840s–1873: Founding and early growth ===
In the 1840s, as Tarrytown grew eastward from the riverside where it had begun, the community became large enough to support several Protestant denominations. For Baptists of the time the nearest church was in Sing Sing, now Ossining, roughly ten miles (16 km) to the north along the Albany Post Road. A local congregation was finally organized in 1843, and recognized later that year as Beekman Baptist Church.

The next year they were able to hire a minister, and rent a building they named Beekman Chapel. Soon they had to abandon it due to financial problems, and a local Methodist minister offered his church in the meantime. Later in the year they bought a lot at Main and Washington and built their first church for $3,000 ($104,000 in modern dollars). It was renamed the First Baptist Church of Tarrytown.

Six years after its founding, the new church had grown more than fivefold, to 60 members. A revival that began in 1857 under William Wines, a pastor known for his abolitionism, almost tripled the church to 172 members by the end of the Civil War nine years later.

After a year without a pastor, David Reeves, a veteran of the Confederate Army, walked all the way to Tarrytown from Alabama to take the job in 1867. The 1844 church could no longer hold the congregation. After Reeves left in 1870, the congregation began to seriously consider a new building. Before Dr. George Stone took over as pastor in 1873, the current lot had been purchased.

=== 1873–1900: New church and Rockefeller patronage ===
By that time, a building committee had been formed and raised some of the money. Russell Sturgis, the architect and critic who received the commission, was at the peak of his creative years following his designs for two of Yale University's oldest dormitories, Farnam and Durfee halls. He was also designing another Victorian Gothic religious building, Battell Chapel for the campus. As a critic he had written for the journal New Path on the virtues of the Pre-Raphaelite movement in England as applied to architecture, calling for simple buildings of solid construction and expressive of purpose, qualities his First Baptist Church of Tarrytown would embody.

Sturgis worked closely with the building committee on his design. The beginning of construction had to wait until 1874 due to the financial uncertainties created by the previous year's banking crisis. The architect's plan adapted, calling for a five-year plan with separate construction timetables for the main block and spire. By summer 1875 enough of the foundation and walls had been laid to hold a cornerstone ceremony.

The committee began meeting in the new church a year later, and by the end of 1876 the sexton had taken up occupancy. At that time construction began on the spire. Costs of construction ultimately reached $100,000 ($3.34 million in modern dollars), well over the original budget, when the church was formally dedicated in 1881. Originally, the interior walls were completely covered by the stencilled designs that today remain only between the ceiling rafters

At the time the church stood out within Tarrytown, which had only incorporated as a village a decade earlier. Broadway was still unpaved, and the surrounding buildings were of a much smaller scale. First Baptist signalled that the village, once a riverside port town that served the farmers inland, was becoming a desirable residential suburb, a home away from the city for successful financiers and industrialists. In particular, the Gothic stylings of the church were well-suited to a community located on a river that had begun to be referred to as "America's Rhine". In 1888 it took delivery of its pipe organ.

Tarrytown's cachet was secured in the following decade when John D. Rockefeller, founder of Standard Oil and the wealthiest man in America, not only at that time but historically, built his Kykuit estate north of Tarrytown and settled there with his family. The Rockefellers, especially their patriarch, had remained devout Baptists as their fortune grew.

They became members of First Baptist, and their patronage was to prove beneficial to the church. The rectory was built south of the church in 1896 through the generosity of Almira Geraldine Goodsell, wife of William Rockefeller, John's younger brother. Other gifts from the family strengthened the church's spiritual work and enhanced its physical appearance. At the turn of the century John D. Rockefeller himself paid for the church's landscaping.

=== 1900–present: Later alterations ===
In the early 1910s the interior was converted from gas to electric lighting. Some of the original gas jets remain, and an original gas fixture, unused since then, still hangs in the base of the tower. In 1936 an electric organ replaced the original pipe organ. The stencilling on the interior was painted over in the 1950s, with the exception of the sunflower bands in between the ceiling rafters, which were too difficult to reach. At that time the rectory was also renovated, with the first-floor rooms converted to Sunday school classrooms and office space and the second floor becoming the pastor's apartment.

The screen that creates the narthex space in the church sanctuary was brought in from another church at some point. It uses classical detailing instead of the Gothic detailing that dominates the space. Two of its eight stained glass windows are believed to be Tiffany glass.

== Beliefs and programs ==
The church's creed affirms Scripture as the final authority over matters spiritual and temporal, the Holy Trinity, and the divinity of Christ. "[A]ll men are sinners by nature and by choice, and their salvation is received only through faith in the atoning death of Jesus Christ." This statement of the sola fide doctrine is followed by an explicit rejection of the notion that salvation can in any way come from good works.

The church describes itself as both part of the Church Universal and a local organization, "composed of regenerated, baptized believers voluntarily united for the purpose of worship." It believes that Christ commended two ordinances to the local churches: the Last Supper and baptism by immersion. The creed affirms the separation of church and state and its independence and self-governance by its elders.

In addition to hosting Sunday services the church runs several ministries and programs. There is a hospitality, doorkeepers and nursery program to offer support during the service. Youth and children's ministries teach Sunday school and run special Bible study classes for those groups. There are also men's and women's ministries. A missions committee organizes those activities, which have supported work from New York City and Montreal to Argentina and Japan. Other local outreach programs serve a local nursing home and foreign students at the EF International Academy nearby.

== See also ==
- National Register of Historic Places listings in northern Westchester County, New York
