= Ellen Battell Stoeckel =

American arts patron (1851–1939)

- Born: Ellen Mills Battell; March 10, 1851; Norfolk, Connecticut
- Died: May 5, 1939 (aged 88); Whitehouse, Norfolk, Connecticut
- Occupation: Philanthropist
- Known for: Founder of the Litchfield County Choral Union and Norfolk Chamber Music Festival
- Spouse(s): Frederick Peet Terry, Carl Stoeckel
- Children: Frederick Battell Terry died at 16
- Parents: Robbins Battell (father); Ellen Ryerson Mills (mother)
- Relatives: Joseph Battell, grandfather Gustave J. Stoeckel, father-in-law; John T. Terry, father-in-law; Roderick Terry, brother-in-law

Ellen Battell Stoeckel (1851–1939) was an American arts patron. Stoeckel had a long association with Yale University, music and her hometown of Norfolk, Connecticut. After her death her expansive estate, Whitehouse, was donated to the university to become a center for musical education.

== Biography ==
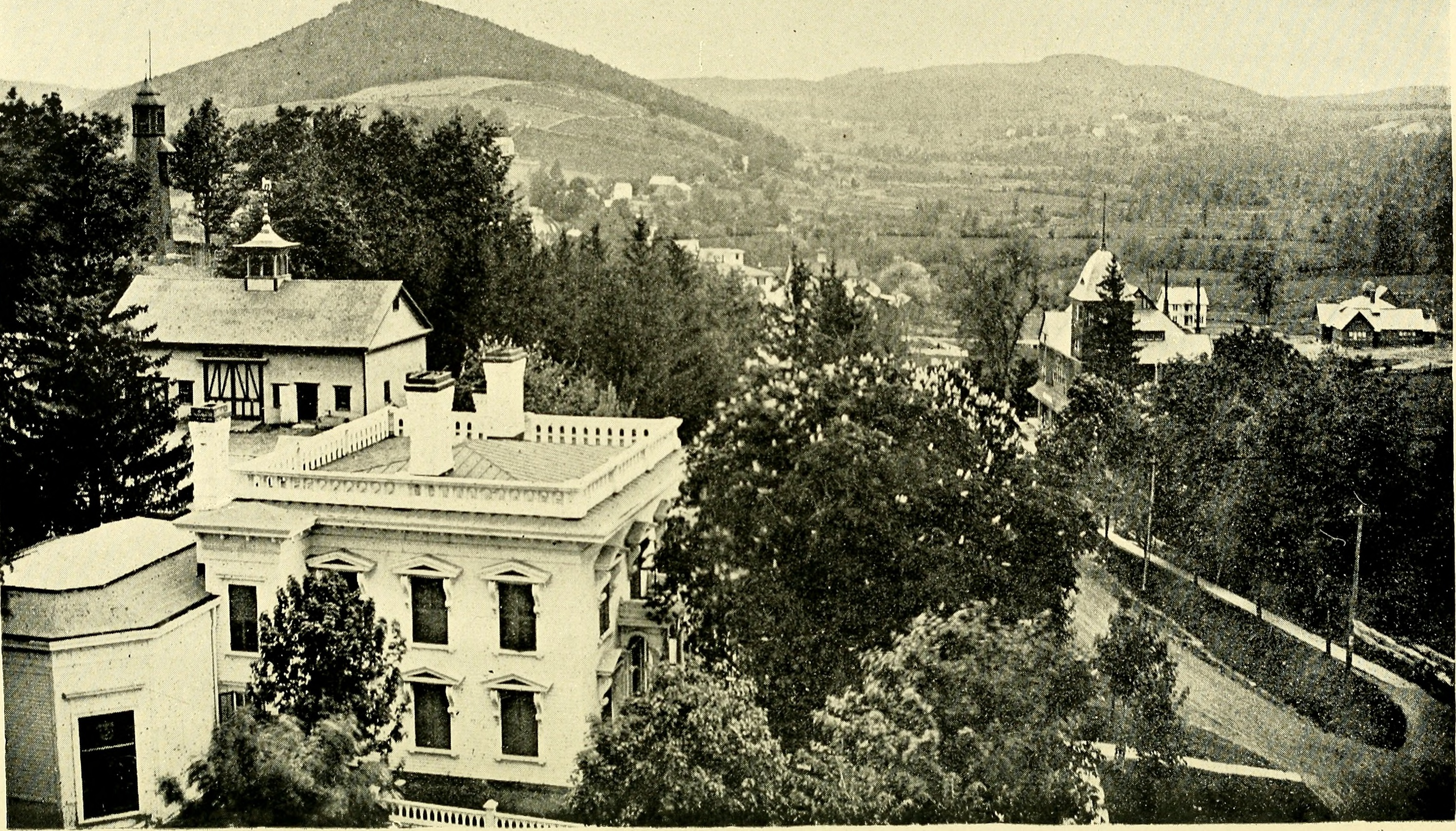
View of the Whitehouse (on left) in Norfolk, Connecticut, where Ellen Battell Stoeckel was born, lived and later bequeathed to Yale University after her death

Ellen Mills Battell was born in Norfolk, Connecticut in 1851. Battell's father, Robbins Battell, was the son of Joseph Battell, a prominent merchant and benefactor. Robbins Battell was a philanthropist and composer. Her mother, Ellen Ryerson Mills, died shortly after giving birth to her. As a child, Ellen Battell was trained in music, learning piano.

=== Marriage and motherhood ===
In 1873 Battell married Frederick Peet Terry, son of John T. Terry. The couple had one son, Frederick Peet Terry. Ellen Battell Terry was widowed the next year, and returned to Connecticut to live with her father. Ellen and John's son Frederick died in 1890 at age 16.

=== Mrs. Carl Stoeckel and music patronage ===
Ellen Battell later married Carl Stoeckel, the son of Yale music professor, Gustave J. Stoeckel. In 1898, Ellen Stoeckel founded the Norfolk Glee Club, to honor her late father's love of music. In 1899 Stoeckel and her husband founded the Litchfield County Choral Union, which would later lead to the creation of the Norfolk Annual Music Festival. The Norfolk Annual Music Festival hosted a number of America's and Europe's most prominent musical artists and performers, and commissioned new works.

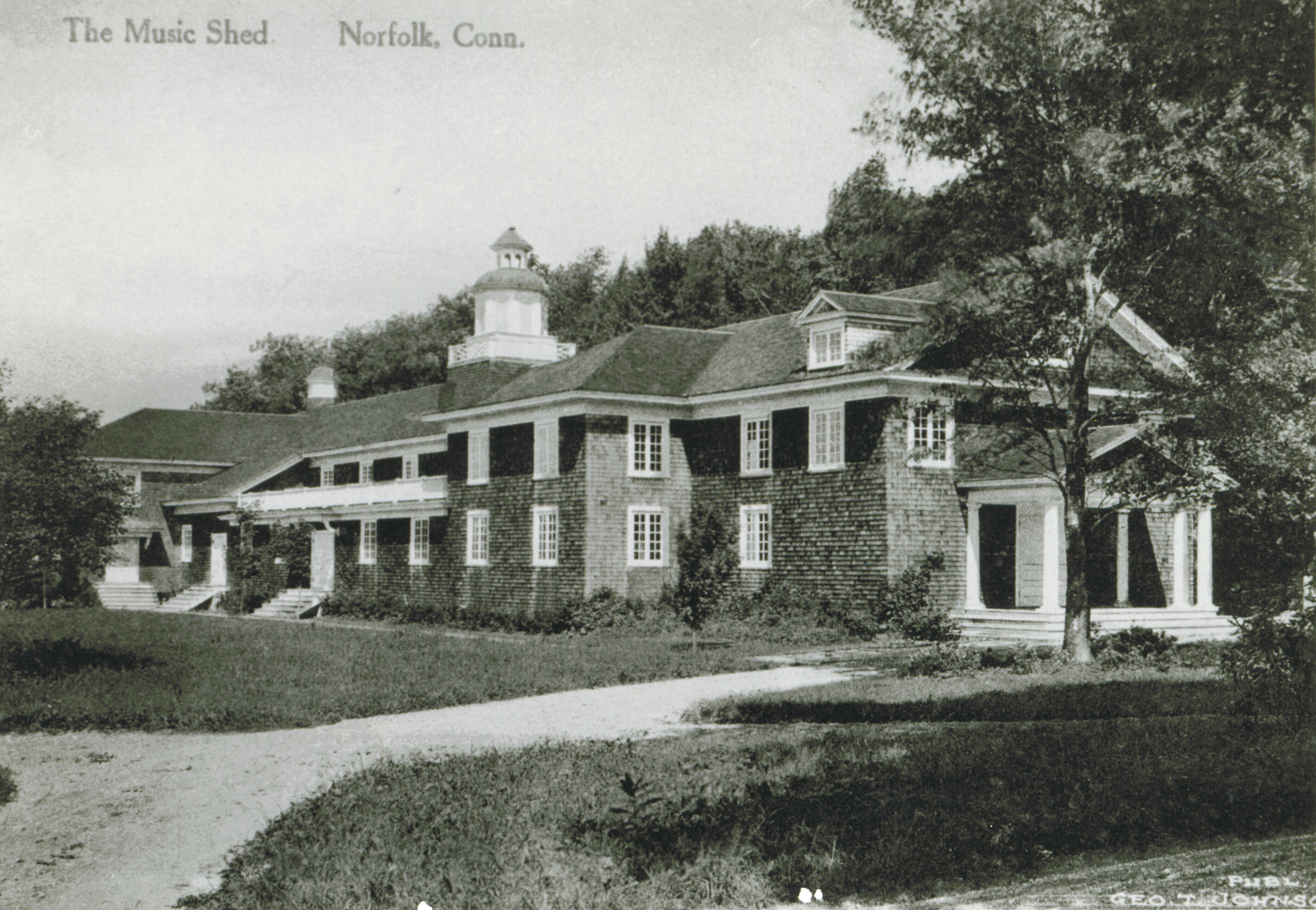
The Music Shed in Norfolk, home of the Norfolk Chamber Music Festival

In 1906, Ellen Battel Stoeckel received an honorary music degree from Yale. In 1925, she donated the Haystack Mountain Tower and surrounding land to the community to become Haystack Mountain Park.

=== Death and legacy ===
Stoeckel died at age 88 on May 5, 1939. After her death, she gave her estate Whitehouse, to Yale University. Yale established the Norfolk Music School on the property, where the university continues to host music education. Today, the Norfolk Chamber Music Festival and the Litchfield County Choral Union continue to offer opportunities for music in Norfolk.

== See also ==
- The Last Moments of John Brown, painting commissioned by Ellen Battell's father and later donated by Ellen Battell to the Metropolitan Museum of Art
- Robbins Stoeckel House
