= Hubert A. Newton =

American astronomer and scientist

H. A. Newton
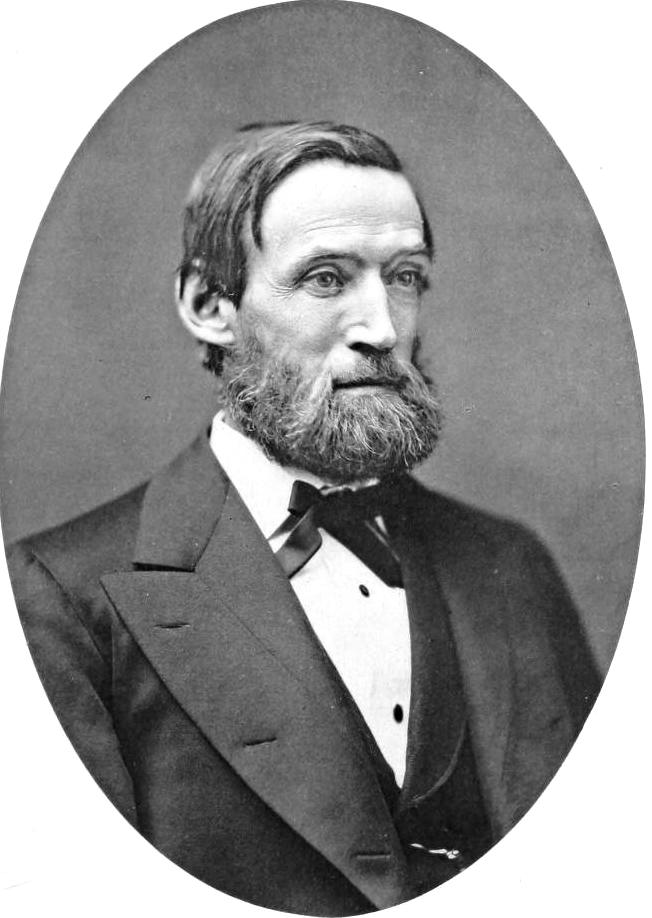
- Hubert Anson Newton, around 1879
- Born: 19 March 1830; Sherburne, New York
- Died: 12 August 1896 (aged 66); New Haven, Connecticut, United States
- Education: Yale University
- Known for: Science of meteors
- Awards: Smith gold medal
- Scientific career
- Fields: Astronomer and mathematician
- Workplaces: Yale University
- Academic advisors: Michel Chasles
- Doctoral students: E. H. Moore; Josiah Willard Gibbs; Charles Newton Little; Arthur W. Wright

Hubert Anson Newton FRS HFRSE (19 March 1830 – 12 August 1896), usually cited as H. A. Newton, was an American astronomer and mathematician, noted for his research on meteors.

== Biography ==
Newton was born at Sherburne, New York, and graduated from Yale in 1850 with a B.A. He continued his studies independently in New Haven and at home, due to the absence of Anthony D. Stanley, the primary professor of mathematics at Yale who was at the time dying of tuberculosis. Newton took up the position of tutor in January, 1853, a few months before Stanley's death, and served as the principal instructor of mathematics until 1855 when he was appointed professor of mathematics. He deferred taking up the appointment for one year, traveling to Europe to attend lectures by distinguished mathematicians. The Mathematics Genealogy Project lists his advisor as Michel Chasles, whose lectures on projective geometry he attended at the Sorbonne. Chasles' techniques had a significant impact on his subsequent research in mathematics, in particular on finding the equation of a circle tangent to three other circles.

However, Newton is best known for the study of the laws of meteors and of comets and their interrelation. He attempted to contribute to the theory advanced by Denison Olmsted of Yale in 1833 that meteors were a part of a mass of bodies moving round the sun in a fixed orbit. He began in 1860, with a description of a meteor observed on November 15, 1859. Using accounts of the path and timing of the meteor he used triangulation techniques to estimate its height and velocity. Starting in 1861, he supervised the work of the Connecticut Academy of Arts and Sciences to perform coordinated observations of meteors, providing standardized observational charts for tracking their paths. Results of this investigation, published in 1865, showed that the meteor showers in different months were occurring at different altitudes. He also examined the timing of meteor showers, showing that the drift in time over centuries could be explained by the precession of equinoxes (also known as axial precession, which he then used to put strong constraints on the orbits of the Leonid meteors.

Newton played an important role in American mathematics, as Yale became the first institution in the United States to grant doctoral degrees in mathematics in 1862. One of the most prominent graduates in mathematics during his tenure was E.H. Moore. He won the Smith gold medal from the National Academy of Sciences of which he was a founding member. In 1867, he was elected as a member to the American Philosophical Society in 1867. He was also elected an associate of the Royal Astronomical Society of London, served as president of the American Association for the Advancement of Science (1885), and was foreign member of the Royal Society of Edinburgh.

Many of his papers on meteors were published in the Memoirs of the National Academy, the Journal of Science, and the American Journal of Science.

== Family ==
In 1859 he married Miss Anna C. Stiles, a minister's daughter from New York with whom he had two daughters.

== See also ==
- Leonids
