= Ardsley Country Club =

Country club in Irvington, New York

Coordinates: 41.023906°N 73.855843°W

The Ardsley Country Club is a country club in the Ardsley-on-Hudson neighborhood of the village of Irvington, New York . It was founded in August 1895 to "cater to industrialists" such as Amzi Barber, J. P. Morgan, John D. and William Rockefeller, and Cornelius Vanderbilt II. It has been called "one of the grandest country clubs ever built" and "a symbol of the gilded age" where robber barons and the established rich of old New York mixed.

== History ==
=== Original development ===
In 1892, Amzi L. Barber bought the property known as "Ardsley Towers" in Irvington, New York. The property was built by Cyrus W. Field for his son, whose financial difficulties made a sale of the property necessary. Barber developed the 400-acre (160 ha) property into Ardsley Park and the Ardsley Country Club. Barber, a real-estate developer, had the idea that the homes he developed in Ardsley Park would be purchased by members of a neighboring country club. According to The New York Times, "this sense of symbiotic interchange between the residents of the surrounding community and the club helped create a cozy, if undeniably exclusionary, enclave."

The Ardsley Country Club was founded in August 1895 to cater to industrialists. Original members included Amzi Barber, William and John D. Rockefeller, J. P. Morgan, Jay Gould, and Cornelius Vanderbilt II. Ashbel P. Fitch was a member of the Ardsley Club upon his death in 1904. Founding members also included members of the Gould and Whitney families. According to author and club member Kate Buford, the club was "proof that two groups of society - the robber barons and old New York - would blend." As of March 1896, the club's board of governors had 21 members, including John D. Archbold, Amzi Barber, Walston H. Brown, William L. Bull, Frederick L. Eldridge, Samuel Goodman, Edwin Gould, E. G. Janeway, Cyrus Field Judson, William F. Judson, George H. Mairs, Major O. J. Smith, Philip Schuyler, General Samuel Thomas, John T. Terry, John T. Terry, Jr., Roderick Terry, Henry Villard, Charles C. Worthington, John Brisbain Walker, and Lucien Warner. Among other prominent members at the time were H. Walter Webb and Walter W. Law.

=== Founding features ===
After the club was incorporated in 1895, the Ardsley Casino Clubhouse was finished in the spring of 1896, designed by Goodhue Livingston of Trowbridge, Livingston & Colt, on a 500 acres (200 ha) plot overlooking the Hudson River. The clubhouse had sleeping rooms on the upper floors to accommodate forty or fifty members, with several baths and a large swimming tank at 25 feet by 15 feet. The main floor had a large clubroom, card and billiard rooms, and a large dining room. A private railroad station, now a Metro-North station, was built below the Casino, designed by McKim, Mead & White in the Tudor style, and express trains were available. The station is the only club-related building still extant; the site of the Casino, which was torn down in 1936, is now a cooperative residence known as Hudson House, designed by Shreve, Lamb and Harmon. Early on, some members would sail from Manhattan up the Hudson River and dock their yachts in the boat slips of the New York Yacht Club. Daily stagecoach service was available to the Hotel Brunswick on Fifth Avenue in Manhattan.

Around 200 trees were felled to allow a clear drive to the property, with many of the logs used to bank up the sides of a golf course. Architect Willie Dunn oversaw all aspects of the golf course's development. Founding attractions included stables, golf, polo, and tennis

According to author Frank E. Sanchis, Ardsley Country Club was "one of the grandest country clubs ever built." It had a pool for swimming, and members of both genders could play the new sports of tennis and golf. According to Buford, the club was set apart from other smaller clubs by "a massive, hotel-like clubhouse and spectacular golf course. It was a symbol of the gilded age." Contemporary clubs included the Knollwood Country Club in Elmsford, New York, founded a year before Ardsley, and the Bonnie Briar Country Club in Larchmont, New York.

In 1898, the club held the opening of the Women's National Golf Championship Tournament. By noon on October 11, around 1,000 persons were present at the match.

=== Modern years ===
The club became an increasingly family club in the 1930s. Between 1935 and 1965, many of the club's members and their families lived in the nearby Ardsley Park area.

In 1935, many of the old furnishings were sold for low prices at auction. The original clubhouse and grounds, once assessed at $850,000, was at the time being foreclosed on for a mortgage of $350,000, with the expectation that the clubhouse would be razed and the property used for country homes; although in fact the Hudson House co-op was built there.

By June 1966, it had 60 members under president Edwin L. Sibert Jr. In 1966, three new curling rinks were planned for the club. As of 1995, membership of the club played tennis and golf, swam, and attended social events on the same site. It had 450 member families, under president Harvey Appelle.
