= Gustave J. Stoeckel =

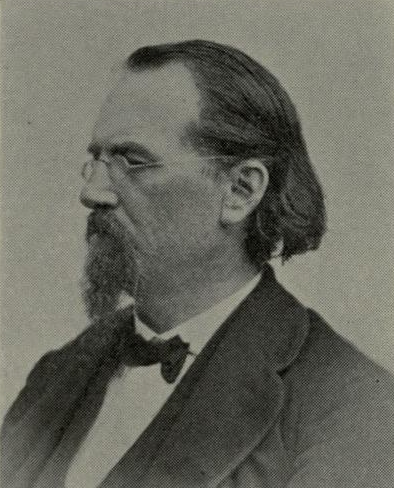

Gustave Jakob Stoeckel (November 9, 1819 – May 14, 1907) was a longtime music instructor and college organist at Yale University in New Haven, Connecticut.

== Biography ==
Born in Maikammer, Bavarian Palatinate, Stoeckel graduated from the seminary in Kaiserslautern in 1838, and then pursued a post-graduate course in musical composition under Joseph Krebs. He was a teacher and organist until 1847, when he emigrated to the United States. He joined Yale University in 1849 when he became a music teacher there, and was appointed organist of Yale College Chapel. Yale gave him the degree of Mus.D. in 1864.

He pioneered Yale's program in music and was one of its first faculty. In 1868, he became the first faculty director of the Yale Glee Club, Yale's oldest singing group, now a professionally led 80-voice choir of international fame. He held the position of organist at Yale's chapel for over 30 years, beginning in 1860 until his resignation in May 1894. He made his last appearance as a professor of music performing preludes and postludes for the graduating class at the commencement exercises held in Battell Chapel on Sunday, June 24, 1894.

== Writings ==
Stoeckel compiled a hymnal with the title Sacred Music, first published in New York in 1868. He published College Hymn-Book for male voices in 1886. Besides compositions for the piano, songs, and overtures and symphonies for orchestra, he was also the author of several unpublished operas: "Lichtenstein," "Mahomet," "Miles Standish," and "Miskodeeda."

== Legacy ==
Yale University named a former student club building in honor of Gustave Stoeckel in 1954 when the School of Music moved in. Renovated in 2009, it is now the home of the Department of Music of Yale College. The building, at the corner of College and Wall Streets, was designed by Grosvenor Atterbury in the Venetian Gothic style.

Battell Chapel is named for Joseph Battell (1774–1841), and was built with funds donated by his son Joseph Battell (1806–1874) and others of his family, whose 1854 gift enabled the university to begin offering music education.
