= John T. Terry =

American merchant and banker

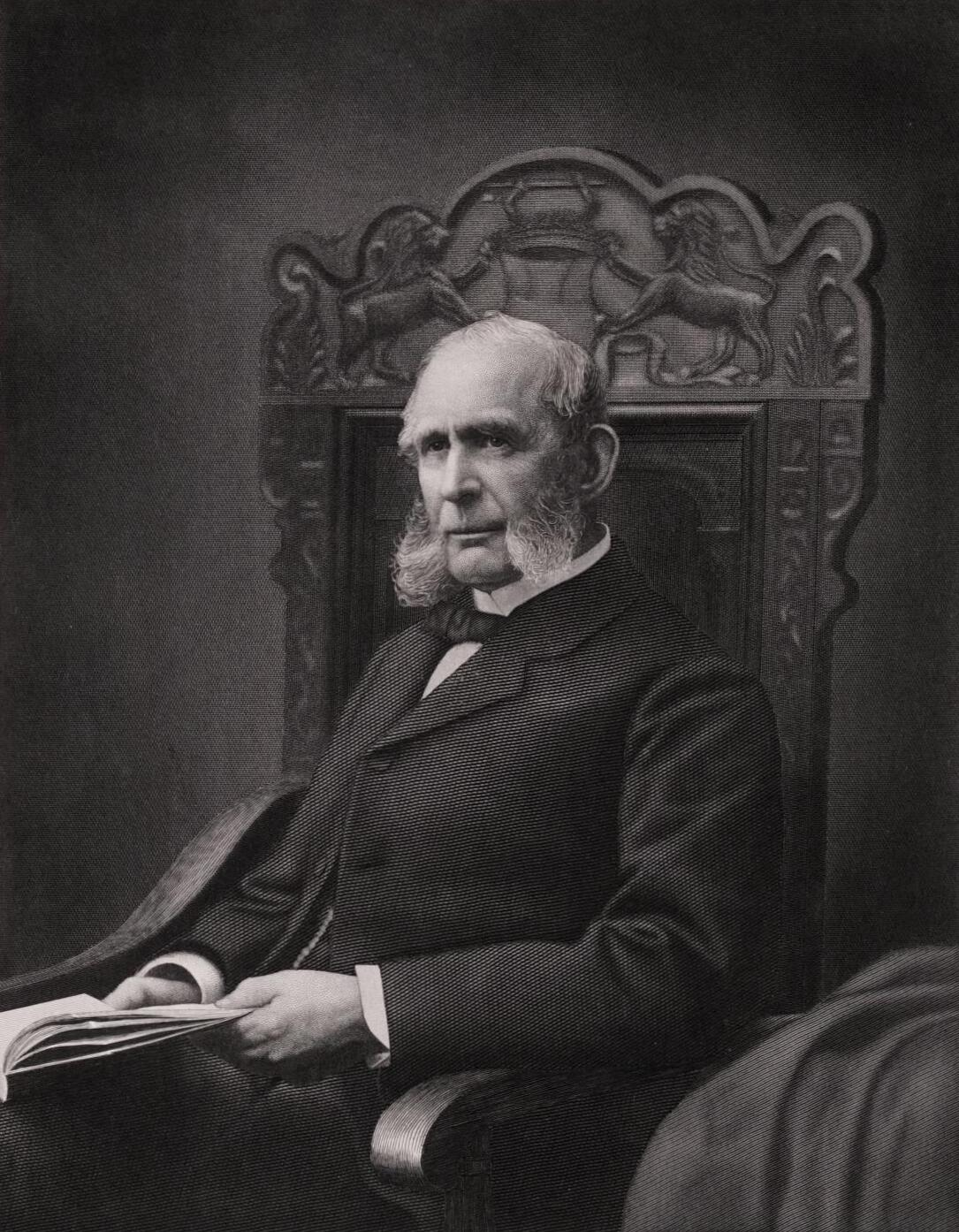
Terry, as found in the Illustrated American biography; containing memoirs, and engravings and etchings of representative Americans. vol. 4, 1895

John Taylor Terry (September 9, 1822 – May 3, 1913) was an American merchant and banker.

== Early life ==
Terry was born on September 9, 1822, in Hartford, Connecticut. He was a son of Harriet (née Taylor) Terry (1794–1841) and Roderick Terry (1788–1849), a member of the City Council and Connecticut state legislature who was president of The Exchange Bank in Hartford. After his mother's death in 1841, his father married Lucy Coit (née Ripley) Birge, daughter of Dwight Ripley and widow of Backus W. Birge.

His maternal grandparents were the Rev. John Taylor and Elizabeth (née Terry) Taylor. His paternal grandparents were Eliphalet Terry and Mary (née Hall) Terry. Terry traced his lineage to Gov. William Bradford of Mayflower and Plymouth Colony fame as well as Continental Army Col. Nathaniel Terry, several Connecticut governors, and Civil War Maj.-Gen. Alfred H. Terry. His uncle, Eliphalet Terry, was president of The Hartford Fire Insurance Company.

== Career ==
In 1841, Terry moved to New York to clerk for Edwin Denison Morgan (future New York governor, U.S. Senator and Major General) at his import house, E.D. Morgan & Company (which had been organized by Morgan in 1843 with his cousin George D. Morgan and Frederick Avery). After Avery left the firm in 1844, Terry became the third partner. After Morgan's death in 1883, Terry assumed control of the firm.

Terry, George Jay Gould, and the estate of Russell Sage controlled the board and management of Western Union Telegraph Company until 1909 when they all sold their stock to American Telephone & Telegraph Company which assumed control of Western Union.

== Personal life ==
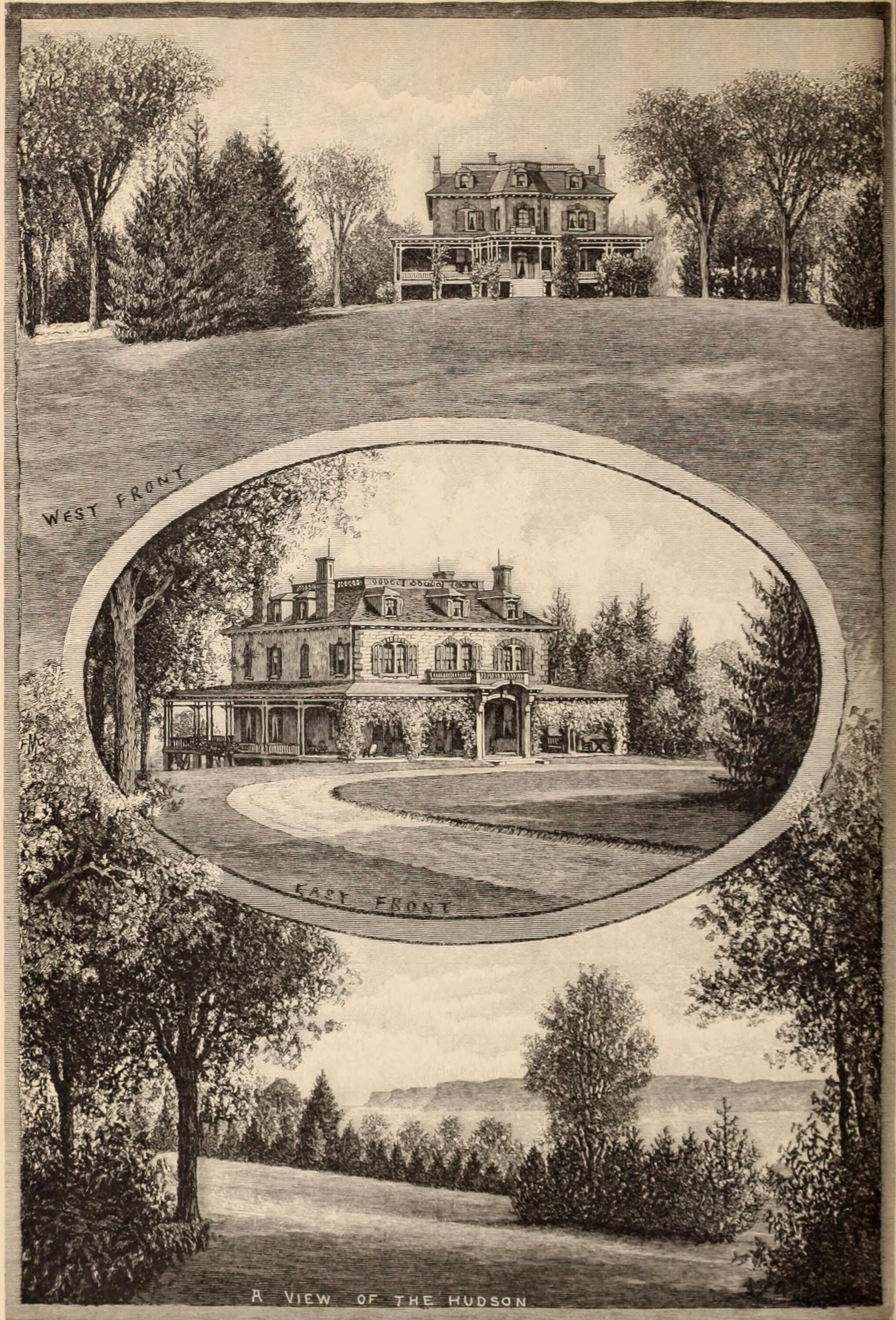
Pinkstone, Terry's estate in Tarrytown, New York

In 1846, Terry was married to Elizabeth Roe Peet (1826–1899), a daughter of Frederick Tomlinson Peet and Elizabeth Roe (née Lockwood) Peet. Together, they were the parents of seven children, including:

- Frederick Peet Terry (1847–1874), a Yale graduate and merchant who married Ellen Mills Battell, a daughter of Robbins Battell. After his death, she married Carl Stoeckel.
- Roderick Terry (1849–1933), a minister who married Linda Marquand, a daughter of Henry Gurdon Marquand, in 1875.
- Henriette Taylor Terry (1851–1857), who died young.
- Elizabeth Lockwood Terry (1855–1855), who died in infancy.
- John Taylor Terry Jr. (1857–1942), who married Bertha Halsted, sister of Dr. William Stewart Halsted.

In June 1853, he was a founder of the Irvington Presbyterian Church, serving as an officer of the church for the rest of his life. Terry was also a founder of the Ardsley Country Club in 1895.

Terry died on May 3, 1913, and was buried at Sleepy Hollow Cemetery.

=== Pinkstone estate ===
In 1853, 31-year-old Terry acquired a 35-acre estate along the Hudson River in Tarrytown, New York, from the Requa family (next door to Lyndhurst, the estate of New York City mayor William Paulding Jr., then merchant George Merritt, and railroad tycoon Jay Gould). In 1858 he began construction of a pink granite mansion on his estate which he called "Pinkstone". The estate remained in his family until his death in 1913 when it was sold to Rev. Alfred Duane Pell before being acquired by Harold Mayer Lehman of Lehman Brothers (who added a brick exterior in the Georgian Colonial style and renamed the house "Willow Pond"). (Note: In the mid-1950s the neighboring Lehman family estates of Mill Brook and Elm Brook were acquired by the General Foods, demolishing the houses to build a corporate campus on the properties. Willow Pond was acquired in 1975 and General Foods demolished the mansion to "make way for the creation of a 60-space parking lot", however, the parking area was never constructed. Montefiore Health System bought the property from General Foods successor Kraft Foods in 2013 for $33 million.)
