= Francis Allyn Olmsted =

American writer

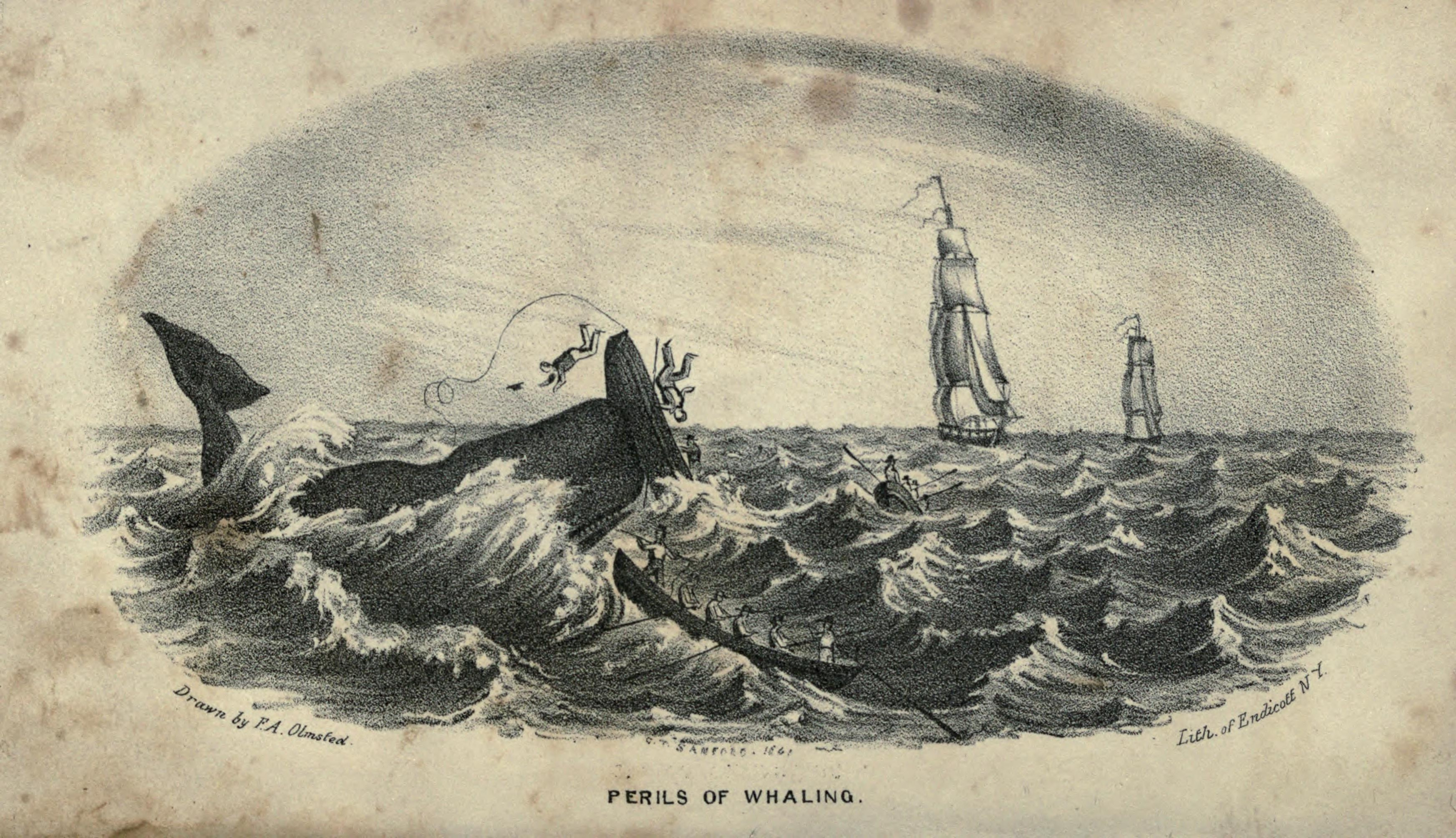
Perils of Whaling, drawing by Francis Allyn Olmsted, 1841.

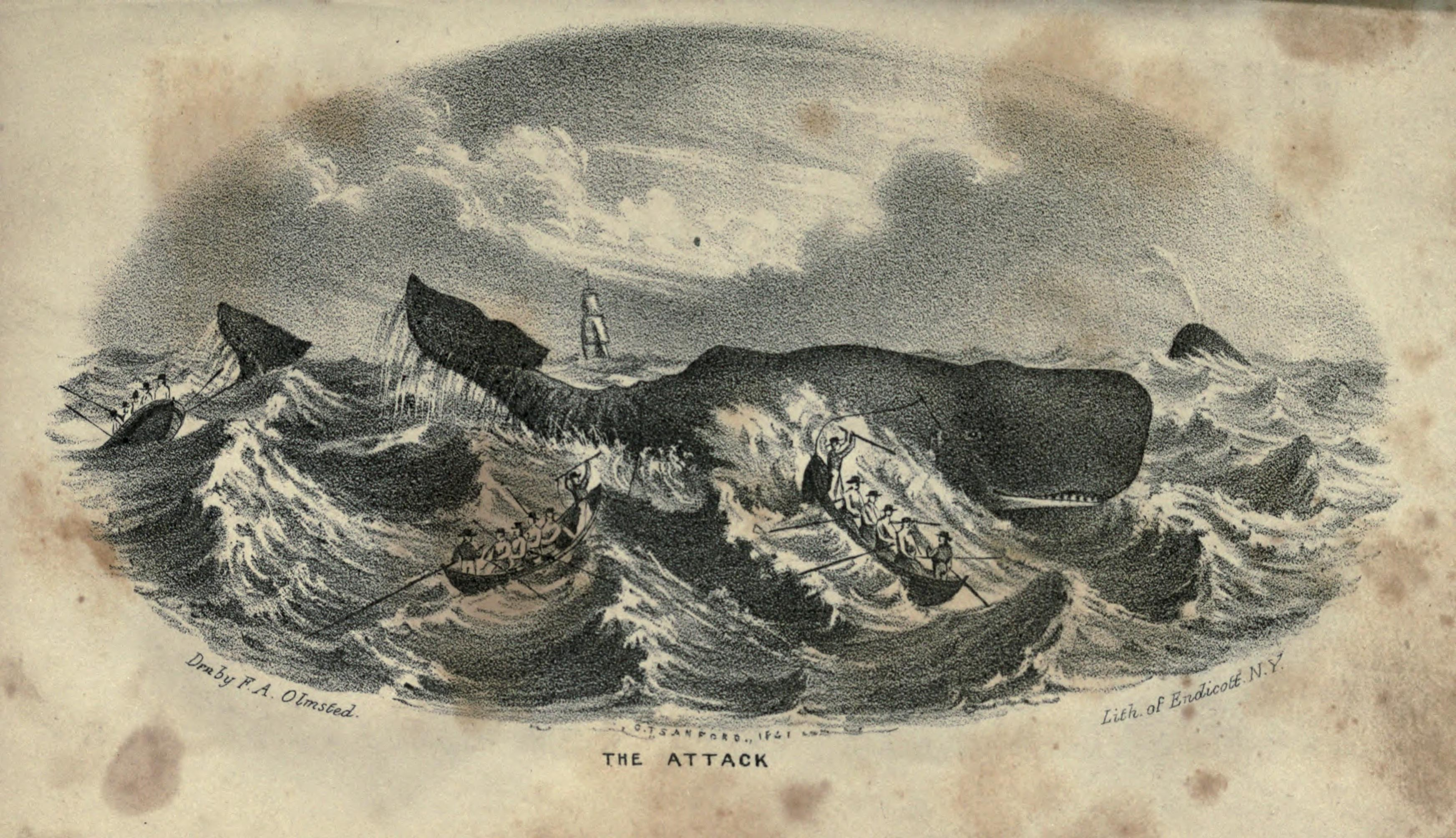
The Attack, drawing by Francis Allyn Olmsted, 1841.

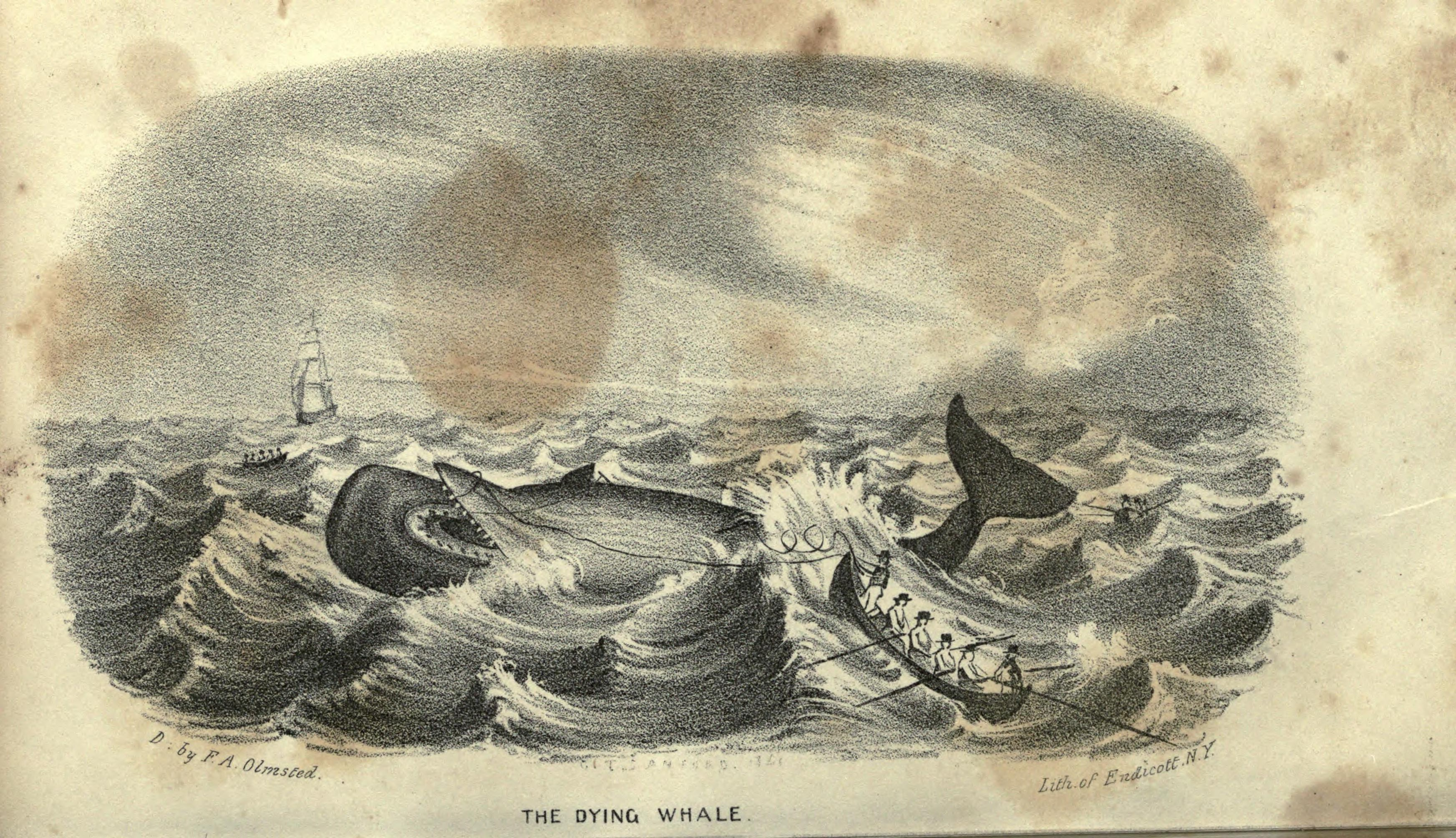
The Dying Whale, drawing by Francis Allyn Olmsted, 1841.

Francis Allyn Olmsted (14 July 1819, in Chapel Hill, North Carolina – 19 July 1844, in New Haven, Connecticut) was an American writer.

== Biography ==
He was a son of physicist Denison Olmsted. He graduated from Yale in 1839. He made a sea voyage to the Kingdom of Hawai'i for his health, on the barque North America in 1839 and 1840, and after his return he graduated from the medical department of Yale in 1844.

He wrote Incidents of a Whaling Voyage, published in 1841 at New York City by D. Appleton and Co., the publishers of Appletons' Cyclopædia of American Biography. The voyage was from New London, Connecticut and took in the Azores, Cape Horn, Hawaii, Tahiti, before returning to Sandy Hook.

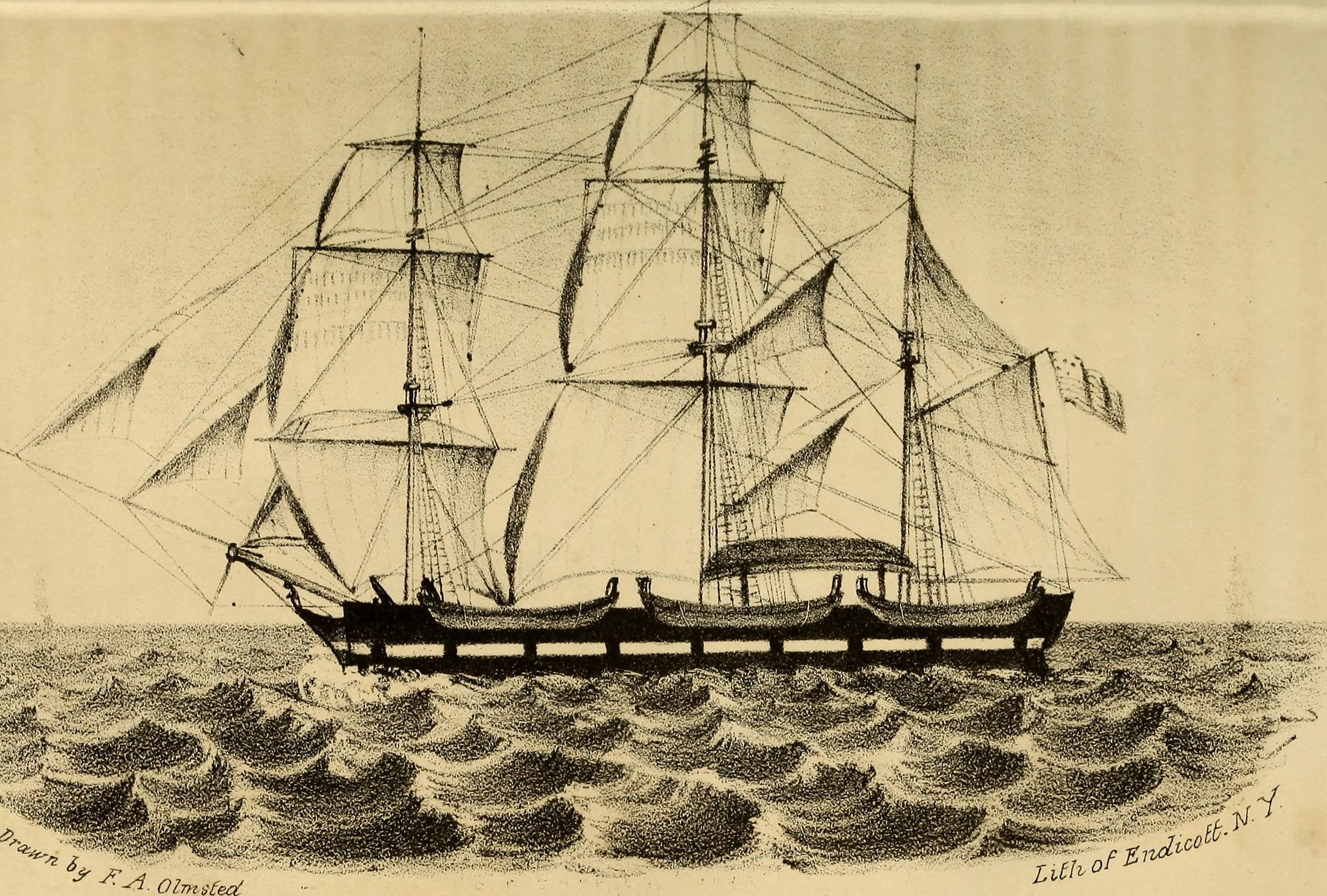
North America a bargue (386 tons) built by Stephen Girard (circa 1816).
