= Russell Sturgis =

American art critic (1836–1909)

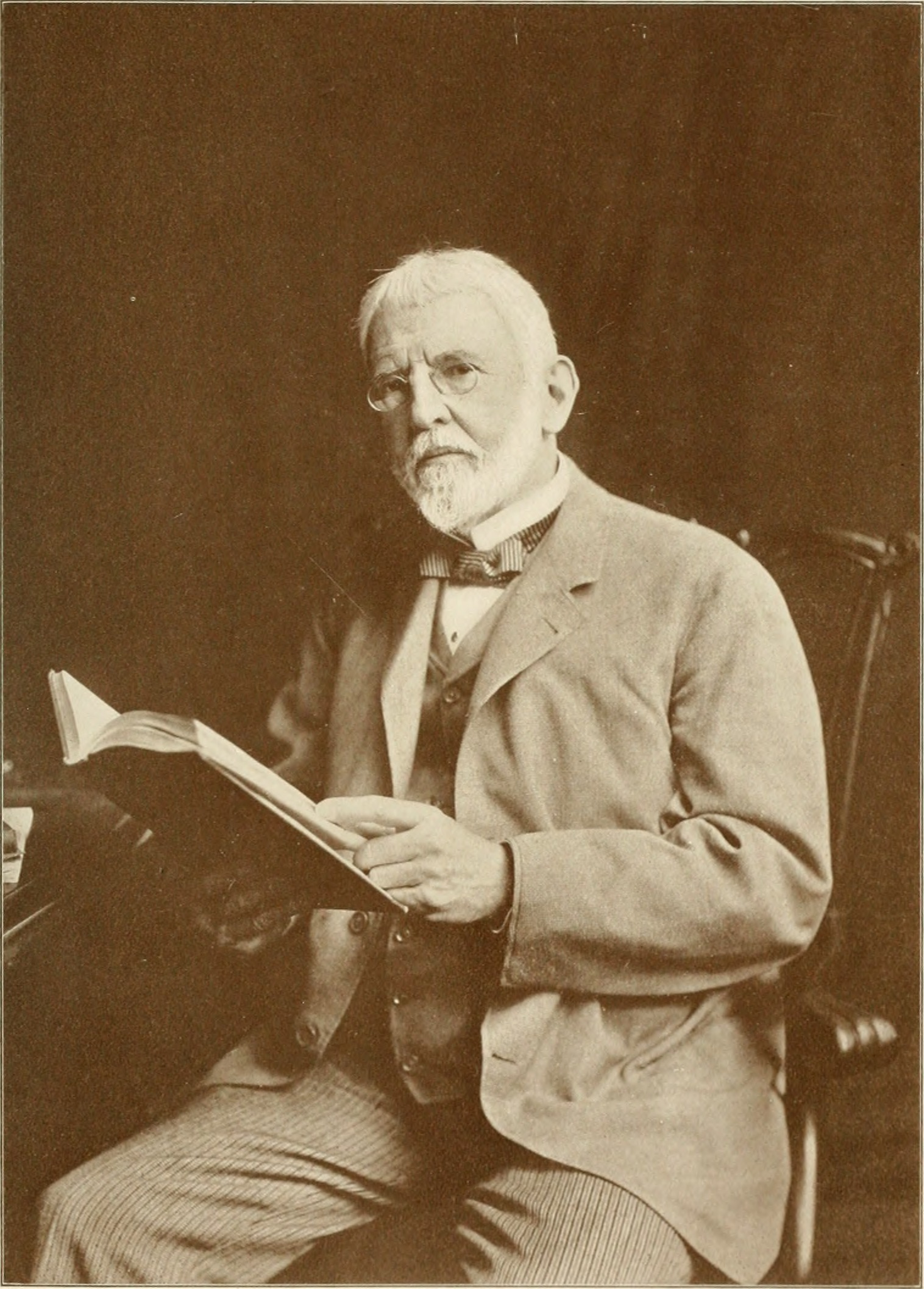
Russell Sturgis

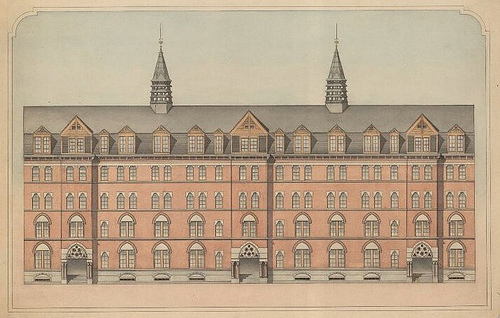
Architectural drawings for Farnam Hall, Yale College, by Russell Sturgis, ca. 1868

Russell Sturgis (/ˈstɜːrdʒɪs/; October 16, 1836 – February 11, 1909) was an American architect and art critic of the 19th and early 20th centuries. He was one of the founders of the Metropolitan Museum of Art in 1870.

Sturgis was born in Baltimore County, Maryland. His parents were Russell Sturgis, a New York shipping merchant living temporarily in Baltimore, and Margaret Dawes (Appleton) Sturgis. His paternal grandparents were Thomas Sturgis (1755-1821), who served as a private in Captain Micah Hamlin's Company, of the Colonel Simeon Cary's Regiment (1776), and Elizabeth (Jackson) Sturgis (1768-1844). Sturgis is the grandnephew of the merchant Russell Sturgis (1750-1826) (the younger brother of his paternal grandfather) and is, therefore, a second cousin to the merchant and banker Russell Sturgis (1805–1887).

Educated in the public schools of New York City, Sturgis was graduated from the Free Academy in New York (now the College of the City of New York) in 1856, and later studied architecture under Leopold Eidlitz. For about a year and a half he also studied in Munich. In 1862 he returned to the United States. He was associated with Peter Bonnett Wight from 1863 to 1868 and then practiced alone until 1880.

in 1863 Sturgis together with the painter John William Hill, art critic Clarence Cook, and geologist and art critic Clarence King helped to found the Society for the Advancement of Truth in Art which published a journal The New Path. The articles written by Sturgis provided an early glimpse of his critical interest in art and architecture, made amply clear in his later writings.

On May 26, 1864, he married Sarah Maria Barney, daughter of Danford N. Barney of New York City. Her father served as president of Wells Fargo & Company from 1853 to 1866. Russell and Sarah Sturgis were the parents of four sons and three daughters, of whom one son died in infancy.

== Career as architect ==
Between 1865 and 1880 he designed Battell Chapel and Lawrance, Farnam and Durfee Halls at Yale; the Homeopathic Medical College and Flower Hospital, New York City; the Farmers' and Mechanics' Bank of Albany; and churches, commercial buildings, and residences in New York City, Albany, Aurora, Tarrytown and Watertown, New York; New Haven, Farmington and Litchfield, Connecticut; Louisville, Kentucky; and Minneapolis, Minnesota.

Upon the reorganization of the American Institute of Architects in 1868, Sturgis was elected secretary, while Richard Upjohn was president and R.G. Hatfield treasurer. Also in 1868, Sturgis published his Manual of the Jarves Collection of Early American Pictures in the Yale School of Fine Arts. When the Metropolitan Museum of Art was established in 1870, Sturgis was a trustee and a member of the executive committee until 1876, also serving as corresponding secretary from 1870 to 1873. He designed the First Baptist Church at Tarrytown, New York about 1875.

During the Exposition Universelle of 1878, Sturgis spent some months in France, and upon his return accepted the chair of architecture and the arts of design at the College of the City of New York. He was the co-author, with Charles Eliot Norton, of a Catalogue of Ancient and Modern Engravings, Woodcuts and Illustrated Books, Parts of the Collections of C.E. Norton and R. Sturgis (1879). On account of ill health he left his professorship and retired from business in 1880 and went to Europe. Residing chiefly in Paris and Florence, he remained abroad until 1884. For a short time after his return he was secretary of the New York Municipal Civil Service Board, but resigned out of dislike for the political complications involved in the position.

He trained architect Arthur Bates Jennings.

On December 30, 1886, Sturgis and his eldest son, Appleton, represented the family at the funeral of his wife's uncle, Ashbel H. Barney, retired president (1869–70) of Wells Fargo & Company.

== Author and critic ==
Sturgis was a fellow of the American Institute of Architects and of the National Academy of Design; an honorary fellow of the Brooklyn Institute of Arts and Sciences; a fellow in perpetuity of the Metropolitan Museum of Art; life member of the American Numismatic and Archaeological Society; honorary member of the National Society of Mural Painters; and a member of the Architectural League of New York (president in 1889-93), the Grolier Club, the Municipal Art Society, Archaeological Institute of America, National Sculpture Society, the Japan Society, the Fine Arts Federation of New York (first president, 1895–97); member of the University, Century and Players clubs of New York City; and a member of the Society for the Promotion of Hellenic Studies in London.

He lectured on art at Columbia University, the Metropolitan Museum of Art in New York; the Peabody Institute of Baltimore and the Art Institute of Chicago; his Scammon Lectures of 1904-05 in Chicago were published under the title The Interdependence of the Arts of Design (1905). Sturgis received the honorary degrees of MA from Yale in 1870 and PhD from the College of the City of New York in 1893. A disciple of John Ruskin, Sturgis intensely disliked the trend toward neoclassic eclecticism at the end of the 19th century and hailed Louis H. Sullivan's work as the most significant that was being done in America.

A leading authority on the history of architecture and art, Sturgis was editor for decorative art and medieval archaeology of the Century Dictionary, editor of architecture and fine art for Johnson's Universal Cyclopaedia (1893–95); and compiler (for the American Library Association) of the Annotated Bibliography of Fine Art (1897). In January 1897 he became editor of The Field of Art, a department of Scribner's Magazine, which he continued until his death.

He is best known as a writer on art and architecture, making many contributions to dictionaries, encyclopedias and periodicals. He was editor-in-chief of A Dictionary of Architecture and Building (3 vols, 1901–1902). Sturgis edited and revised the English version of Wilhelm Luebke's Outlines of the History of Art (2 vols, 1904), and was editor on fine arts for the Encyclopedia Americana (1904–05). He wrote:

- European Architecture: A Historical Study (1896).
- The Etchings of Piranesi (1900).
- How to Judge Architecture (1903).
- The Appreciation of Sculpture (1904).
- The Appreciation of Pictures (1905).
- A Study of the Artist's Way of Working in the Various Handicrafts and Arts of Design (2 vols, 1905).
- The Interdependence of the Arts of Design (1905).
- Ruskin on Architecture (1906).
- History of Architecture (4 vols., 1906–1915; Vols. III and IV were completed by A.L. Frothingham, Jr.).
  - Volume I. Antiquity (1906).
  - Volume II. Romanesque and Oriental (1909).
  - Volume III. Gothic in Italy, France, and Northern Europe (1915)
  - Volume IV. Gothic in Great Britain — Renaissance — Modern Architecture (1915)

During his last years he was nearly blind. He died on February 11, 1909, at his long-time home, 307 East 17th Street, in New York City. Sarah Sturgis died there on May 1, 1910.

== Selected buildings ==
- Joseph H. Scranton house (1867–71), Scranton, Pennsylvania.
- Farnham Hall (1868–70), Yale University, New Haven, Connecticut.
- Dean Sage house (1869), 839 St. Mark's Avenue, Brooklyn, New York.
- Durfee Hall (1870–71), Yale University, New Haven, Connecticut.
- Theodore Roosevelt, Sr. house (1872–73, demolished), 6 West 57th Street, New York City. Interiors were designed by Frank Furness and executed by Daniel Pabst.
- Mechanics' and Farmers' Bank (1874–75), State & James Streets, Albany, New York.
- Battell Chapel (1874–76), Yale University, New Haven, Connecticut.
- First Baptist Church (1875–81), Tarrytown, New York.
- Lawrance Hall (1885–86), Yale University, New Haven, Connecticut.
- Homeopathic Medical College and Flower Free Surgical Hospital (1888–89), York Avenue & 63rd Street, New York City.
- Rev. Cannon Douglas house (c. 1899), Tuxedo Park, New York.
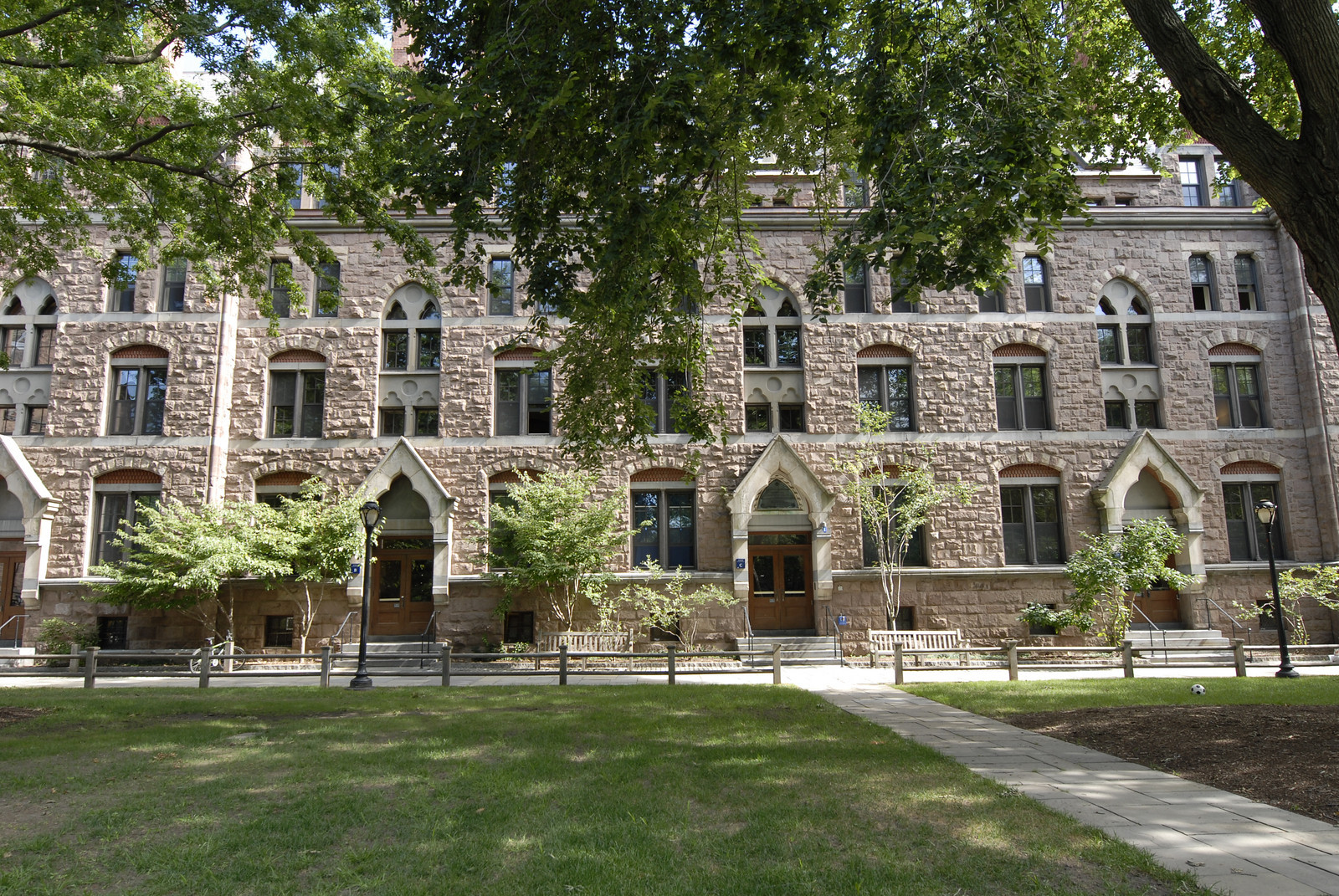
Durfee Hall (1871), Yale University, New Haven, Connecticut.

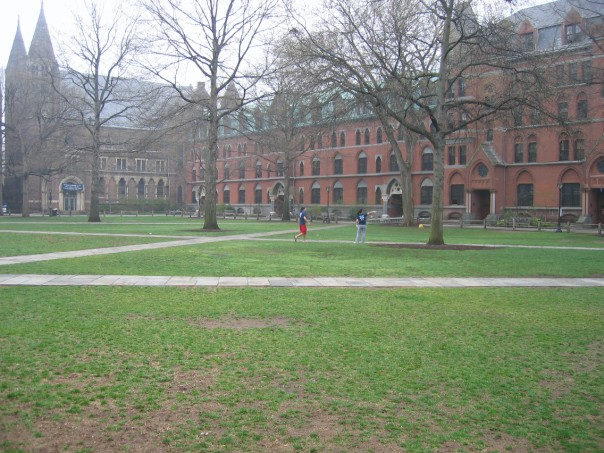
Battell Chapel (1874–76), Farnham Hall (1868-70), and Lawrance Hall (1886), Yale University, New Haven, Connecticut.

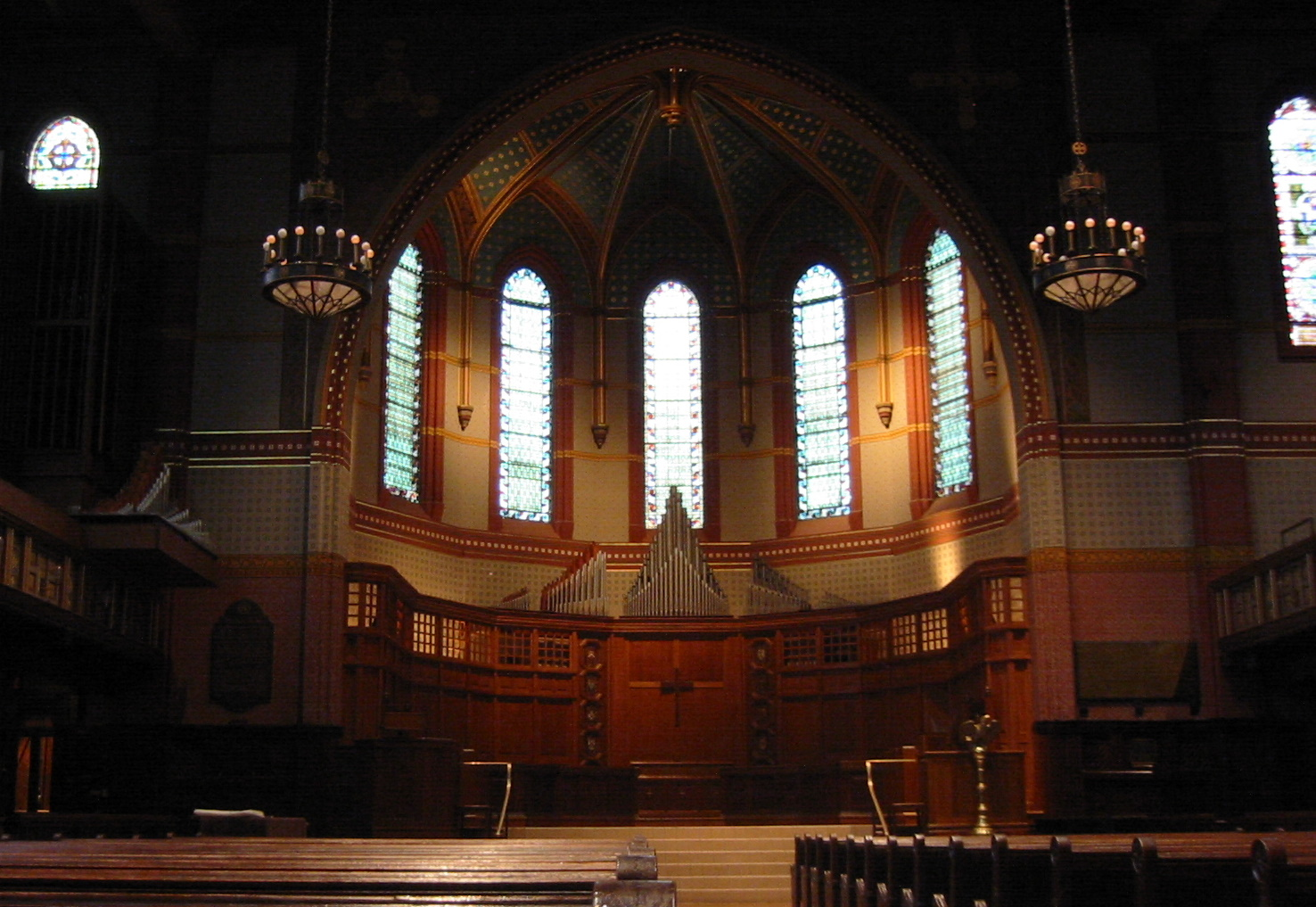
Battell Chapel (1874–76), Yale University, New Haven, Connecticut.

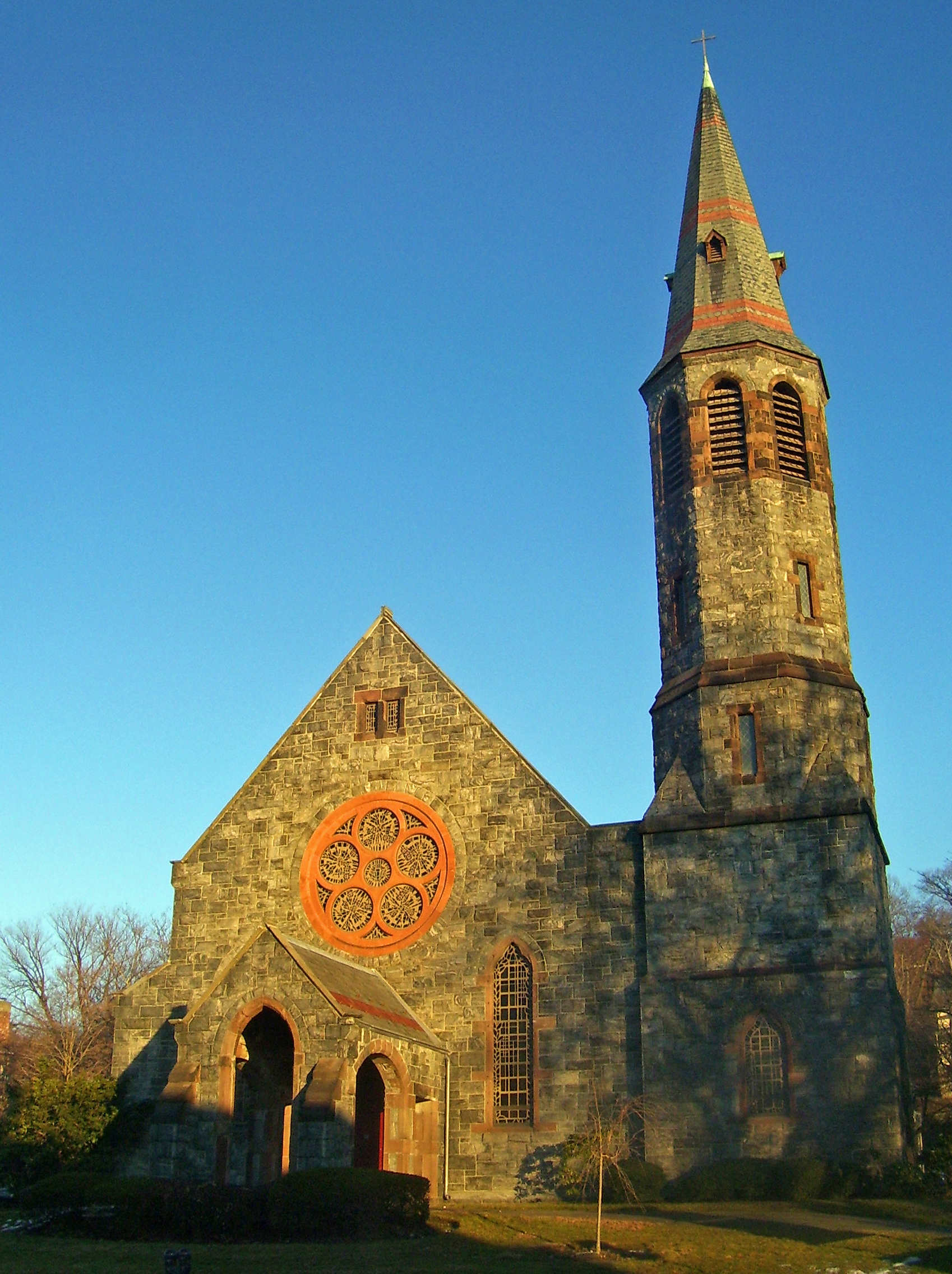
First Baptist Church (1875–81), Tarrytown, New York.
