= Anthony Dumond Stanley =

American mathematician (1810–1853)

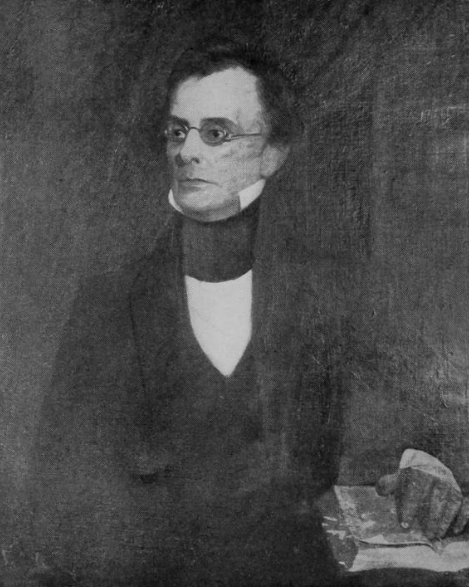
Portrait of Anthony Dumond Stanley (1810–1853)

Anthony Dumond Stanley (April 2, 1810, East Hartford, Connecticut - March 16, 1853, East Hartford, Connecticut) was a mathematician.

== Early life and education ==
Born April 2, 1810 in East Hartford, Connecticut, his parents were Martin and Catharine (née Van Garsbeck) Stanley. He studied at Hartford Grammar School under Edward Beecher and William M. Holland.

He graduated with a bachelor's degree from Yale University in 1830. His first employment was to return to Hartford Grammar School as an instructor for two years.

== Teaching at Yale ==
He was elected tutor at Yale College in 1832. He received a master's degree in 1833. In 1836 the chair in mathematics held by Denison Olmstead was divided. Olmstead was appointed professor of natural philosophy and astronomy and Stanley was promoted to professor of mathematics.

After his appointment and before taking up the post, Stanley spent the next two years in Europe.

He held the chair in mathematics until his death from tuberculosis in 1853, but was earlier in 1851 and 1852 absent from the university as he traveled abroad, including to Egypt in search of relief from his illness. After the chair was offered to William Chauvenet, who declined it, Hubert A. Newton, who had been tutor and effectively head of mathematics during Stanley's absence, was appointed to succeed him in 1855.

He published an Elementary Treatise of Spherical Geometry and Trigonometry (New Haven, 1848), and Tables of Logarithms of Numbers, and of Logarithmic Sines, Tangents, and Secants to Seven Places of Decimals, together with Other Tables (1849). He also edited an edition of Day's Algebra, assisted in the revision of Webster's Quarto Dictionary (1847), and left several unfinished works in manuscript.

He is commemorated with a window in Yale's Battell Chapel.

== Selected Works ==
- ——— (1847). Tables of logarithms of numbers and of logarithmic sines, tangents and secants to seven places of decimals ... New Haven: Durrie and Peck.
- ——— (1854). An Elementary Treatise of Spherical Geometry and Trigonometry (Revised ed.). New Haven: Durrie and Peck.
- Day, Jeremiah (1857). ——— (ed.). An Introduction to Algebra: Being the First Part of A Course of Mathematics ... New Haven: H. C. Peck and T. Bliss.

== Sources ==
.
