= Joseph Battell (1806–1874) =

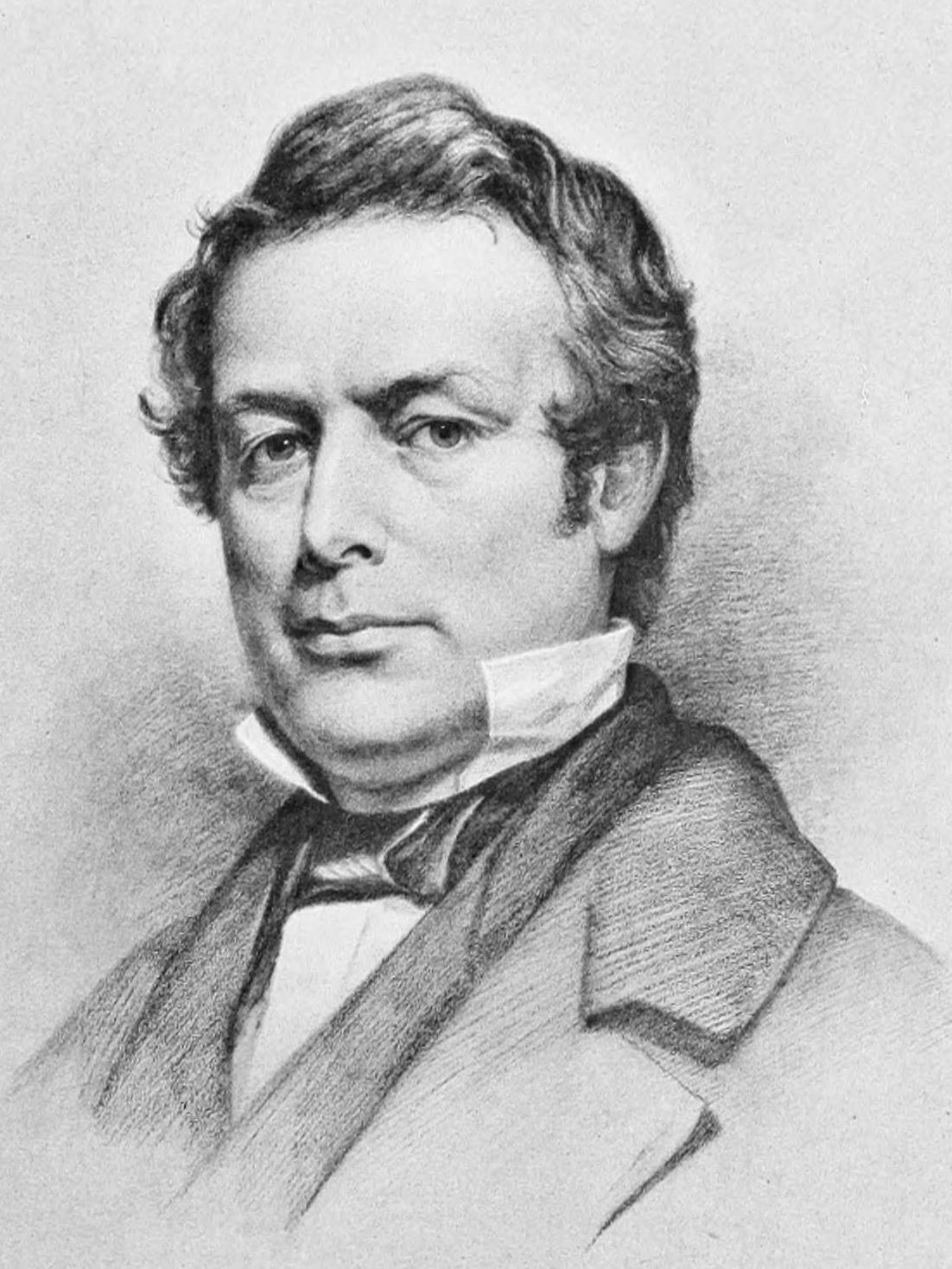
- Sketch of Joseph Battell by J. N. Niemeyer
- Born: April 17, 1806; Norfolk, Connecticut
- Died: July 8, 1874 (aged 68); Brooklyn, New York
- Occupations: Merchant and philanthropist
- Known for: Battell Chapel
- Relatives: Ellen Battell Stoeckel, granddaughter

Joseph Battell (April 17, 1806 – July 8, 1874) was a businessman and benefactor of Yale University.

Battell was born to Joseph Battell (1774–1841) and Sarah Robbins. He graduated from Middlebury College in 1824 before moving to New York City.

Battell's sister, Irene Battell, married Yale professor William Augustus Larned. Battell was an enthusiast of sacred music and established a fund at Yale for it in 1854. This gift was the first towards an eventual School of Music, officially founded in 1890. He later gave $30,000 to fund the construction of Battell Chapel, completed in 1876, and willed Yale an additional $50,000 to ensure its completion. Battell died in Brooklyn, New York on July 8, 1874.
