= William Augustus Larned (professor) =

American educator

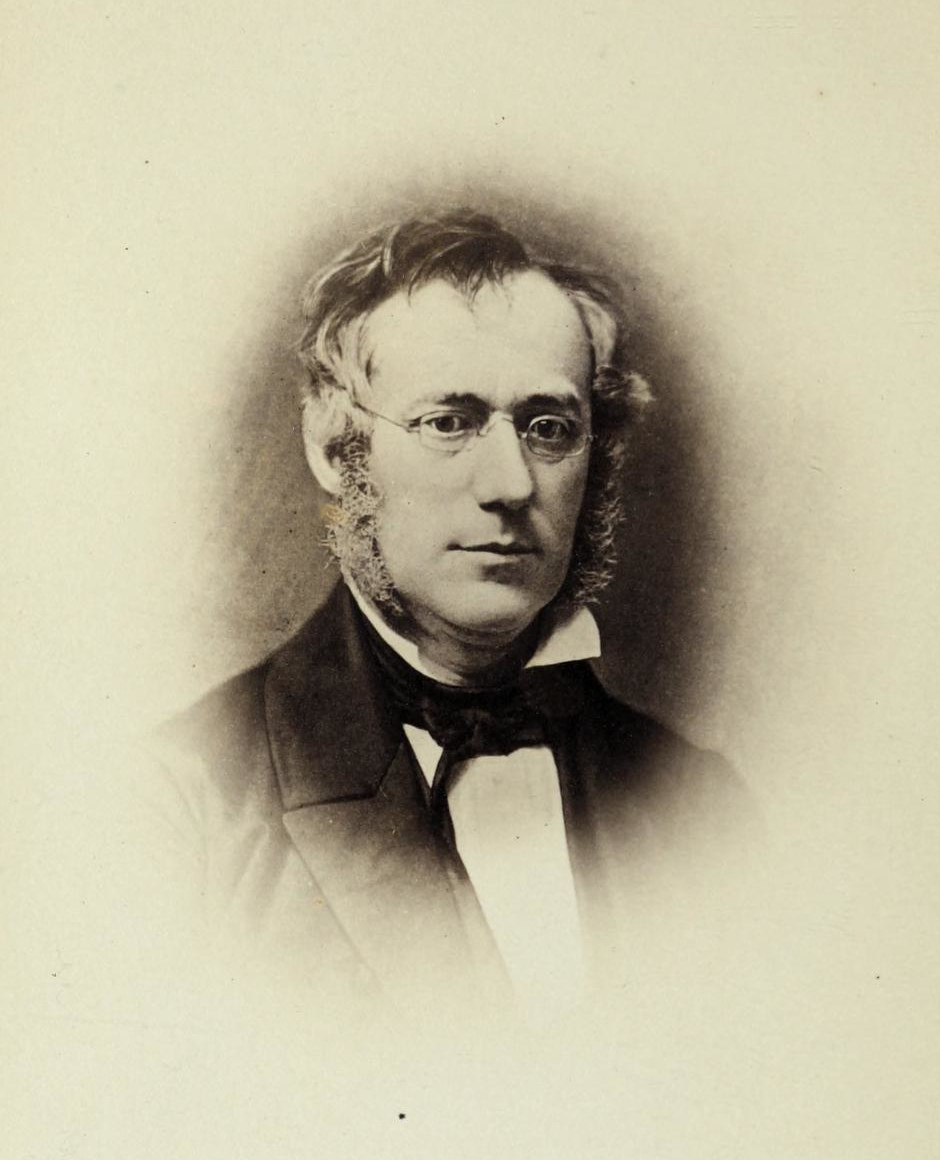
William Augustus Larned

William Augustus Larned (June 23, 1806 – February 3, 1862) was an American minister and professor at Yale College.

He was son of George Larned and grandson of Gen. Daniel Larned, of Thompson, Connecticut, and was born in that town on June 23, 1806. He graduated from Yale College in 1826. Two years after graduating he spent in teaching at Salisbury, North Carolina. Then from 1828 to 1831 he was a tutor in Yale College. At the close of this period a change in his religious convictions led him to abandon the course of law studies on which he had entered, and devote himself to theology under the guidance of Rev. Dr. Taylor, in the seminary at New Haven.

In the spring of 1834 he was ordained Pastor of the Congregational church in Millbury, Massachusetts. He remained there till October of the next year, when the loss of health compelled him to resign. He then accepted proposals from Rev. Dr. Nathan S. S. Beman and Rev. Mr. Edward Norris Kirk to engage with them in the instruction of a theological school at Troy, New York, the Troy and Albany School of Theology. He was there occupied in teaching Hebrew and Greek and in preaching, till the institution was crippled by the financial disasters of 1837.

In 1839, on the transfer of Prof. Goodrich to the Yale Theological Department, Mr. Larned was elected Professor of Rhetoric and English Literature in Yale College, and for 22 years he discharged the duties of this office with assiduity and success.

From its commencement in 1843, he was one of the most constant contributors to The New Englander, about thirty articles on political, literary, and philosophical topics having been published by him in that magazine. In 1854 and 1855, he acted as its editor. He printed, but did not publish, an exposition of the grammatical principles of Becker in The Analysis of the Sentence, (New Haven, 12mo. pp. 100). In the later years of his life he was much occupied in preparing an edition of the Oration of Demosthenes on the Crown, with philological and rhetorical notes. (2d Ed. revised3 New Haven, 1858, 8vo.) Although he made this volume a text-book in his own classes, he refrained, with characteristic diffidence, from offering it to the public.

His increasingly useful career was suddenly terminated by a stroke of apoplexy as he was returning home, in a snow storm, from a walk on which his last known act was an example of the unselfish Christian kindness which had adorned his life. He died in New Haven, Connecticut, February 3, 1862, aged 55.

He was married in 1843 to Irene, daughter of Joseph Battell, of Norfolk, Connecticut.

A discourse by President Woolsey, commemorative of Mr. Larned, has been printed, (New Haven, 8vo) and an article from the same pen appeared in The New Englander for April, 1862.
