= Durfee Hall =

Yale University dormitory

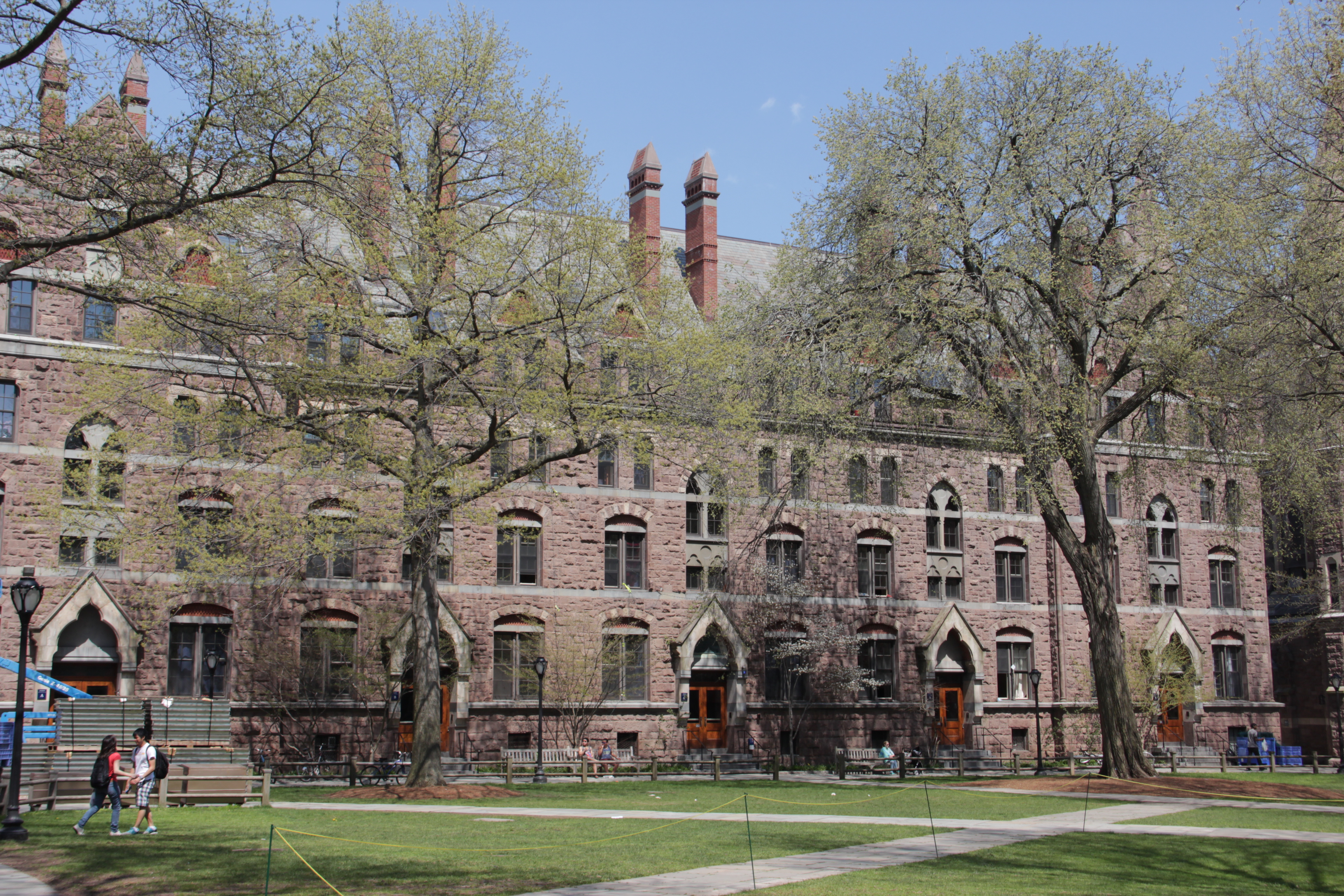
- Durfee Hall from the southwest
- Interactive map of the Durfee Hall area

General information
- Architectural style: High Victorian Gothic
- Location: New Haven, Connecticut, United States
- Coordinates: 41°18′35″N 72°55′41″W
- Completed: 1871
- Renovated: 1977
- Cost: $130,000
- Client: Yale University

Technical details
- Floor count: 5
- Floor area: 43,805

Design and construction
- Architect: Russell Sturgis, Jr.

Renovating team
- Architect: Edward Larrabee Barnes

Other information
- Number of rooms: 40

Durfee Hall is a freshman residential dormitory on the Old Campus of Yale University. Built in 1871, it is the second oldest residential building at Yale, only after Farnam Hall. Currently, the building is used to house first-year students of Saybrook College, who stay there for the duration of their freshman year before moving into Saybrook College proper.

== History ==
Durfee Hall was completed in 1871 under the direction of Russell Sturgis, Jr. (M.A., Honorary, Yale University, 1872) and received its name from the generous Yale benefactor Bradford M. C. Durfee, Esq., of Fall River, Massachusetts. It was the second of a set of three buildings Sturgis designed that include Farnam Hall and Battell Chapel, and was originally described simply as "large and costly." However, it was quickly recognized as the defining piece of architecture on Yale's campus, and by the late 19th century, it was referred to by The New York Times as "the centre of wealth at Yale" and as "one of the finest college dormitories in the United States."

== Design and layout ==
Durfee Hall is composed of communal suites designed to house between six and nine students each. Each suite contains a central common room from which bedrooms, hallways, and private bathrooms branch off. 80% of the rooms in Durfee are singles—the highest percentage of singles in any freshman housing. The suites are positioned around five stairwells open to the Old Campus yard, three of which have access to the fifth floor. The suites are designed with a unique walk-through layout that allows residents to pass through unlocked suites from one end of the building to another without descending the stairwell. Most suites are also positioned between two of the stairwells, and have access to both.

The exterior of Durfee is covered in a combination of sandstone and bluestone, and is accentuated with gables, ornate turrets, and large brick chimneys. Upon its completion, it was considered a "high point in Victorian Gothic Style architecture," and critics from American Architect and Building News commented that "It will be a long time before the quiet dignity of its roof and chimneys will be surpassed anywhere." More recently, the exterior was renovated by Wiss, Janney, Elstner Associates Inc. The interior was also renovated in the summer of 2016.

=== Amenities ===
The first four floors of the building all have twelve-foot ceilings and wood-paneled walls. All common rooms have two windows facing Old Campus and a fireplace, as do the oversized doubles. The majority of the building's singles face Elm Street and Cross Campus, and almost all of them have walk-in closets. The fifth floor of the building, which is lit primarily by skylight, has four connected suites with expansive common rooms. Like most freshman housing on Old Campus, there are no overhead lights inside the suites of Durfee Hall.

Durfee is the location of the Durfee Sweet Shop, the principal school-owned late-night convenience and snack store. Next door is the Yale Women's Center, also located in the basement of Durfee.

== Other ==
=== Pop culture ===
The fictional characters Rory Gilmore and Paris Geller, from the hit TV series Gilmore Girls, lived in Durfee Hall as freshmen.

Scenes from the Fox TV series Fringe (aired October 14, 2008) that were purported to be of Harvard's campus are actually filmed at Yale; Durfee Hall is plainly visible in the background.

CNN anchor Anderson Cooper lived on the first floor of Durfee Hall during his freshman year in suite D11.

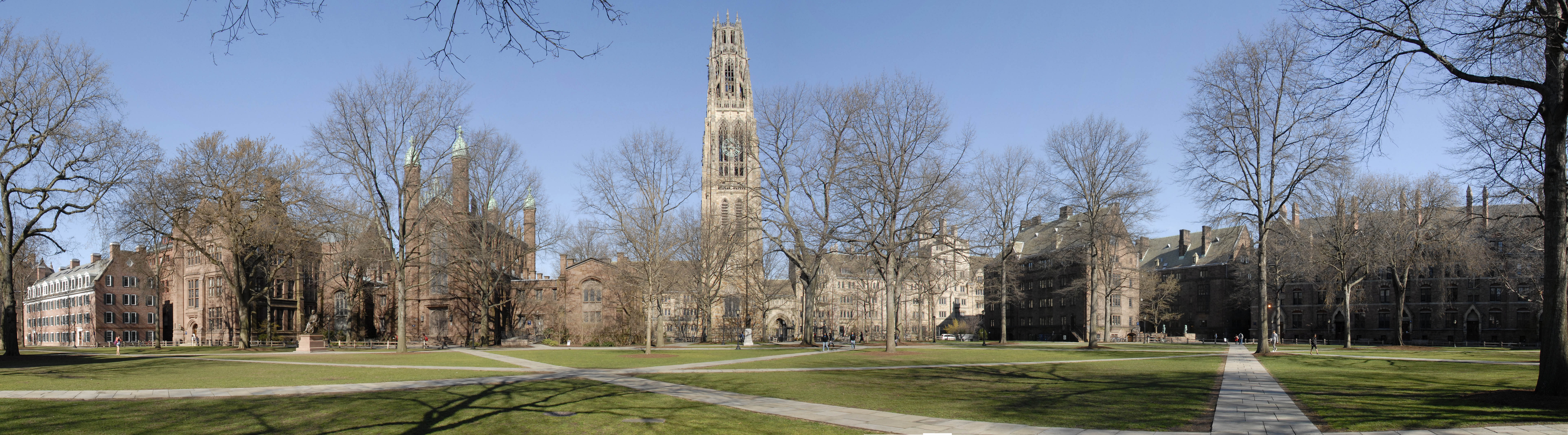
The Old Campus, 2009. Durfee Hall is on the far right.
