= Roderick Terry =

American Presbyterian clergyman and philanthropist

Roderick Terry (April 1, 1849 - December 28, 1933) was an American Presbyterian clergyman and philanthropist.

== Early life ==
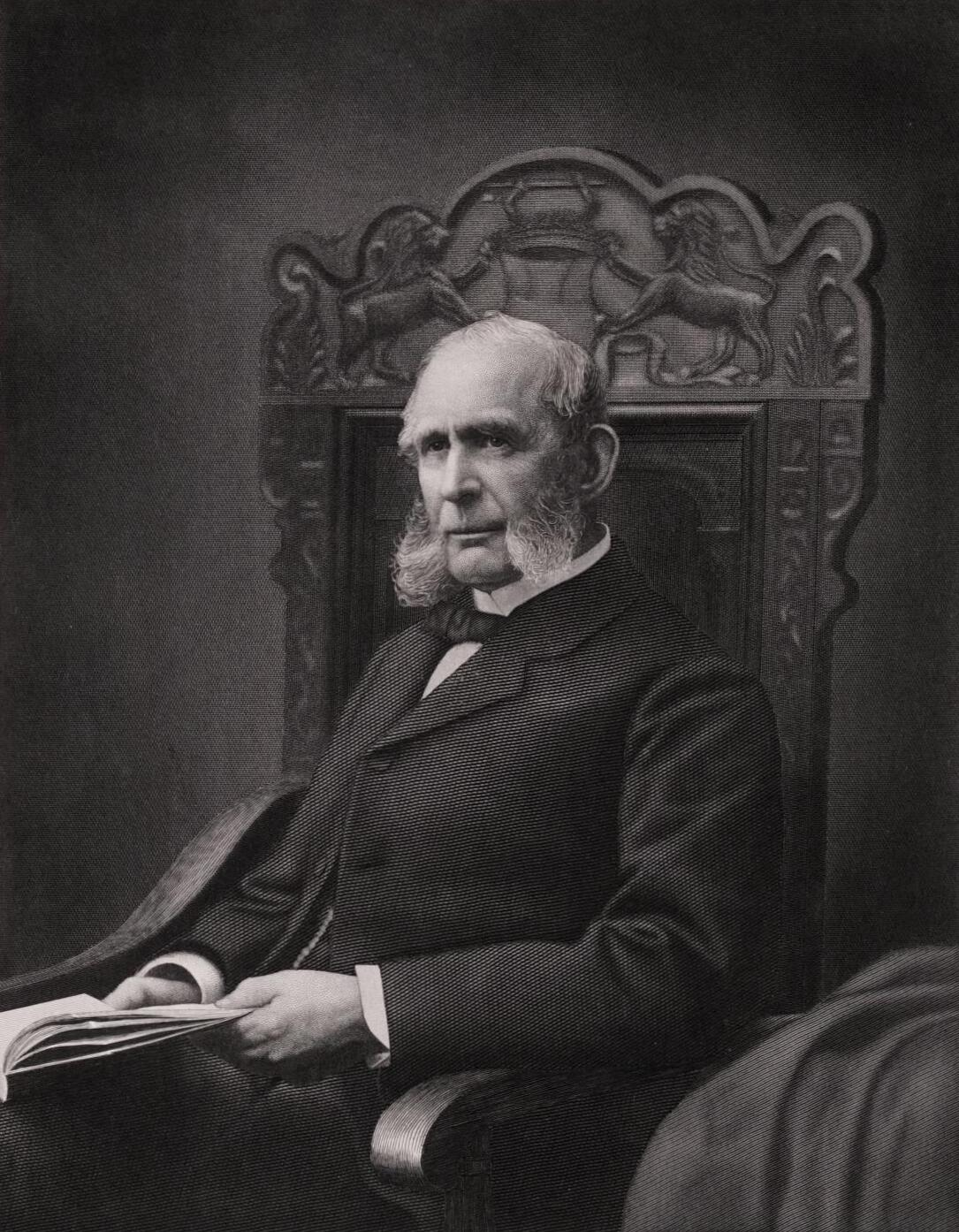
His father, John T. Terry, 1895

Terry was born in Brooklyn, New York on April 1, 1849. He was the son of Elizabeth Roe (née Peet) Terry (1826–1899) and merchant and banker John T. Terry, an associate of Edwin D. Morgan. Among his siblings were Frederick Peet Terry (who married Ellen Mills Battell), and John Taylor Terry Jr. (who married Bertha Halsted, sister of William Stewart Halsted).

His maternal grandparents were Frederick Tomlinson Peet and Elizabeth Roe (née Lockwood) Peet. His paternal grandparents were Harriet (née Taylor) Terry and Roderick Terry, a member of the Connecticut General Assembly who was president of The Exchange Bank in Hartford. Terry traced his lineage to Gov. William Bradford of Mayflower and Plymouth Colony fame as well as Continental Army Col. Nathaniel Terry.

He graduated from Yale University in 1870 and from Union Theological Seminary in New York City five years later in 1875. In 1881, Princeton University conferred on him an LL.D. degree.

== Career ==
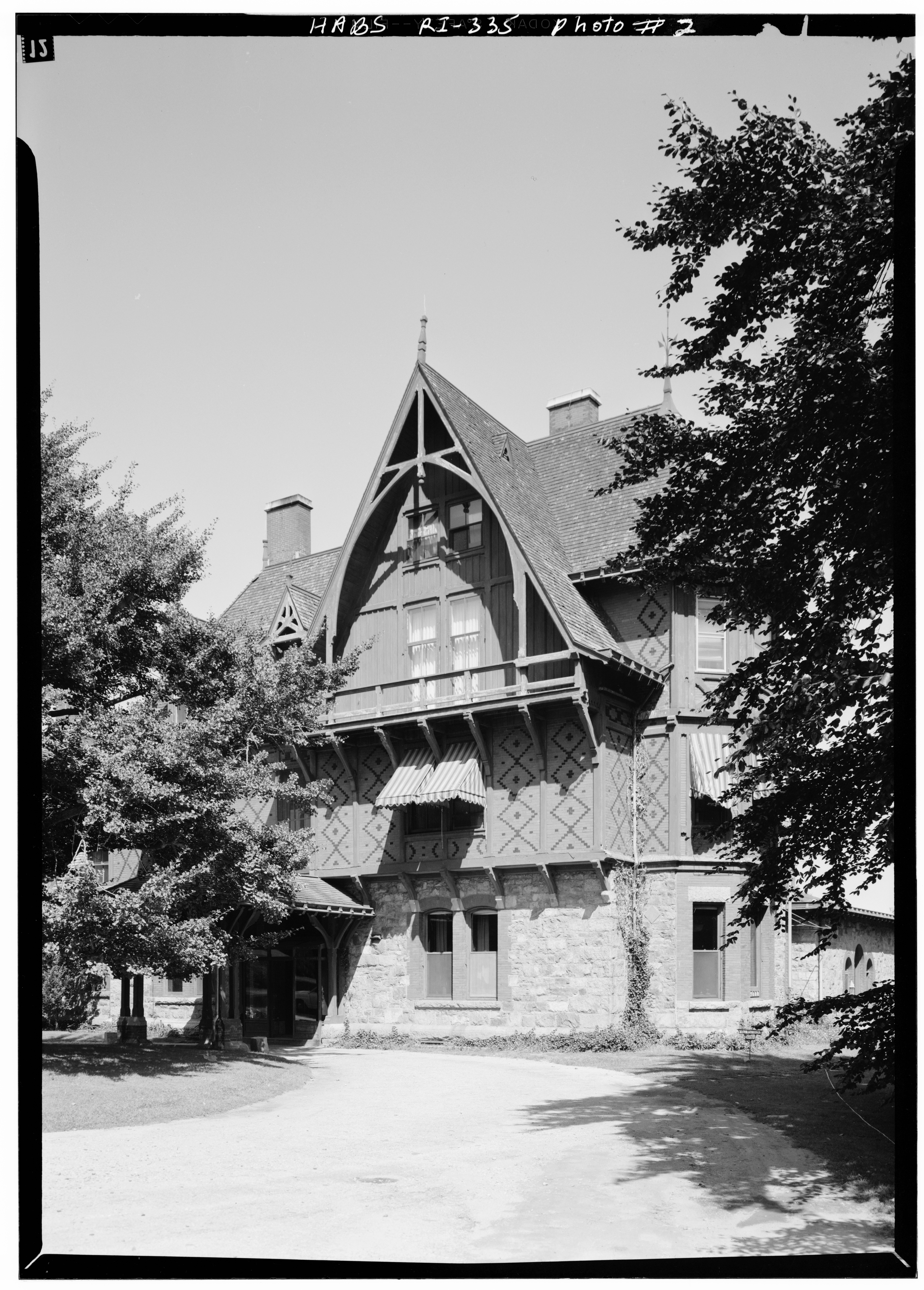
Linden Gate, the Terry home in Newport.

Shortly after graduating from Seminary, he was ordained in the Presbyterian ministry and his first church was in Peekskill in Westchester County, New York. His father had been among the founders of the Irvington Presbyterian Church in June 1853. Shortly after 1881, he became minister of the South Reformed Presbyterian Church in New York, later disbanded, which he held for twenty-four years until his retirement in 1905.

From 1890 to 1900, he served as Chaplain of the 12th Regiment Infantry New York Volunteers in the New York State National Guard. With that outfit, he took part in the Spanish-American War as a chaplain. In 1910, his name was mentioned as a possible candidate for mayor of Newport.

In 1911 Terry was elected as a hereditary member of the Connecticut Society of the Cincinnati.

In Newport, he was president of the Newport Historical Society and as president of the Board of Directors for the Redwood Library and Athenaeum from 1916 to 1933.

=== Books and manuscript collection ===
Similar to his father-in-law, who owned the famous Marquand Collection, Terry "was an assiduous collector of books and manuscripts and a major part of his collection was sold after his death (making $270,000 at three sales in 1934 and 1935), but his son did keep several thousand items." Upon his son's death in 1951, many of the items retained by him were left to the Redwood Library, including a number of letters.

== Personal life ==
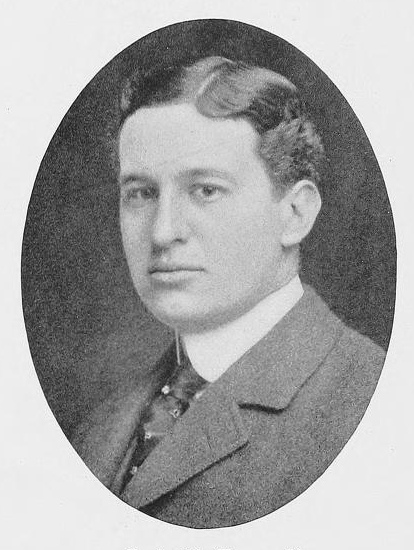
His son, Roderick Terry, Jr., 1901

On September 22, 1875, Terry married Linda Marquand (1852–1931), a daughter of Elizabeth Love (née Allen) Marquand and Henry Gurdon Marquand. Together, they lived at 169 Madison Avenue in New York City and were the parents of:

- Roderick Terry (1876–1951), a lawyer who also served as president of the Redwood Library and Athenaeum from 1940 to 1948.
- Eunice Terry (d. 1919), who married Eugene Hale Jr., a banker with Pendergast, Hale & Co. who was a son of U.S. Senator Eugene Hale and brother of U.S. Senator Frederick Hale and diplomat Chandler Hale, in 1906.

They inherited his father-in-law's home in Newport, Rhode Island, known as Linden Gate, on the corner of Rhode Island Avenue and Old Beach Road. The house was designed by noted architect Richard Morris Hunt and was built between 1872 and 1873. They were noted for their entertaining in Newport. Linden Gate, which was inherited by their son Roderick, destroyed by fire in 1973.

His wife died at Linden Gate on May 28, 1931 after a long illness. Terry died in Newport on December 28, 1933. He was buried at Island Cemetery in Newport.
