= Denison Olmsted =

American scientist (1791–1859)

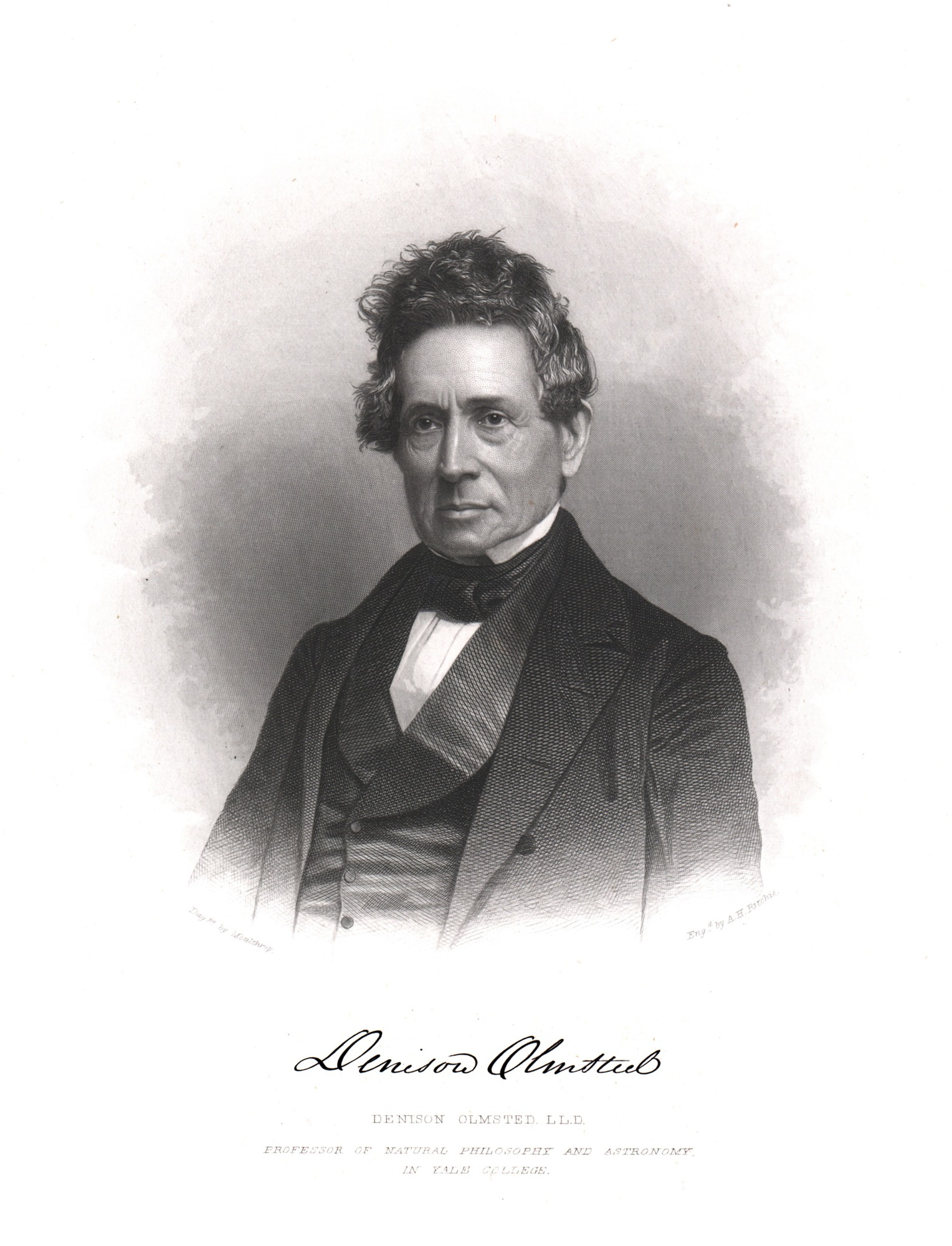
- Born: June 18, 1791; East Hartford, Connecticut
- Died: May 13, 1859 (aged 67); New Haven, Connecticut
- Education: Yale College
- Scientific career
- Workplaces: University of North Carolina at Chapel Hill; Yale College

Denison Olmsted (June 18, 1791 – May 13, 1859) was an American physicist and astronomer. Olmsted is credited with giving birth to meteor science after the 1833 Leonid meteor shower over North America spurred him to study this phenomenon.

== Biography ==
Olmsted was born June 18, 1791, in East Hartford, Connecticut. In 1813, he graduated from Yale College, where he acted as college tutor from 1815 to 1817. In the latter year, he was appointed to the chair of chemistry, mineralogy and geology in the University of North Carolina at Chapel Hill. A gold rush in North Carolina spurred the state legislature to sponsor the first state geological survey that was ever attempted in the United States. Olmsted traveled by horseback across the state collecting minerals and fossils, publishing his geological map in 1825.

In 1825, he became professor of mathematics and natural philosophy at Yale. He published an elaborate theory of hail-stones in 1830, which caused much discussion, but finally received the general approbation of meteorologists. The shower of shooting stars that fell in November 1833 attracted his attention, and he studied their history and behavior until he was able satisfactorily to demonstrate their cosmical origin. Olmsted appears to have been the earliest person to use the word radiator to mean a heating appliance in a patent of 1834 when he wrote that it was a peculiar kind of apparatus, which I call a radiator. Olmsted and his associate, Elias Loomis, were in 1835 the first American investigators to observe the Halley's Comet.

In 1836, his Yale professorship was divided, and he retained that of natural philosophy, the department of mathematics being assigned to Anthony D. Stanley. For several years, he carried on a series of observations of the aurora borealis.

Olmsted possessed considerable mechanical talent, which he used in promoting and perfecting the inventions of others, but while he himself frequently invented articles of convenience and comfort, such as the Olmsted stove, he seldom secured his rights by patents.

Olmsted died in New Haven, Connecticut, on May 13, 1859.

== Selected writings ==
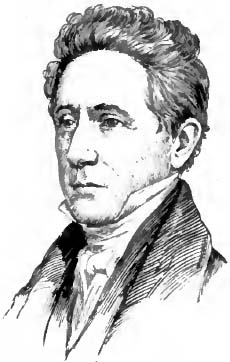

Olmsted wrote textbooks on Natural Philosophy and Astronomy, and these sold well. However, he is chiefly known to the scientific world for his observations on hail (1830), meteors and the aurora borealis (see Smithsonian Contributions, vol. viii, Washington, 1850). Others:

- Student's Commonplace Books (New Haven, 1828)
- Introduction to Natural Philosophy (2 vols., New York, 1831)
- Compendium of Natural Philosophy (1832)
- Observations on the Meteors of November 13th, 1833 (1834)
- Introduction to Astronomy (1839)
- Compendium of Astronomy (1841)
- Letters on Astronomy, Addressed to a Lady (1841)
- Life and Writings of Ebenezer Porter Mason (New York, 1842)
- Rudiments of Natural Philosophy and Astronomy (Cincinnati, 1844)

Olmsted wrote some biographical sketches, one of which became among the most influential writings on Eli Whitney. The Memoir of Eli Whitney, Esq. was first published in the American Journal of Science in 1832, seven years after Whitney's death. Details of early biographies differed, with one of the most important differences being the state of practice of cotton ginning at the time of Whitney's invention. Olmsted said workers used their fingers to separate seed from cotton, whereas others said roller gins were widely used. Thus, Olmsted said Whitney invented the cotton gin, whereas others credited him with the more modest accomplishment of inventing a new and more efficient kind of gin. Most later biographers, especially after the Civil War, adopted Olmsted's version. Meanwhile, authors writing more broadly about the southern United States elaborated on Olmsted's ideas, treating the cotton gin as a symbol of nineteenth century prosperity or of the evils of slavery.

== Family ==
His son Francis Allyn Olmsted wrote a book on Hawaii. His son Alexander Fisher Olmsted (1822–1853) was a professor of chemistry at the University of North Carolina.
