= Yale University Library =

Library system of Yale University

Coordinates: 41°18′40″N 72°55′43″W

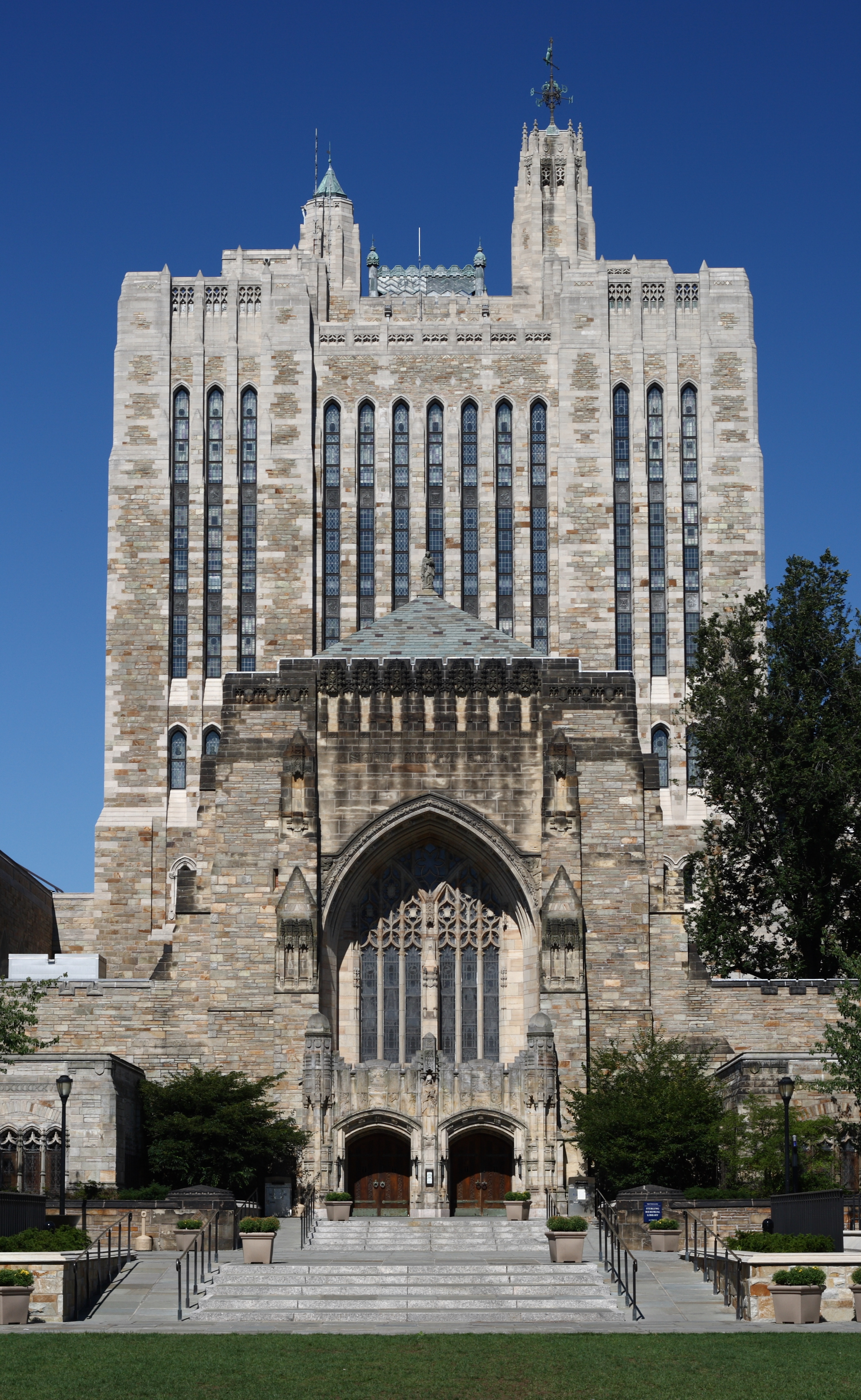
- Book tower of Sterling Memorial Library
- Location: New Haven, Connecticut, United States
- Type: Academic library
- Established: 1701
- Branches: 15

Collection
- Size: 14.9 million volumes

Other information
- Budget: US$118.8 million (2015–16)
- Director: Barbara Rockenbach
- Employees: 550 full-time employees
- Website: library.yale.edu

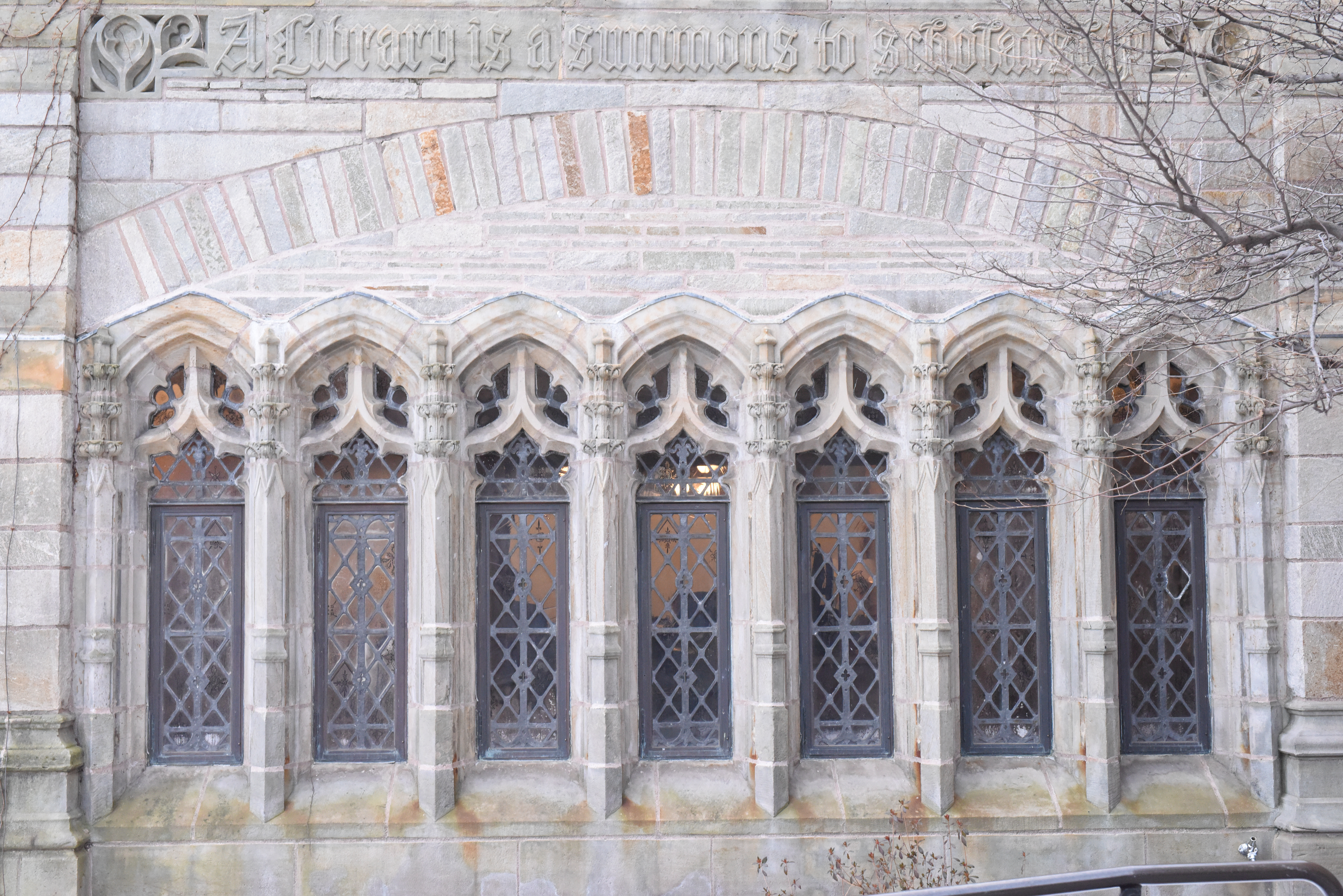
"A Library is a summons to scholarship." Sterling Memorial Library, winter 2016.

Yale University Library is the library system of Yale University in New Haven, Connecticut. Originating in 1701 with the gift of several dozen books to a new “Collegiate School," the library's collection now contains approximately 14.9 million volumes housed in fifteen university buildings and is the third-largest academic library system in North America and the second-largest housed on a singular campus.

The centerpiece of the library system is the Sterling Memorial Library, a Collegiate Gothic building constructed in 1931 and containing the main library offices, the university archives, a music library, and 3.5 million volumes. The library is also known for its major collection of rare books, housed primarily in the Beinecke Rare Book and Manuscript Library as well as the Cushing/Whitney Medical Library, the Lillian Goldman Law Library, and the Lewis Walpole Library in Farmington, Connecticut. Many schools and departments at Yale also maintain their own collections, comprising twelve on-campus facilities and an off-campus shelving facility.

The library subscribes to hundreds of research databases. Along with the Harvard Library and Columbia Libraries, it was a founding member of the Research Libraries Group consortium. The library is also a member of Borrow Direct, allowing patrons to check out volumes from major American research universities.

== History ==
=== Establishment (1650–1786) ===
Throughout the Collegiate School's nascence in the early 18th century, books were the most valuable assets the school could acquire. Although New Haven Colony founder John Davenport began collecting books for a college library in New Haven in the 1650s, the college is said to have been founded by the gift of “forty folios” in Branford, Connecticut by its ten founding Congregational ministers. All were theological texts, and those surviving are now stored in the Beinecke Library.

In the school's first three decades, three gifts established Yale's collection. In 1714, Jeremiah Dummer, Connecticut's colonial agent in Boston, wrote to distinguished English scholars requesting gifts of books for the colony's college, then operating in Saybrook, Connecticut. Over 800 volumes arrived in Boston and were sent to the college. Among the contributors were leading scientists including Isaac Newton, John Woodward, and Edmond Halley, who sent copies of their own tracts among their donations. Religious figures, including Richard Bentley, White Kennett, and Matthew Henry, fortified the theological collections, and other books arrived from Richard Steele, Richard Blackmore, and Dummer himself, who ultimately gave the college about two hundred books.

Four years later, Elihu Yale, who had previously given some books at Dummer's behest, sent 300 books along with other goods from his estate in Wales. The school, recently moved to New Haven, took Yale's name in recognition of the bequest. A third major donation arrived fifteen years later, when philosopher-bishop George Berkeley donated his 1,000-volume, a major assembly of classical works library to the school. Now holding a sizeable collection, Yale President Thomas Clap decided to catalogue the collection for the first time, then housed in the college's only building, the College House.

This first inventory already showed evidence of book losses and thefts. During the move from Saybrook to New Haven, residents angry to lose the collection overturned the ox-carts carrying the books and liberated much of the college's collection for private use. The collection, then about 4,000 items in total, was sent inland during the Revolutionary War, a move that culled nearly a third of the collection.

=== 19th Century growth and the first College Library (1790–1930) ===
The library moved often during its first 150 years while the campus’ Old Brick Row was erected. From the all-timber College House it moved to the First Chapel (Athaneum) after its construction in 1763, to the new Lyceum building in 1804, then to the new Second Chapel in 1824. The first dedicated home for the collection, the College Library, was constructed between 1842 and 1846 and held the collection for almost ninety years. The Victorian Gothic building, designed by Henry Austin and considered an extravagance in its day, was modeled after Gore Hall, the library of Harvard College. Two university-affiliated literary societies, Linonia and Brothers in Unity, were given rooms in the library for their 10,000-book collections, as was the collection of the American Oriental Society. As the collection swelled beyond the building's 50,000-book capacity, it became necessary to add annex buildings to the Library: Chittenden Hall was finished in 1890, and Linsly Hall in 1906.

=== Sterling Library and research collections (1920–) ===
As the collection surpassed one million volumes in the 20th century, it became clear that the library would need a new building. In 1917, a $17-million bequest from John W. Sterling, stipulating Yale build "at least one enduring, useful and architecturally beautiful edifice," provided the means. The collection was moved to the Sterling Memorial Library in 1931, which quadrupled the library's shelving capacity and offered dedicated rooms for periodicals, reference works, and special collections.

Although it had received many important books and manuscripts pertaining to the contemporaneous development of science, the American colonies, and ecclesiastical history, it had received only piecemeal historical contributions, such as the Assyrian tablets received in 1855 that founded the Babylonian Collection. Beginning under the librarianship of Andrew Keogh in 1924, the library undertook a purposeful program of collecting rare books, personal papers, and archival works. English professor Chauncey Brewster Tinker mounted a campaign among Yale alumni to purchase or donate valuable items, and early gifts included a complete copy of the Gutenberg Bible, the papers of Gertrude Stein and Ezra Pound, and the papers of James Boswell. Having amassed a major rare books collection, the university established the Beinecke Library in 1963 as a specialized rare books storage and preservation facility, and leaving the Sterling Library's former Rare Book Room with a more modest archival collection.

The Sterling library is also home to the largest collection of Benjamin Franklin papers in the world, which it received as a gift in 1935 from William Smith Mason, of the Yale class of 1888, and is considered the largest and most valuable collection of materials ever given to the library. It is headquarters for the editorial staff who are collating and publishing The Papers of Benjamin Franklin, an ongoing effort which began in 1954 and is expected to include up to 50 volumes, containing more than 30,000 extant Franklin papers.

More specialized facilities would follow: the Kline Science Library absorbed the library's science collections, the Mudd Library received social science books, and smaller libraries in engineering, physics, and geology were established by academic departments. By 2000, the library had expanded to more than a dozen facilities around campus, and retained over 500 staff. In 2012, many of the Science Hill libraries were re-consolidated at Kline Science Library as the Center for Science and Social Science Information. In 2020, the Center for Science and Social Science Information was then renamed as the Marx Science and Social Science Library in recognition of a permanent endowment created by the Marx family. Nancy Marx Better, who spearheaded the endowment, graduated from Yale in 1984, is the chair of the University Library Council, and received the Yale Medal in 2019. Nancy Marx Better's father, Leonard Marx Jr., and grandfather, Leonard Marx, both graduated from Yale University and then worked in real estate.

== Facilities ==
=== Sterling Memorial Library ===
The library's largest building, Sterling Memorial Library, contains about four million volumes in the humanities, social sciences, area studies, as well as several special collections projects and the department of Manuscripts and Archives. The Irving S. Gilmore Music Library resides within Sterling Library, and the building is connected via tunnel to the underground Bass Library, a facility for frequently-used materials.

=== Beinecke Rare Book and Manuscript Library ===
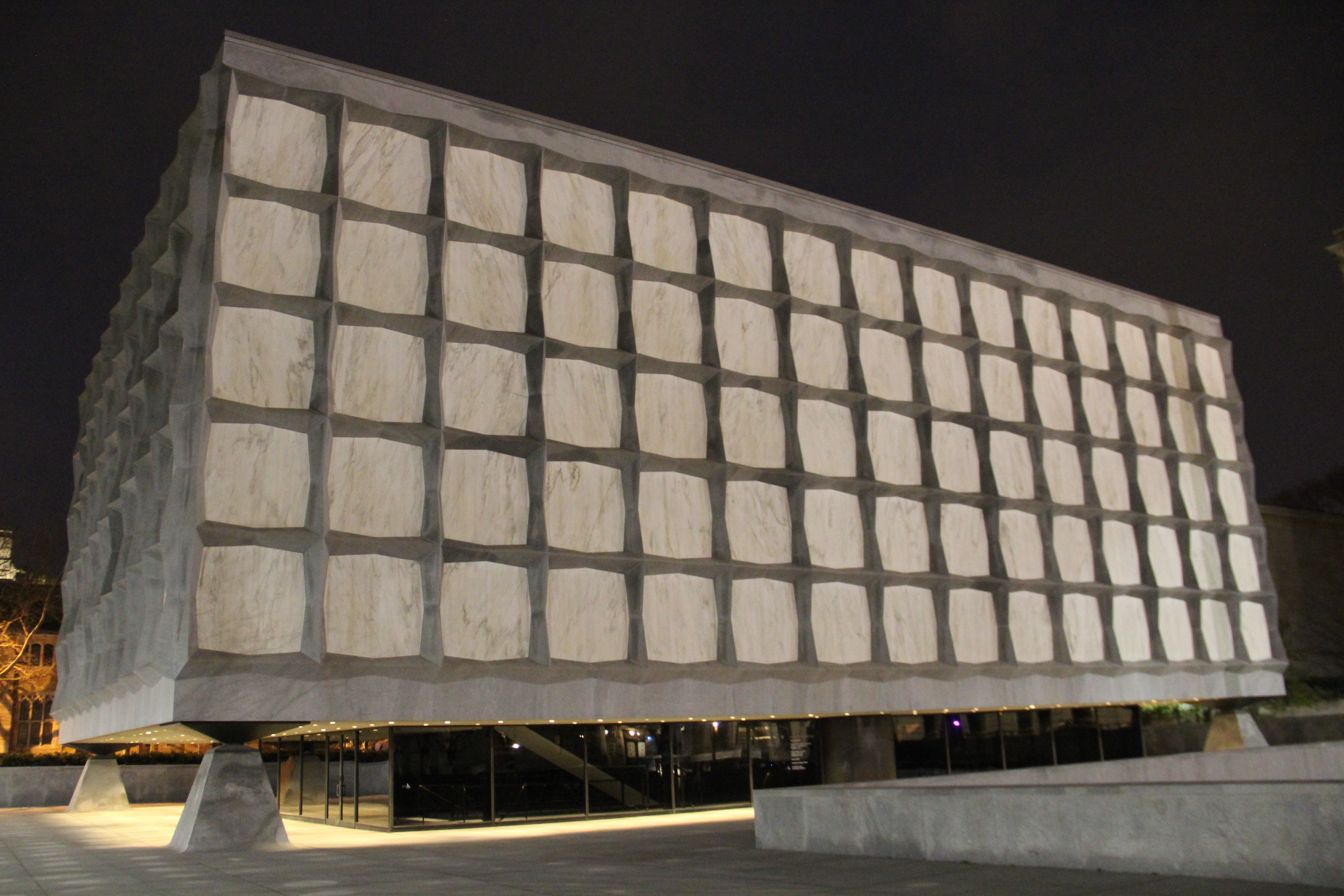
Beinecke Rare Book Library

Opened in 1963, the Beinecke Rare Book and Manuscript Library is the library's principal repository of rare and historical books and manuscripts. It holds approximately 800,000 volumes, including a Gutenberg Bible, the Voynich manuscript, the Vinland map, and the papers and manuscripts of major authors and artists, with particular strengths in American literature.

=== Lillian Goldman Law Library ===
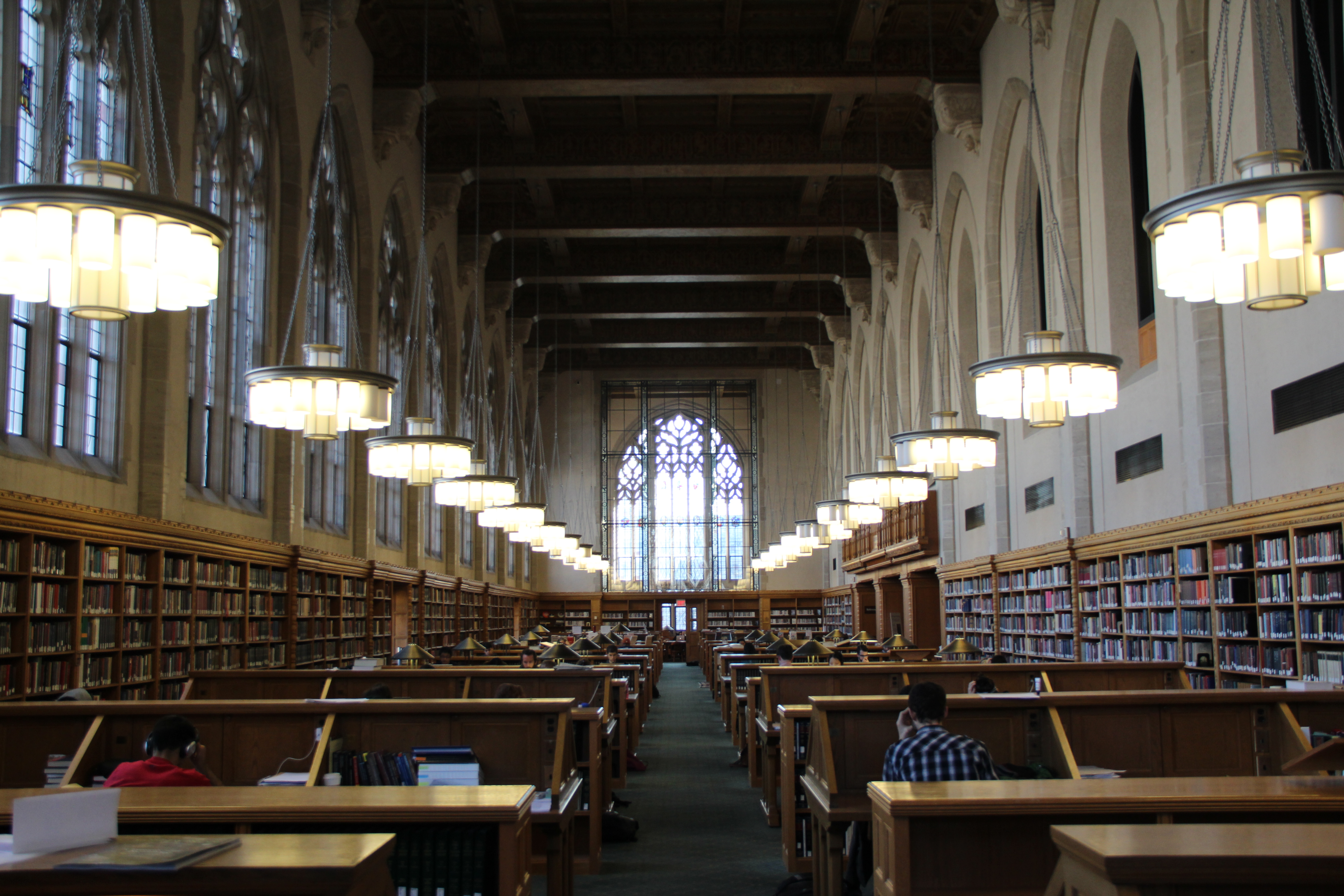
Law Library main reading room

The Lillian Goldman Law Library, situated in Sterling Law Building of the Yale Law School, contains nearly 800,000 volumes relating to law and jurisprudence. These include one of the most significant collections of rare books pertaining to legal history, as well as the most complete collection of William Blackstone's commentaries.

=== Other major facilities ===
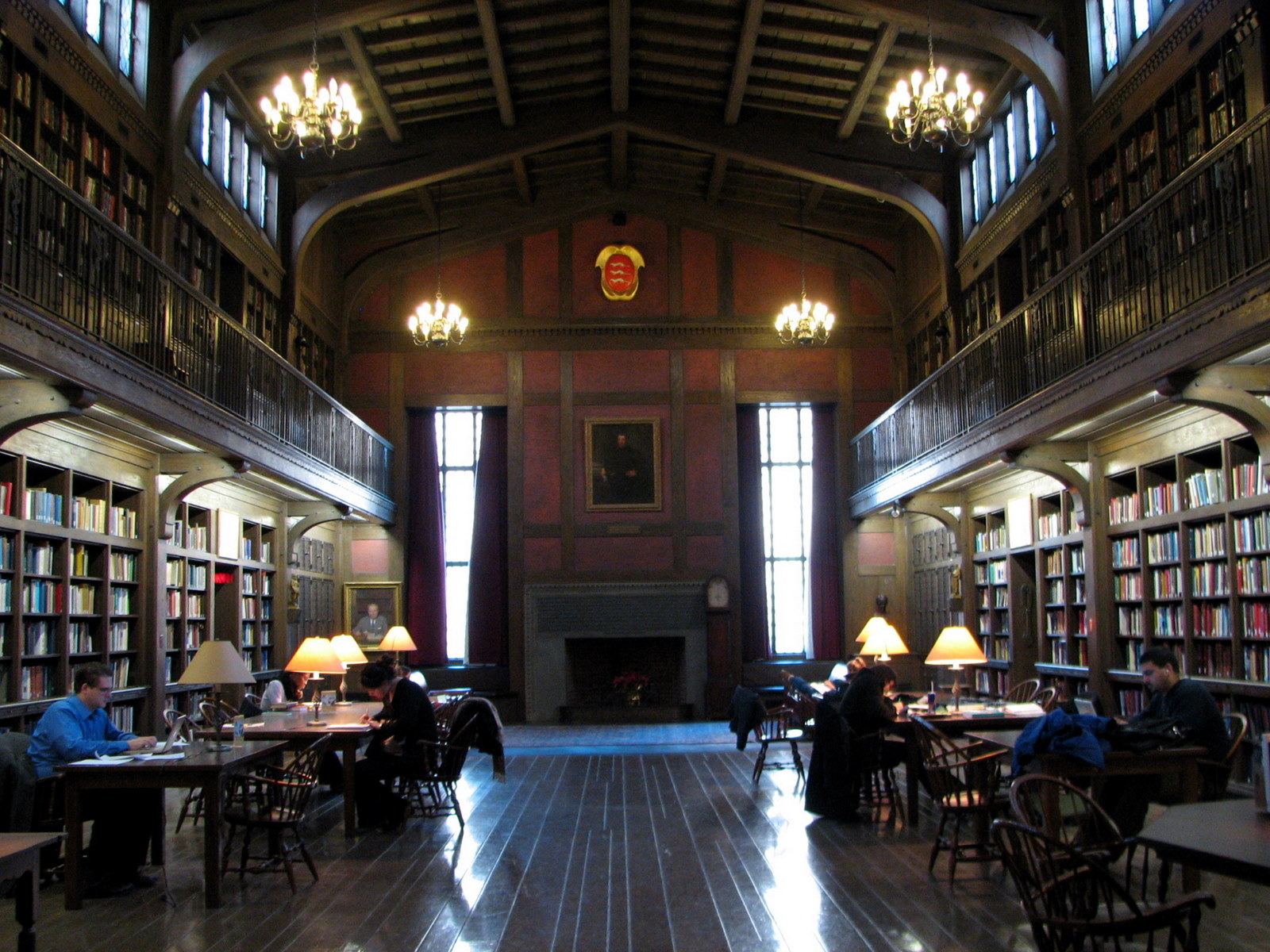
Harvey Cushing/John Hay Whitney Medical Library

The Harvey Cushing/John Hay Whitney Medical Library, Yale's medical library, houses a collection of historical medical works. The Center for Science and Social Science Information, situated in Kline Biology Tower on Science Hill, contains science and social science works consolidated from the former Kline Science Library facilities. The Haas Arts Library in Rudolph Hall houses art and architectural materials. The Yale Film Archive is a film archive with a collection of 35mm and 16mm film prints and original elements, as well as films on Blu-ray, DVD, and VHS.

The Yale University Library includes libraries beyond its campus in New Haven. The Lewis Walpole Library in Farmington, Connecticut is a research library for eighteenth-century studies and the prime source for the study of Horace Walpole and Strawberry Hill. The Library Shelving Facility, a closed-access, climate-controlled facility that houses 4 million infrequently-accessed volumes, is located in Hamden, Connecticut.
