= Robert Reed (artist) =

American artist (1938–2014)

Robert James Reed
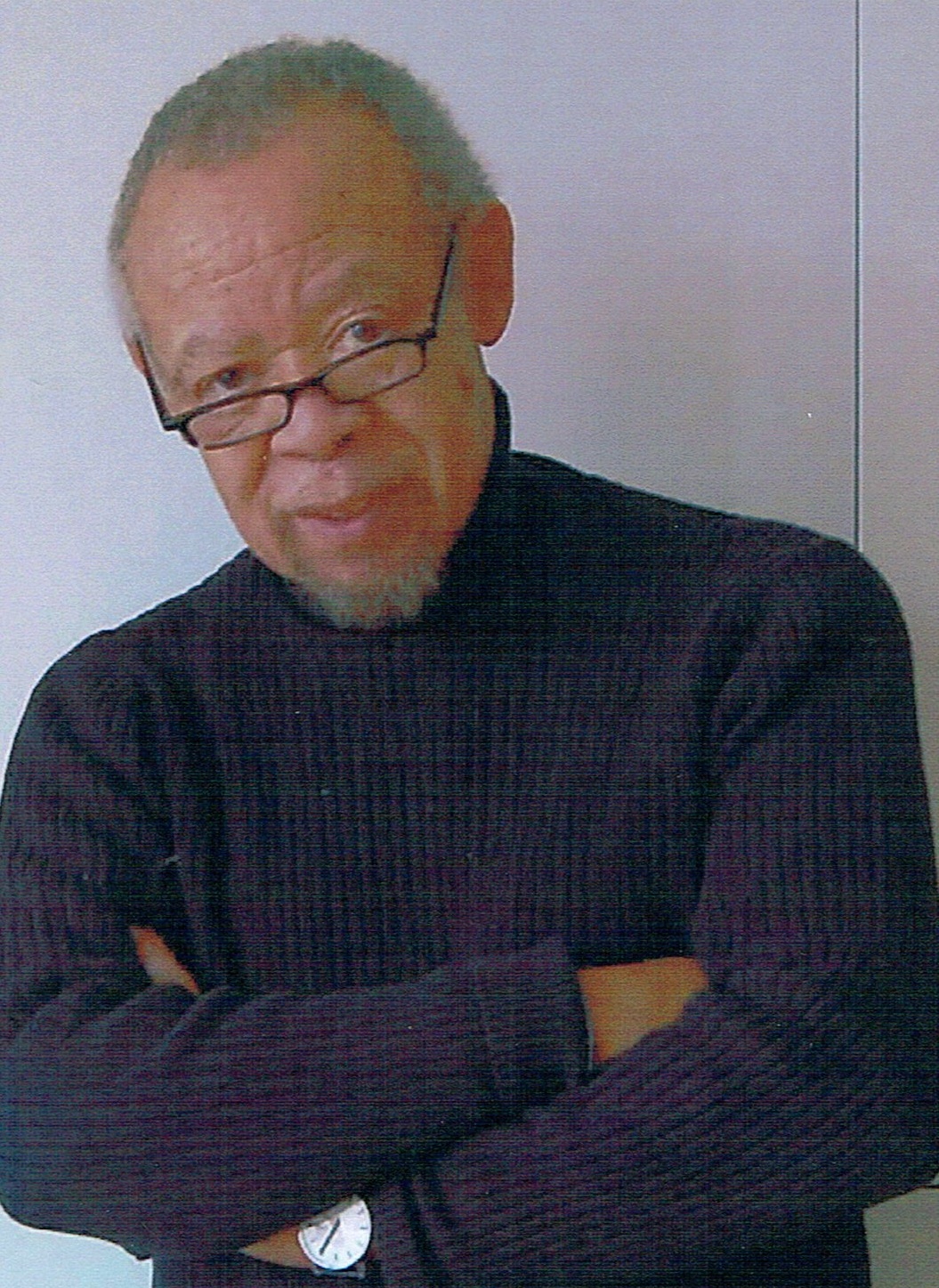
- Born: Robert James Reed Jr. July 9, 1938; Charlottesville, Virginia, U.S.
- Died: December 26, 2014 (aged 76); New Haven, Connecticut, U.S.

Robert James Reed Jr. (July 9, 1938 – December 26, 2014) was an American artist and professor of painting and printmaking at Yale School of Art for 45 years. In 1987, Reed was appointed to Yale School of Art's tenured permanent faculty making him, at the time of his death, the School's first and only African-American to be so appointed in the School's then 145 year history. In his artwork, Reed is known for his geometric abstraction and personalized symbols to create a language of abstraction. He employs abstract symbols, color and deeply textured brushwork to create his iconic imagery. As Reed would explain, fragments, paths, cultural and universal signs and symbols, remembered childhood images and places are organized into his imagery. His abstractions are referential and have their basis in "real" form that exists solidly in the real world in real space. His work includes paintings, drawings, monotypes, prints and collages.

== Early life and education ==
Reed was born in Charlottesville, Virginia, in 1938. He attended segregated public elementary (Jefferson) and high (Burley) schools in Charlottesville. He graduated with a B.A. from Morgan State, an historically black college in Baltimore, Maryland (1958). However, unable to make the final tuition payment Reed's graduation date was recorded as 1959 when he was able to pay off what he owed. He earned his B.F.A. (1960) and M.F.A. (1962) at Yale School of Art. While at Yale, Reed studied with and was influenced by Josef Albers, Neil Welliver, and Jon Schueler. In later years, he was influenced by Philip Guston who was a colleague at Skidmore College in the mid-1960s.

While a student at Yale, Reed was selected to attend Yale Norfolk Summer School of Art in 1960. Reed credited this summer experience as being pivotal to his development as an artist. There he meet another student, Özer Kabas. When Reed returned to Yale at the end of the program, Kabas arranged a job for Reed working for Josef Albers. Mr. Albers, as Reed always referred to him, hired Reed to work at Albers's studio in Yale's Street Hall in preparing Albers's first Interaction of Color book. Reed's job was doing the mixing for the plates. The plates were given to Reed and his job was to take the colors and mix them in silkscreen ink and to record the color recipes. Albers would come in regularly and say "Yes" and "No" keeping tabs on Reed's work. The recipes would then go to the silkscreen company.

Reed was an ardent adherent of Albers's pedagogy and Foundation Studies in art which Reed continued to advocate throughout his teaching career.

== Career ==
=== Academic ===
Reed's career as an art educator began as an assistant professor at the Minneapolis College of Art and Design in 1962. This was followed by his appointment as assistant professor at Skidmore College in Saratoga Springs, New York, from 1965 to 1969.

Reed's 45-year teaching career at the Yale School of Art began in 1969 as assistant professor of painting, followed by appointment to the tenured permanent faculty as professor of painting in 1987, a position he held until his death in 2014.

From 1970 to 1975, Reed served as director of the Yale Summer School of Art. Over the five years of his directorship, he assembled a summer faculty of artists which included Philip Guston, Arnold Bittleman, Erwin Hauer, Gabor Peterdi, Joan Snyder, Chuck Close, Al Held, Lester Johnson, Judy Pfaff, Romare Bearden, and Sam Gilliam. Reed was known to periodically take his undergraduate students to Norfolk where he would recreate a truncated Norfolk experience over the course of a weekend.

Reed served as juror or curator for numerous shows including the Creative Arts Workshop in New Haven, Connecticut, Silvermine Arts Center in New Canaan, and Artspace in New Haven.

Reed was a guest artist and lecturer at over 60 colleges and universities throughout the country and in Europe.

He authored several art education programs including Acre, Spokane, Washington; Site, Cancun, Mexico; SIX: Summer In Experiment, Saratoga, New York; and The Institute for Studio Studies, Auvillar, France.

He served on the board of directors of Lyme Academy College of Fine Arts 2010–2012; the MacDowell Colony, 1987–1990, and Virginia Center for Creative Arts.

=== Artistic ===
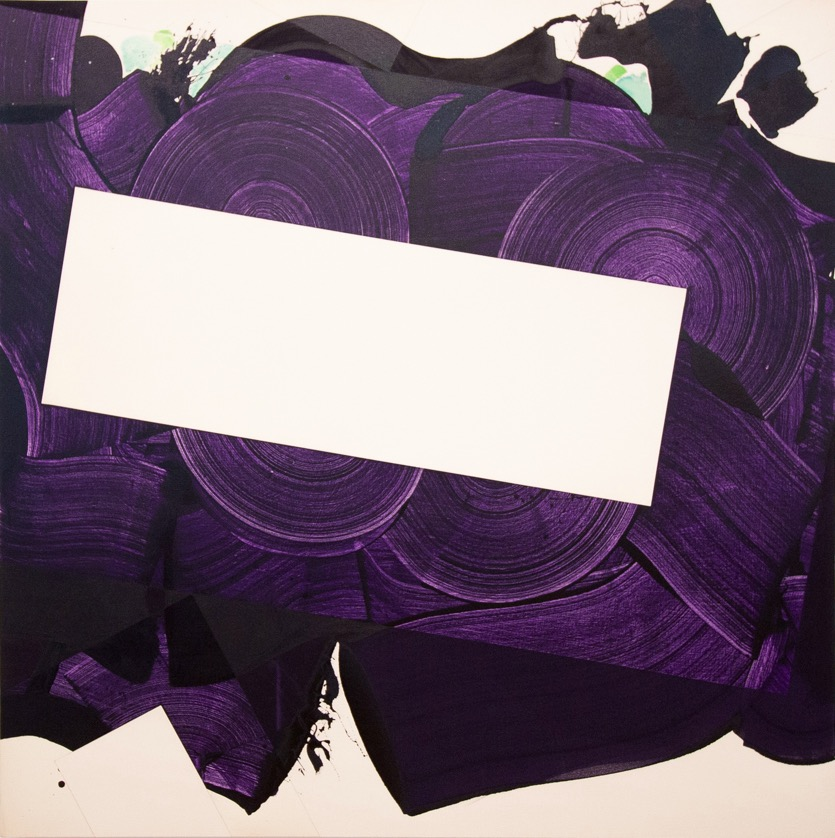
Plum Nellie, Sea Stone, 1972 acrylic on canvas 72" x 72" Collection: Whitney Museum of American Art

Throughout his academic career, Reed continued to be a prolific artist producing new bodies of work every 8 to 10 years. His artistic career began in the 1960s and found early success with a one-man show at the Whitney Museum of American Art in 1973. A committed abstractionist, he resisted pressure in the 1970s to create Black identity art. As Reed would state in a 1986 interview "I think of myself as an artist who is Black. An artist who goes to the same well as Black identity artists for metaphors for experiences that I have had in the stereotype Black experience. I know what it is to automatically go to the back of the bus. I know what it is to be spat on. And you find some other way or representing that." However, Reed was, for the most part, overlooked during the Black Arts movement of the 1960s and 1970s. He continued to work in a self-imposed obscurity due in part to his persistence in developing his personal visual and symbolic language of abstraction; and in part to the tragic and untimely death both his mother and sister, his only sibling, in 1965 which left him deeply reclusive about both his personal and artistic life.

The most recognizable of Reed's bodies of work are:

- Plum Nellie (1970s): the use of symbolic color as a reaction to his Interaction of Color experience in which color is a character and landscape;
- San Romano from the 1980s pays homage to Paulo Uccello's sixteenth century paintings of Battles of San Romano;
- Tree For Mine (1990s), a personal exploration of the people and places of Reed's remembered childhood home of Charlottesville, Virginia;
- Galactic Journal (2000s), a highly autobiographical work journaling the paths of his life over nearly eight decades

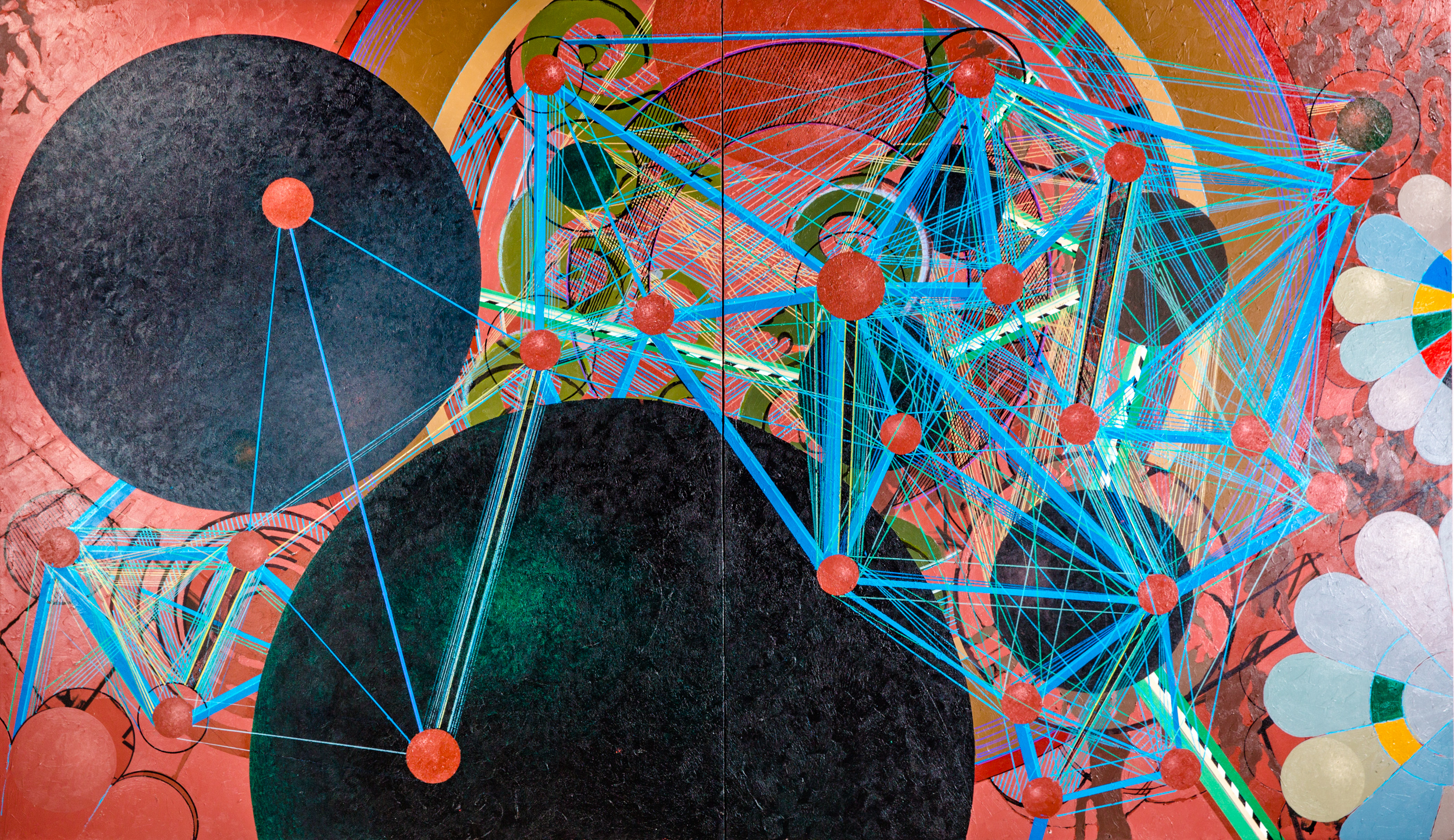
Galactic Journal, Washington Park 1999–2009 acrylic on canvas 84" x 144"

== Collections, awards, and exhibitions ==
Reed's works are in the permanent collections of a number of museums, including the Whitney Museum of American Art, New York, NY; National Academy Museum, New York, NY; Hirshhorn Museum and Sculpture Garden, Washington, DC; Minneapolis Institute of Art, Minneapoli, MN; Walker Art Center, Minneapolis, M; Yale University Art Gallery, New Haven, CT; Fralin Museum of Art, Charlottesville, Va.; Ogden Museum of Southern Art New Orleans; Detroit Institute of Art, Detroit, MI; the African American Museum, Dallas, TX; the Martin Museum of Art, Baylor University, Waco, TX, and the Perez Art Museum Miami, FL; among others.

His work was also included among the 407 artists exhibited in the 2015 inaugural exhibition "America Is Hard To See" for the opening of the new Whitney Museum of American Art, New York, New York.

Reed is the recipient of a number of awards and honors including:

- Yale University, William Devane Medalist for outstanding undergraduate teaching 2014;
- National Academy of Design fellow, New York, 2009
- College Art Association Distinguished Teaching of Art Award, 2004;
- Honorary Doctorate of Fine Arts, Minneapolis College of Art and Design, 2001
- National Council of Arts Administrators Award, 2000
- Virginia Center for the Creative Arts residency, 1987
- Yaddo residency, 1980
- Dartmouth Artist in Residence, 1976

In recognition of Reed's contribution to undergraduate teaching, the Robert Reed Scholarship Fund at the Yale School of Art was established and the Yale School of Art building, GO1 classroom was named in his honor as the "Robert Reed Studio" where Reed's admonition to his basic drawing students is inscribed at the entry "Drawing is a search, not a destination".

In further recognition of his contribution to the Yale School of Art, a solo retrospective exhibition of his work was held in 2015, "Robert Reed: Non-Stop Painting", curated by Robert Storr, former dean, Yale School of Art.

== Personal life ==
Reed was a member of the Alpha Iota chapter of Kappa Alpha Psi fraternity since 1956 having served as president of his line.

Reed died of cancer in New Haven, Connecticut, on December 26, 2014. Reed is buried at the historic Grove Street Cemetery in New Haven.
