= Connecticut Hall =

Building at Yale University

- U.S. National Register of Historic Places
- U.S. National Historic Landmark
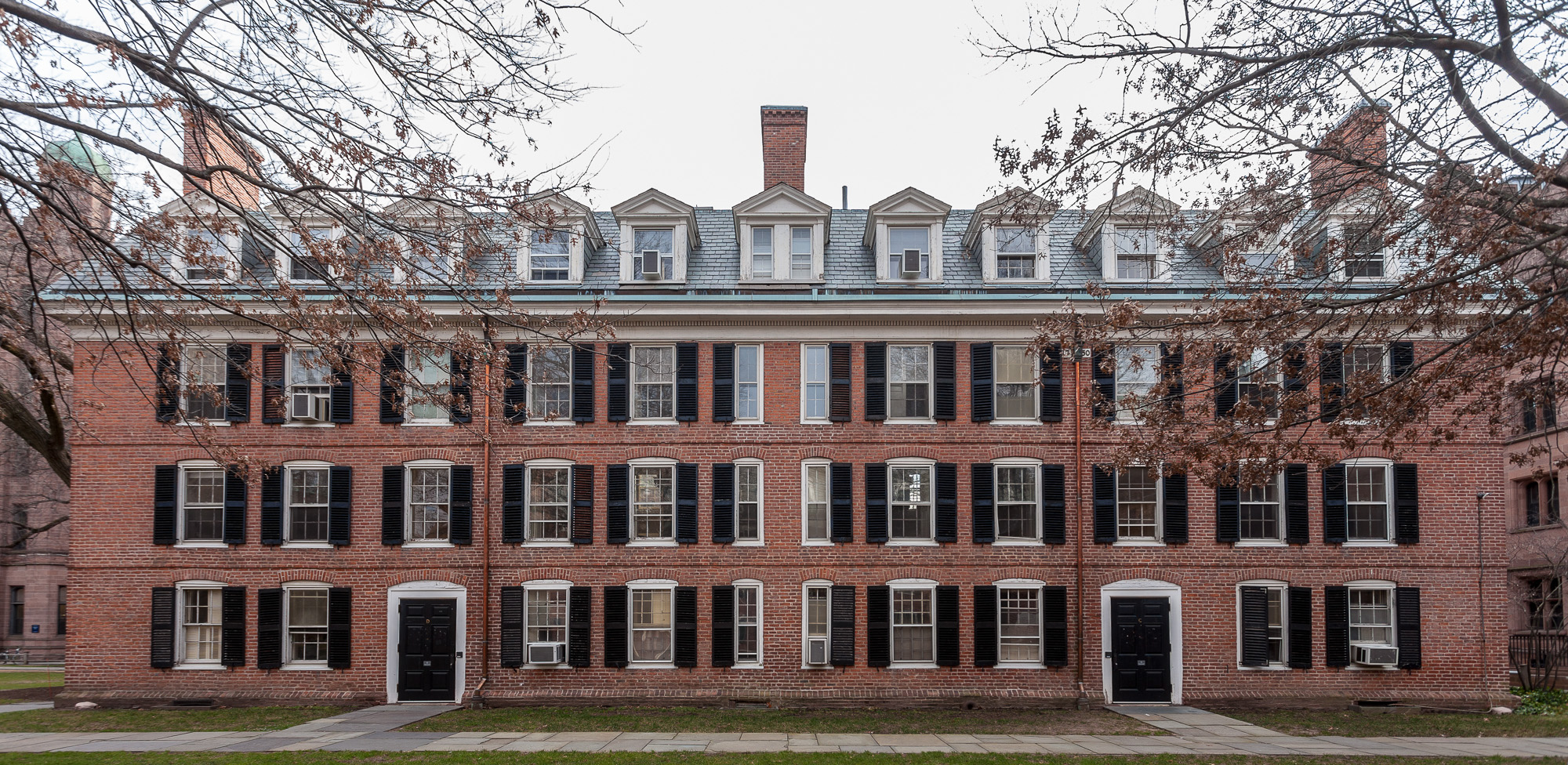
- Connecticut Hall
- Location: 1017 Chapel Street; New Haven, Connecticut, United States
- Coordinates: 41°18′29.25″N 72°55′46.13″W
- Built: 1752
- Architect: Francis Letort, Thomas Bills
- Architectural style: Georgian
- Restored: 1952
- Restored by: Douglas Orr
- NRHP reference No.: 66000806

Significant dates
- Added to NRHP: October 15, 1966
- Designated NHL: December 21, 1965

Connecticut Hall (formerly South Middle College) is a Georgian building on the Old Campus of Yale University. Completed in 1752, it was originally a student dormitory, a function it retained for 200 years. Part of the first floor became home to the Yale College Dean's Office after 1905, and the full building was converted to departmental offices in the mid-twentieth century. It is currently used by the Department of Philosophy, and its third story contains a room for meetings of the Yale Faculty of Arts & Sciences, the academic faculty of Yale College and the Graduate School.

Connecticut Hall is the third-oldest of only seven surviving American colonial-era college buildings, and the second-oldest structure built for Yale College in New Haven. It was built, in part, by slaves. The first building in a campus plan known as Old Brick Row that stood from 1750 to 1870, it is the only survivor of a demolition campaign that created the modern Old Campus quadrangle. It was designated a National Historic Landmark in 1965.

== History ==
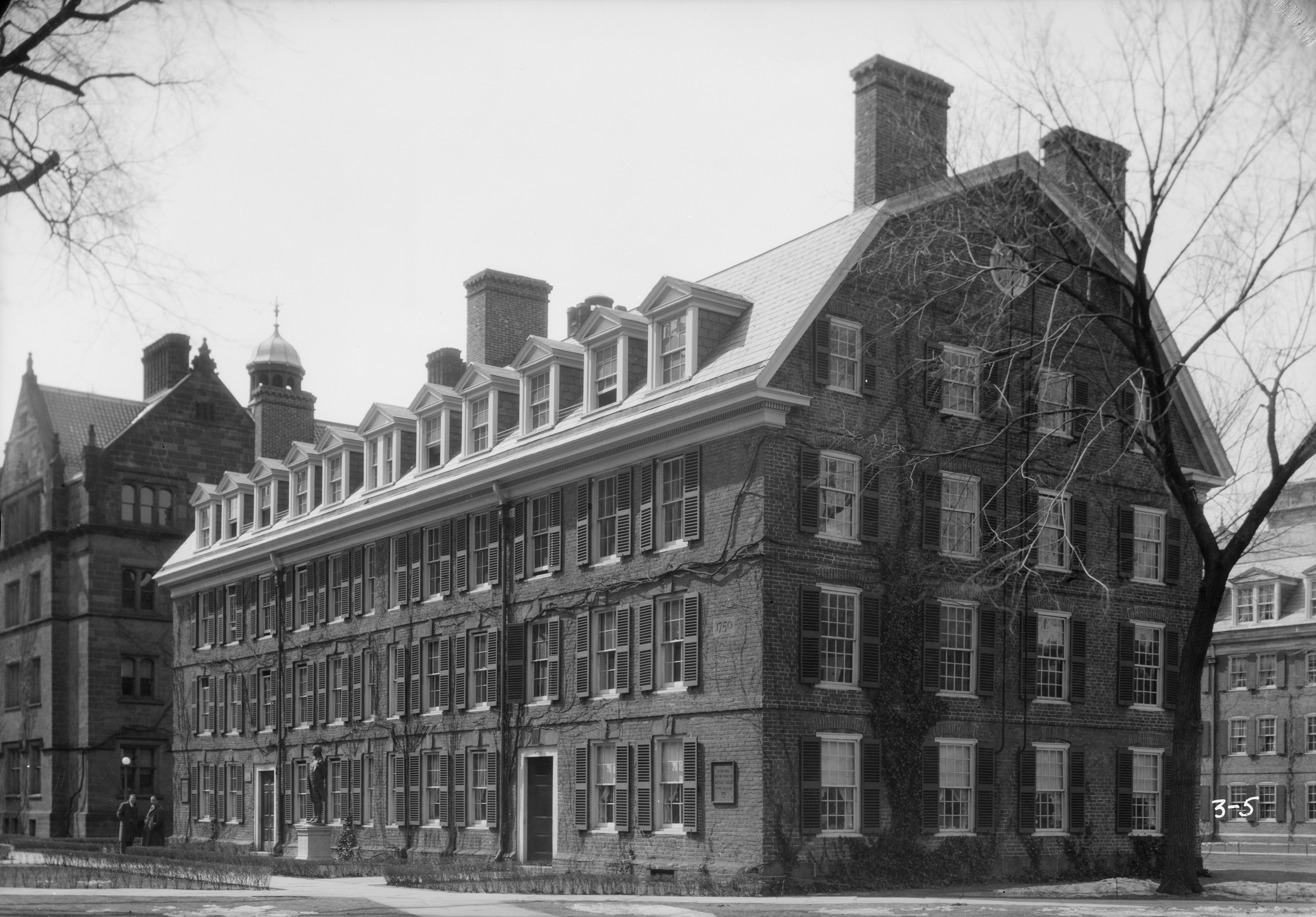
Connecticut Hall as a residential building, 1934

When Yale College moved to New Haven in 1718, the town had constructed a wooden building known as the College House for its occupancy at the corner of College and Chapel Streets. By 1747, the College House held less than half of the college's enrolled students, and college president Thomas Clap announced that funds would be raised from the Colony of Connecticut for a "new College House" of three stories. The money used to fund the project came from the sale of a French ship captured by a privateer, a lottery, and a grant from the Connecticut Assembly. Construction, completed by 1752, was headed by Francis Letort and Thomas Bills, who also designed the college's next building, the First Chapel. Among the construction workers were at least five enslaved Africans, one of whom was owned by Yale president Thomas Clap, who were recorded as having worked for 436.5 days. The new dormitory was built 100 feet (30 m) long, 40 feet (12 m) wide, three stories tall. Because President Clap instructed the builders to follow plans he received from Harvard University, it was nearly a duplicate of Harvard's Massachusetts Hall, completed in 1720. In its original incarnation, just under one hundred rooms were fit under its gambrel roof.

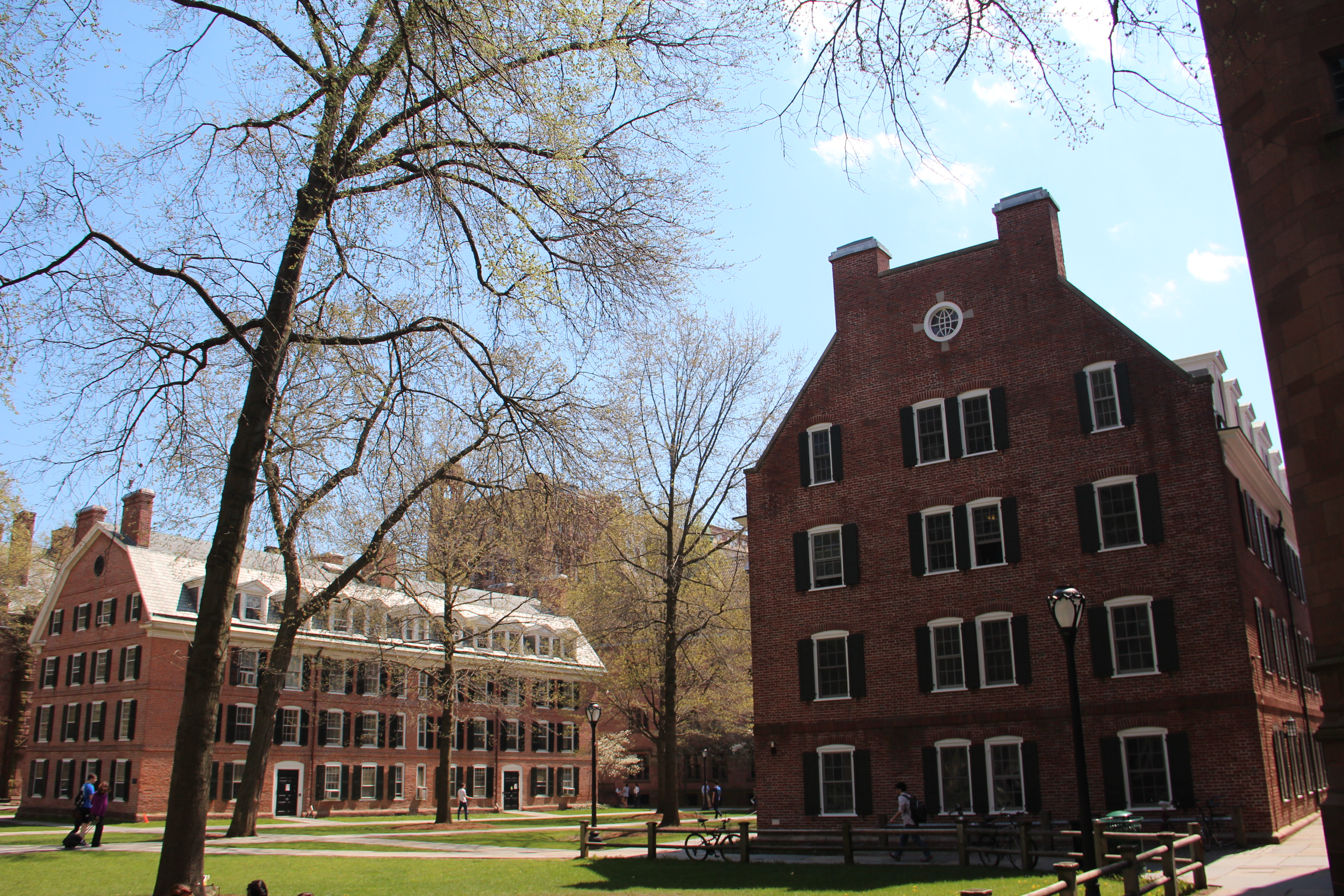
Connecticut Hall at left and McClellan Hall, built in 1925 as a replica of Connecticut Hall, at right.

Connecticut Hall became the anchor and template for Old Brick Row's building pattern, and became known as South Middle College as buildings were added to its north and south. By 1824, Old Brick Row had four "colleges" resembling Connecticut Hall: Union Hall (South College), Connecticut Hall (South Middle College), Berkeley Hall (North Middle College), and North College. When Old Brick Row was slated for demolition in the early 20th century, Connecticut Hall was saved by a group of alumni led by Professor Henry W. Farnam.

In 1925, Yale broke ground on McClellan Hall, a student dormitory that mimicked the appearance of Connecticut Hall. At the time, many students and faculty felt Connecticut Hall was an obsolete structure that marred the campus' beauty. They objected to the administration's sudden plans to erect a facsimile building to balance its presence on the Old Campus. They dubbed McClellan "Hush Hall" and staged a "Pageant of Symmetry" to oppose its construction.

The building has been renovated several times and appears substantially different from its early appearance and function. A 1797 addition swapped the gambrel roof for a fourth story and a pitched roof. In 1905, a restoration led by Grosvenor Atterbury rebuilt the gambrel roof, bringing the building closer to its original form. From 1952 to 1954, the structure was reconstructed in which the building interior was gutted the structure and rebuilt for reading, seminar and faculty rooms.

== Uses ==
Connecticut Hall remained a student dormitory for nearly 200 years, but has always been joined by other uses. Lacking sufficient space, Thomas Clap and other faculty would hold class sessions in the entryways. Before purpose-built structures could be constructed, a physics laboratory, art gallery, and natural history collection were housed in various parts of the building.

Beginning in mid-eighteenth century, a buttery occupied the southeast corner of the first floor, furnishing students with beer, alcoholic cider, and seasonal fruits. One Yale historian wrote of it:

"It was a sort of wet-nurse for those students not yet weaned from the "goodies" that they had been accustomed to receive from indulgent grandmothers and from tender parents at their homes. The place itself could not fail to have been a rendezvous for the idle and disorderly, a receptacle of gossip and noise.

The buttery closed in 1817, and Yale President Theodore Dwight Woolsey noted that "nothing became it like the leaving of it."

As a residence, South Middle gained a reputation as cramped, damp, and cold, and was considered undesirable housing by most of its occupants.

Shortly after the Atterbury restoration in 1905, Yale College Dean Frederick S. Jones announced he would move his offices there to "get to the center of the college." There they remained until World War II, when they were moved to Sterling-Sheffield-Strathcona Hall on Prospect Street and the Orr renovation fully converted the building to departmental offices and faculty meeting space.

Today, the building contains the offices of Yale's Department of Philosophy. The Faculty Room, where the Faculty of Arts and Sciences holds its meetings, is located on the second floor. There is also a computer cluster in the basement.

== Architectural significance ==
Connecticut Hall is one of the oldest buildings in Connecticut and the only remaining example of colonial-era architecture built at Yale.

It was declared a National Historic Landmark in 1965.

The University of Georgia's Old College, constructed between 1801 and 1805, is modeled on Connecticut Hall.

The first two residence halls at Miami University in Oxford, Ohio, originally dubbed "Yale of the Early West", are modeled after Connecticut Hall.

== Notable residents ==
- Horace Bushnell, theologian and Congregationalist minister
- Nathan Hale, American Revolutionary War spy
- James Hillhouse, early New Haven benefactor
- David Humphries, aide-de-camp to George Washington, ambassador and author
- James Kent, American jurist and legal scholar
- Jeremiah Mason, United States Senator
- Noah Porter, president of Yale College
- John William Sterling, lawyer and Yale benefactor
- Noah Webster, author of the first American dictionary
- Theodore Woolsey, president of Yale College
- Eli Whitney, inventor of interchangeable parts and the cotton gin

== See also ==
- List of National Historic Landmarks in Connecticut
- National Register of Historic Places listings in New Haven, Connecticut
