= A. J. Dittenhofer Warehouse =

Building in Manhattan, New York

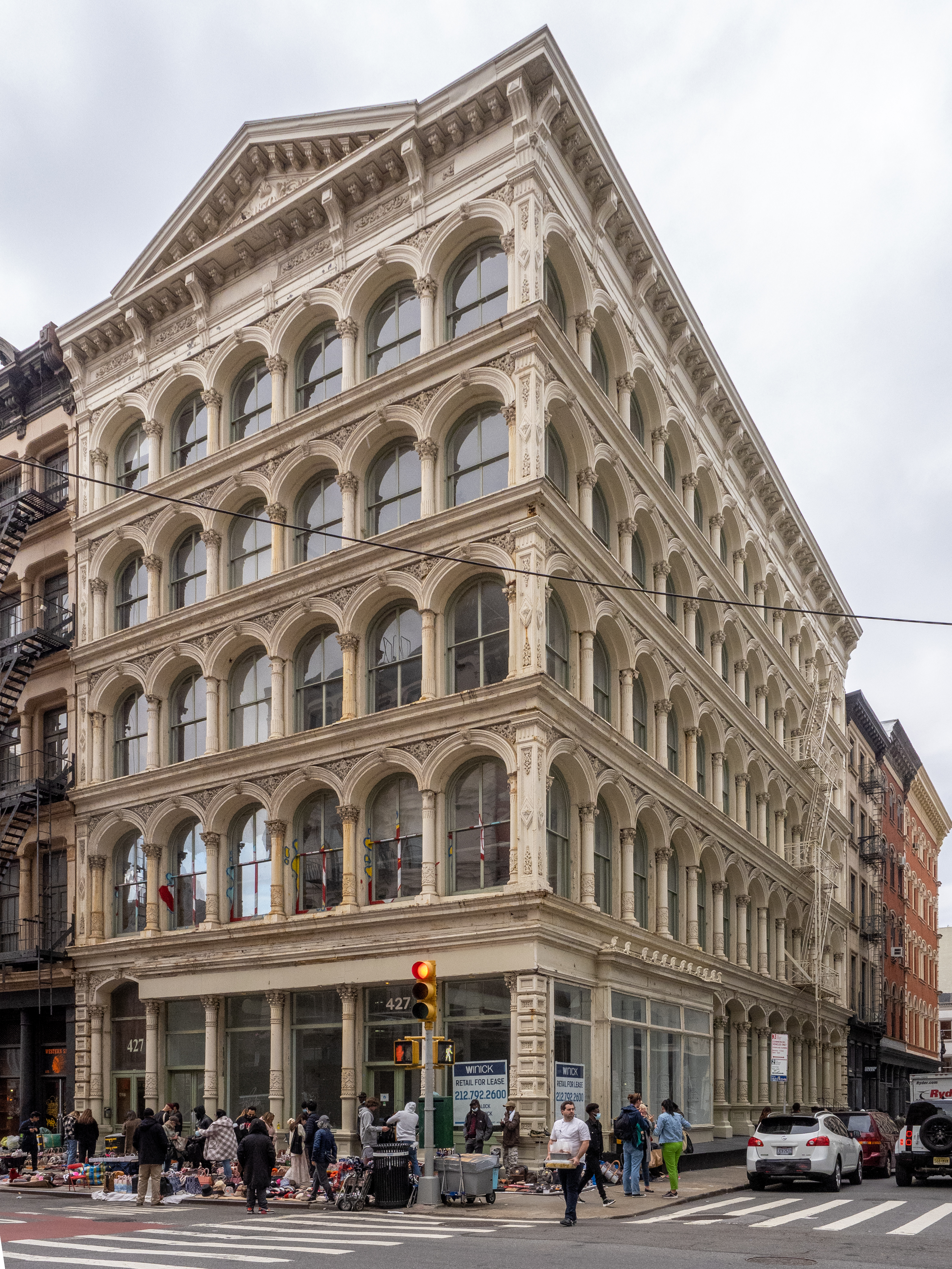
- View of the A. J. Dittenhofer Warehouse at the corner of Broadway and Howard Street

General information
- Location: 427–429 Broadway; Manhattan, New York City
- Coordinates: 40.719988°N 74.001736°W
- Construction started: 1870
- Completed: 1871

Design and construction
- Architect: Thomas R. Jackson

The A. J. Dittenhofer Warehouse is a five-story cast-iron building at 427-429 Broadway in SoHo, Manhattan, New York City. Designed by Thomas R. Jackson in 1870, the building was converted to residential lofts in 2000 by the architect Joseph Pell Lombardi.

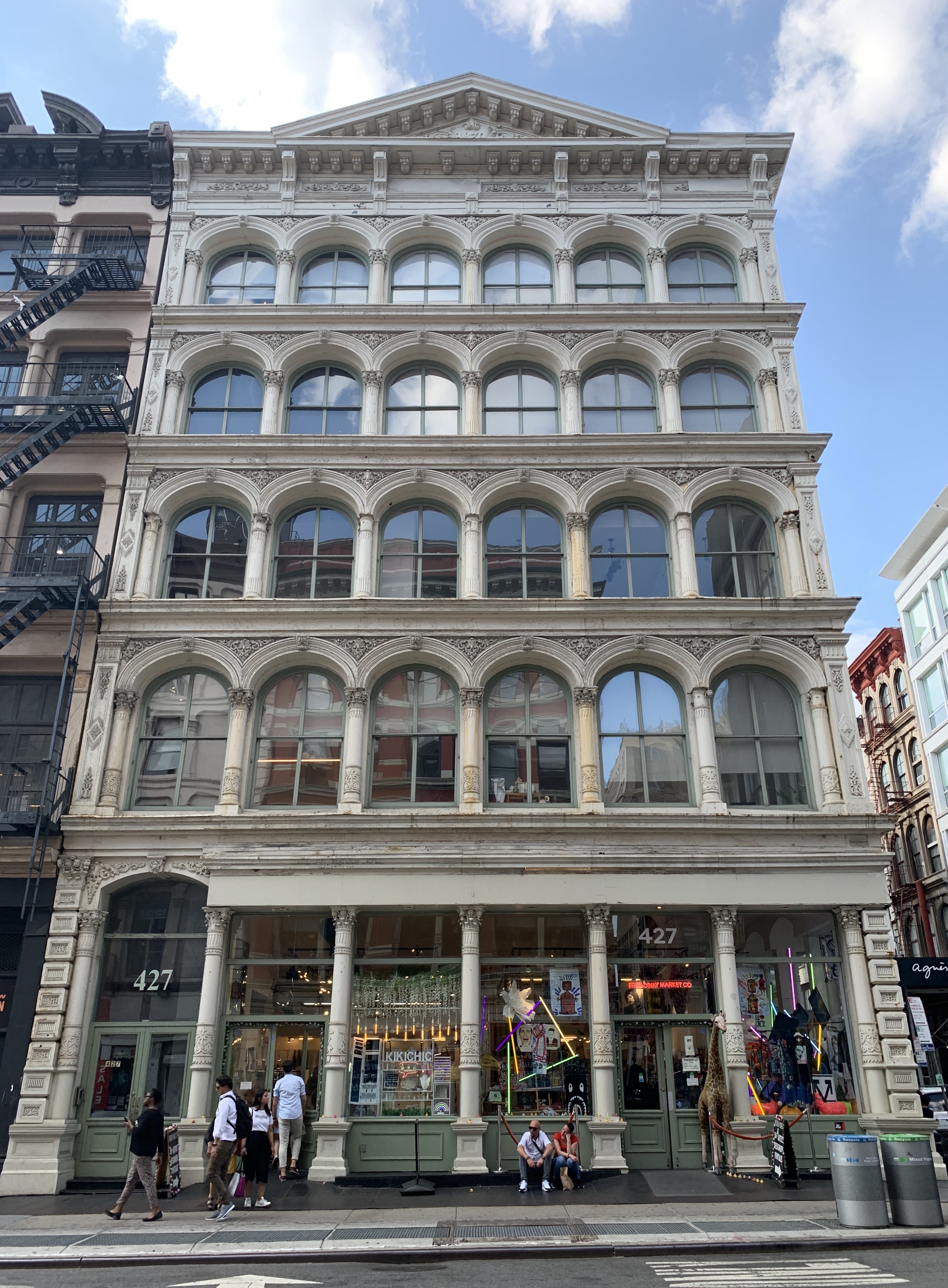

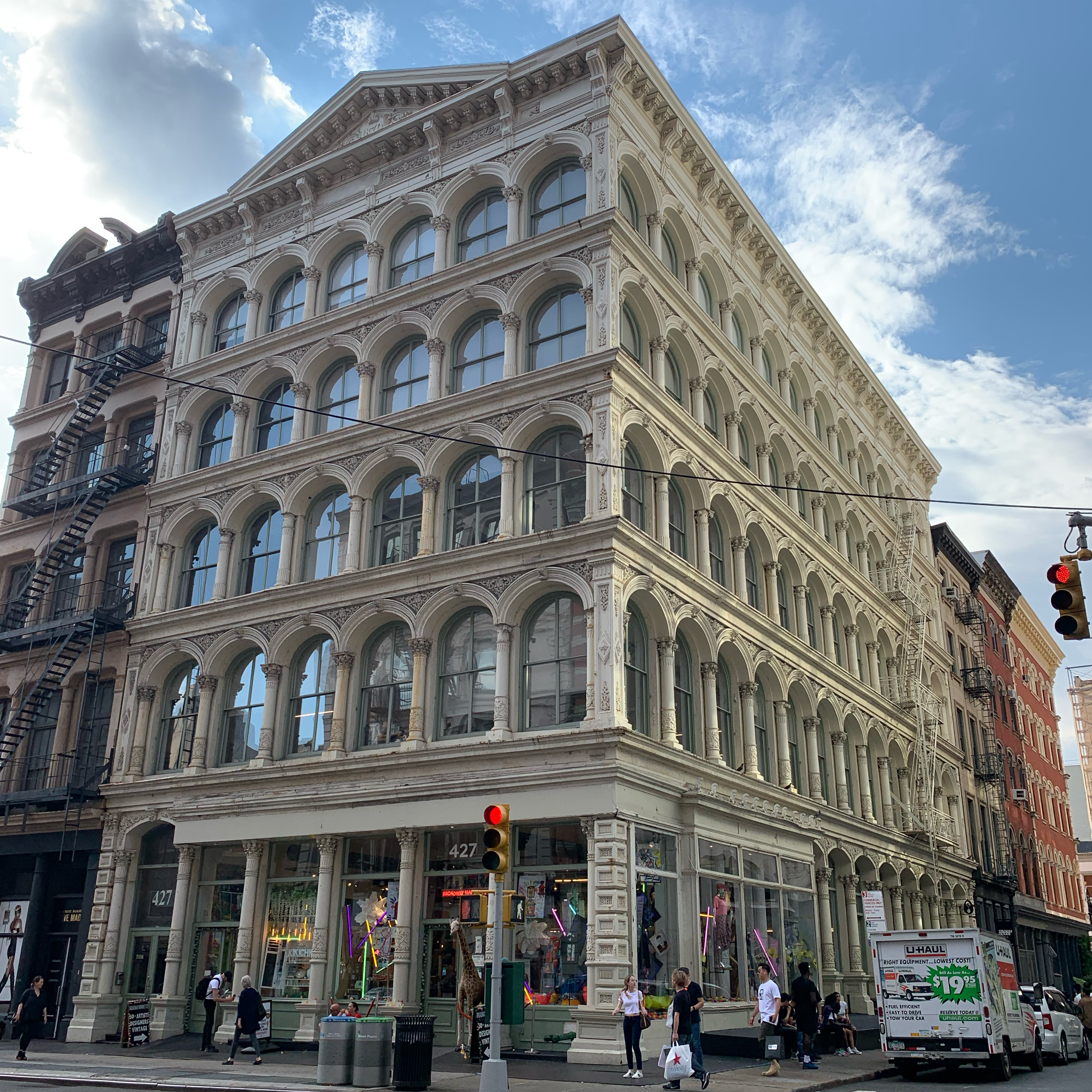

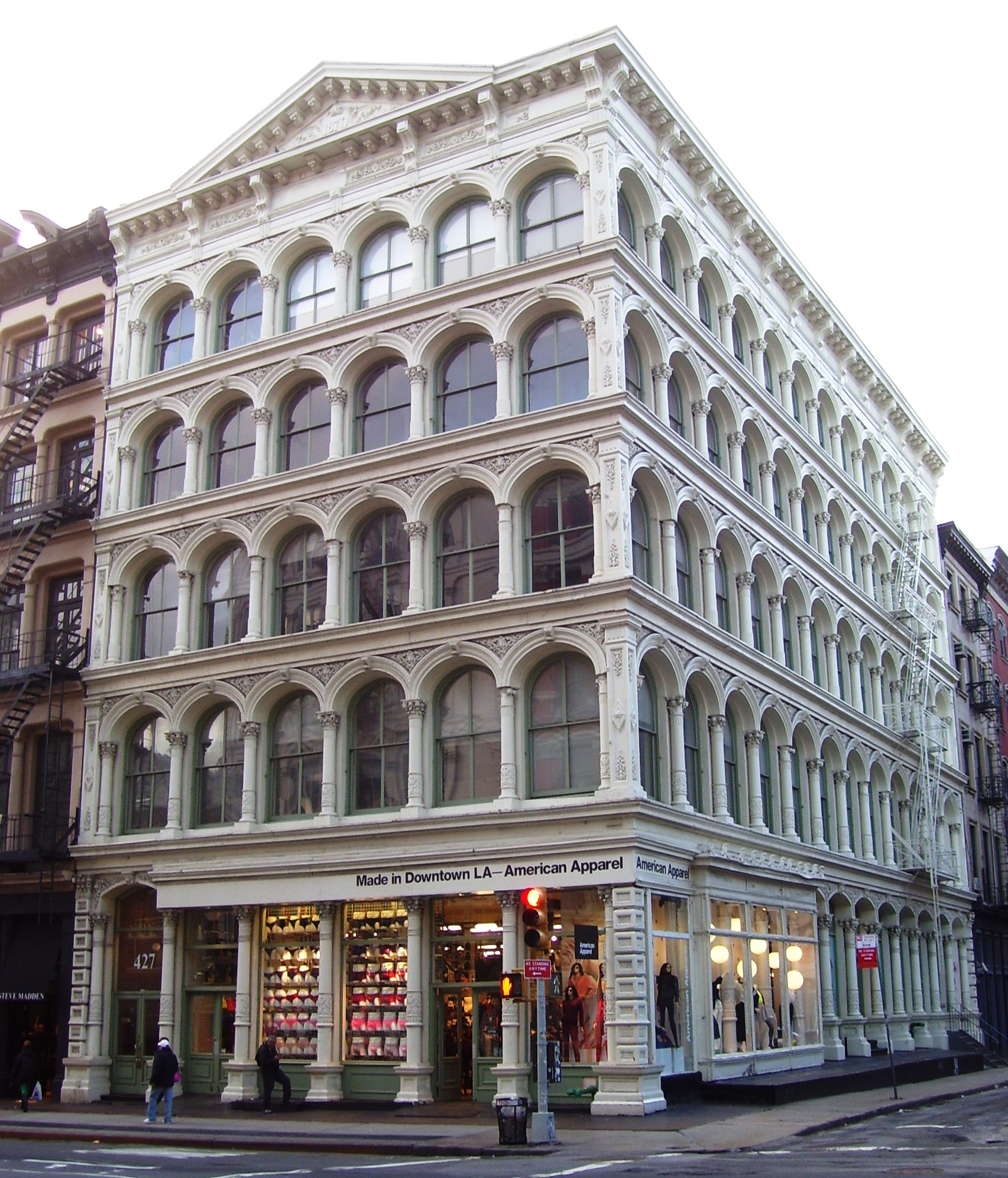
