= Old Campus =

Yale University building

Coordinates: 41.3085°N 72.9285°W

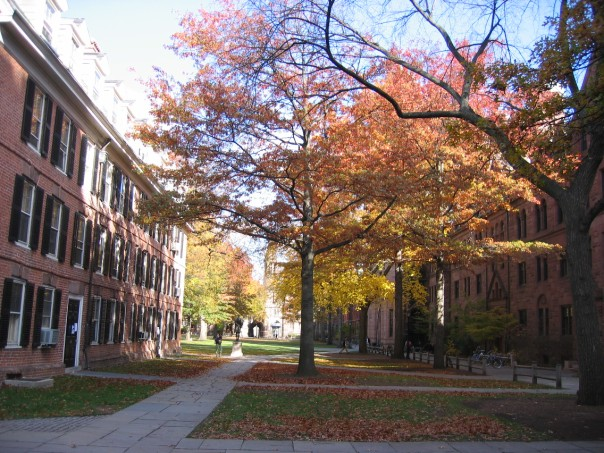
Connecticut Hall on the left and Welch Hall on the right.

The Old Campus is the oldest area of the Yale University campus in New Haven, Connecticut. It is the principal residence of Yale College first years and also contains offices for the academic departments of Classics, English, History, Comparative Literature, and Philosophy. Fourteen buildings, including eight dormitories and two chapels, surround a 4-acre (1.6 ha) courtyard with a main entrance from the New Haven Green known as Phelps Gate.

The Old Campus comprised most of Yale College's grounds between its arrival in New Haven in 1718 and its 20th-century expansion. Yale's first building in New Haven, the College House, was erected in 1718 on the Old Campus' southeast corner, fulfilling the city founders' wish to have a college near New Haven's Congregational church. It was joined by Connecticut Hall in 1750, a student dormitory and Yale's only surviving building from the colonial era. A linear building plan established in 1792, known as Old Brick Row, was the first campus plan in the United States and became a template for many American college campuses built in the 19th century. After 1870, the original plan gave way to the current quadrangle of dormitories, academic buildings, and chapels.

In addition to Connecticut Hall, the current buildings of Old Campus include most of the first year dormitories of Yale College, Street Hall of the Yale University Art Gallery, and two buildings used for religious purpose: Battell Chapel, third in a succession of college chapels, and Dwight Hall, formerly the College Library. Although the current buildings have been renovated and their uses changed during the twentieth century, all were completed before 1928.

== History ==
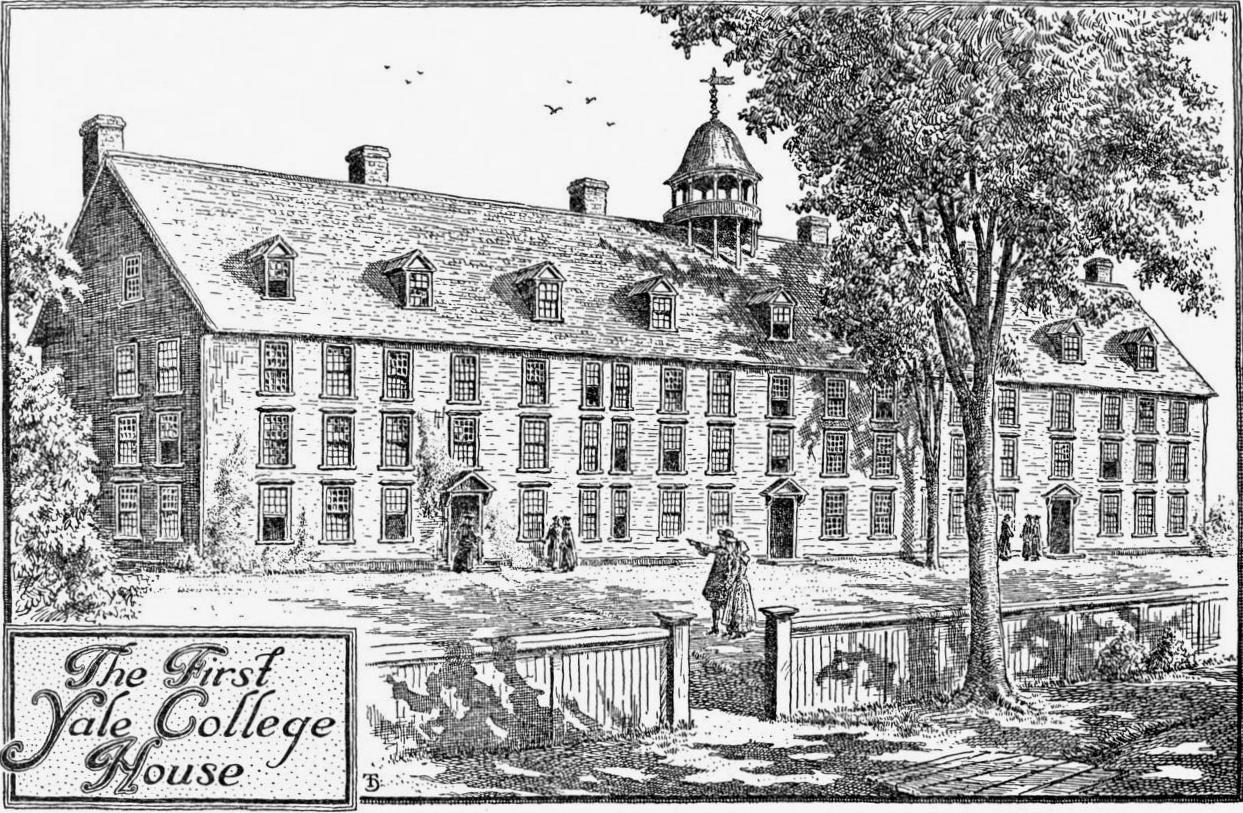
Reconstructed view of the College House, which stood from 1718 to 1782

=== First building: Yale College House ===
When Yale College moved to New Haven in 1718, the town constructed its first building, the "College House," at the corner of College and Chapel Streets, where Bingham Hall now stands. The wood-framed structure contained all the functions of the college: student rooms, a library, and a combined chapel and dining hall. Falling into disrepair, this building was torn down in stages from 1775 to 1782.

=== Old Brick Row construction ===
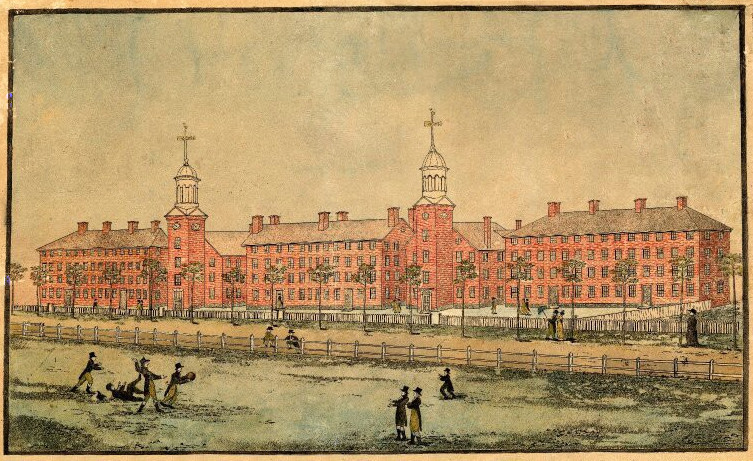
Old Brick Row in 1807, viewed from the New Haven Green. Left to right: South College, First Chapel, South Middle College, Connecticut Lyceum, and North Middle College.

Beginning in 1750 with the state-financed construction of Connecticut Hall, a student dormitory, the buildings of Old Brick Row were built over the next one hundred years. A chapel, later known as the Atheneum, joined the dormitory in 1761. During a 1792 disagreement over whether the next building should follow a linear pattern, preferred by Yale President Ezra Stiles, or right-angular pattern, preferred by the Yale Corporation and the town, Stiles commissioned James Hillhouse and John Trumbull to draft first college campus plan in the United States. Trumbull's drawings chose Stiles' linear pattern, interleaving narrow, steepled buildings between long student dormitories. By 1824, Old Brick Row included four student dormitories, then known as "colleges," and between them the Atheneum (First Chapel), Connecticut Lyceum, and Second Chapel. Around the Brick Row at this time were a chemical laboratory, a mineralogical building (the Cabinet), and the Second President's House, replacing one north of Elm Street.

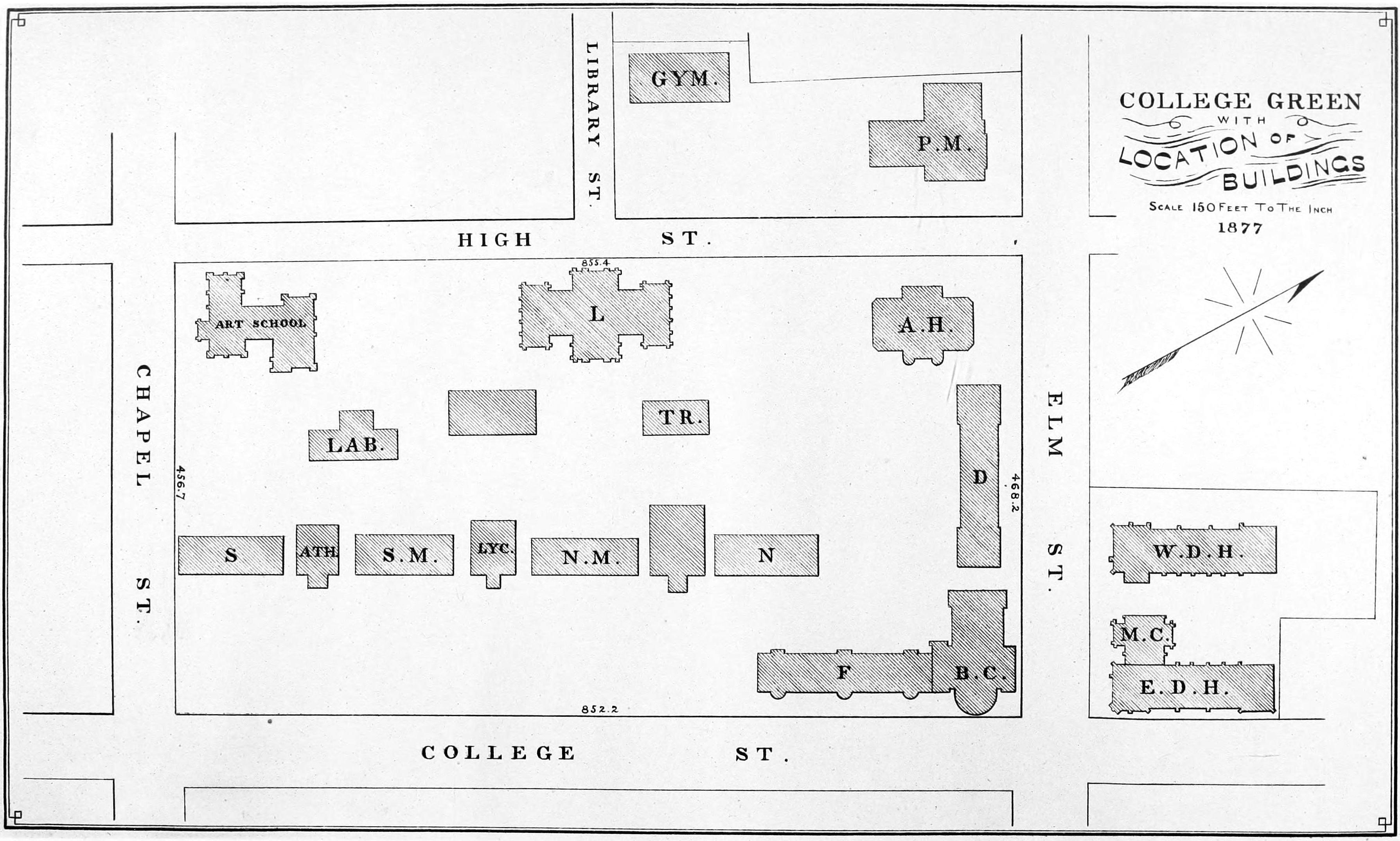
Yale College in 1879, with Old Brick Row buildings and first new dorms. Of the depicted buildings only the Art School, College Library (L.), Connecticut Hall (S.M.), Farnam (F.), Battell Chapel (B.C.) and Durfee (D.) now stand.

The college gradually purchased parcels of land until it controlled the whole block by 1857. Properties owned by Amos Doolittle and Benjamin Franklin were consolidated and demolished, as were the town jail and poorhouse. On newly acquired land surrounding Old Brick Row, administrators built the Trumbull Gallery (1832), Divinity College (1835), the College Library (1849), and Alumni Hall (1850). Of the fourteen Yale buildings completed by 1850, only two, Connecticut Hall and the College Library (now Dwight Hall), would stand fifty years later, and both survive today.

=== Quadrangle plan ===
In 1870, Yale President Noah Porter announced the "gradual abandonment and removal of the present buildings of the Brick Row," beginning with the construction of Farnam Hall. From 1870 to 1928, the college undertook a wholesale reconfiguration of its campus, tearing down the Old Brick Row and its satellites and erecting a perimeter of Victorian Gothic student dormitories around a central enclosure. Where before it had been most prestigious to live off campus, the new dormitories became fashionable as the preserve of seniors. When Yale's residential colleges were opened in 1933, the Old Campus transitioned to a home for the common First Year, with upperclassmen living in the colleges.

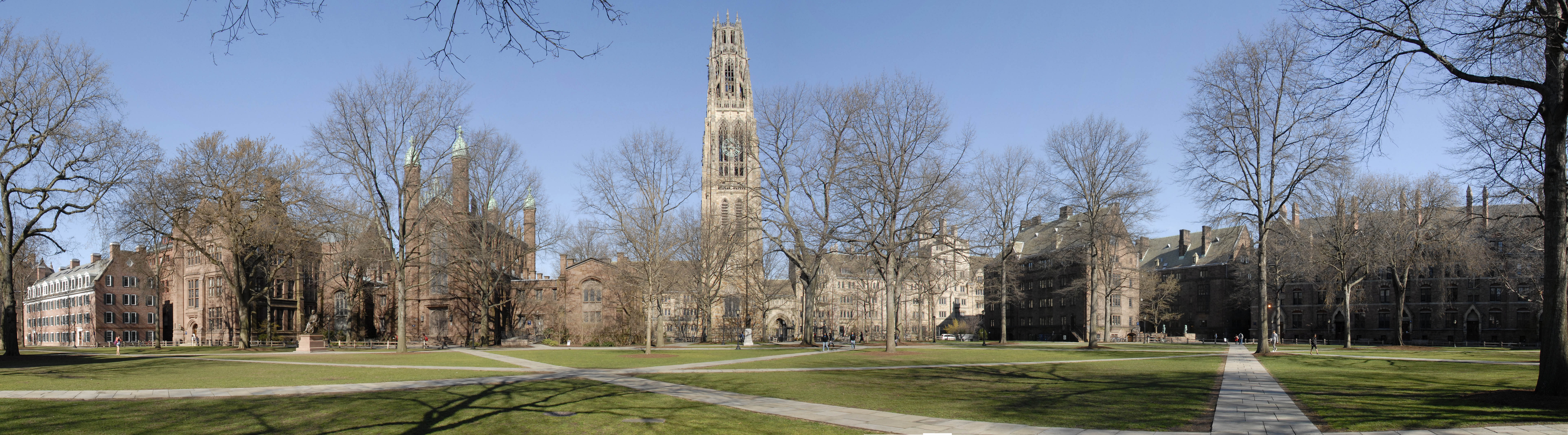
Panoramic view of McClellan Hall, Linsly-Chittenden Hall, Dwight Hall, the Memorial Quadrangle and Harkness Tower, Lanman-Wright Hall, and Durfee Hall

== Yale Fence ==
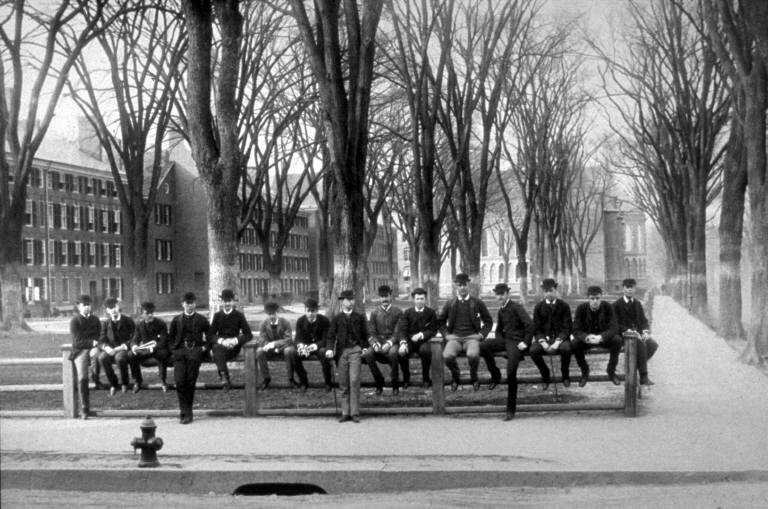
Seniors socializing on the fence around 1880

In 1833, a picket fence encircling the campus was replaced with a rail fence, causing a major shift in the social patterns of the Old Campus. The Yale Fence, a wood fence with square posts and round rails that ran three sides of Old Brick Row, was the college's primary gathering place thereafter. Students would claim sections by class year, with seniors taking choice seats along Chapel Street. However, as the modern quadrangle took form, the fence was gradually uprooted. In 1888, the displacement of its last section for Osborn Hall caused 2,100 alumni to write in protest.

The Yale Fence Club, an undergraduate fraternal organization, was named in its memory. The fence currently lining the Old Campus' interior courtyard is modeled after the old fence, and pieces of the original are held in Sterling Memorial Library.

== Student life ==
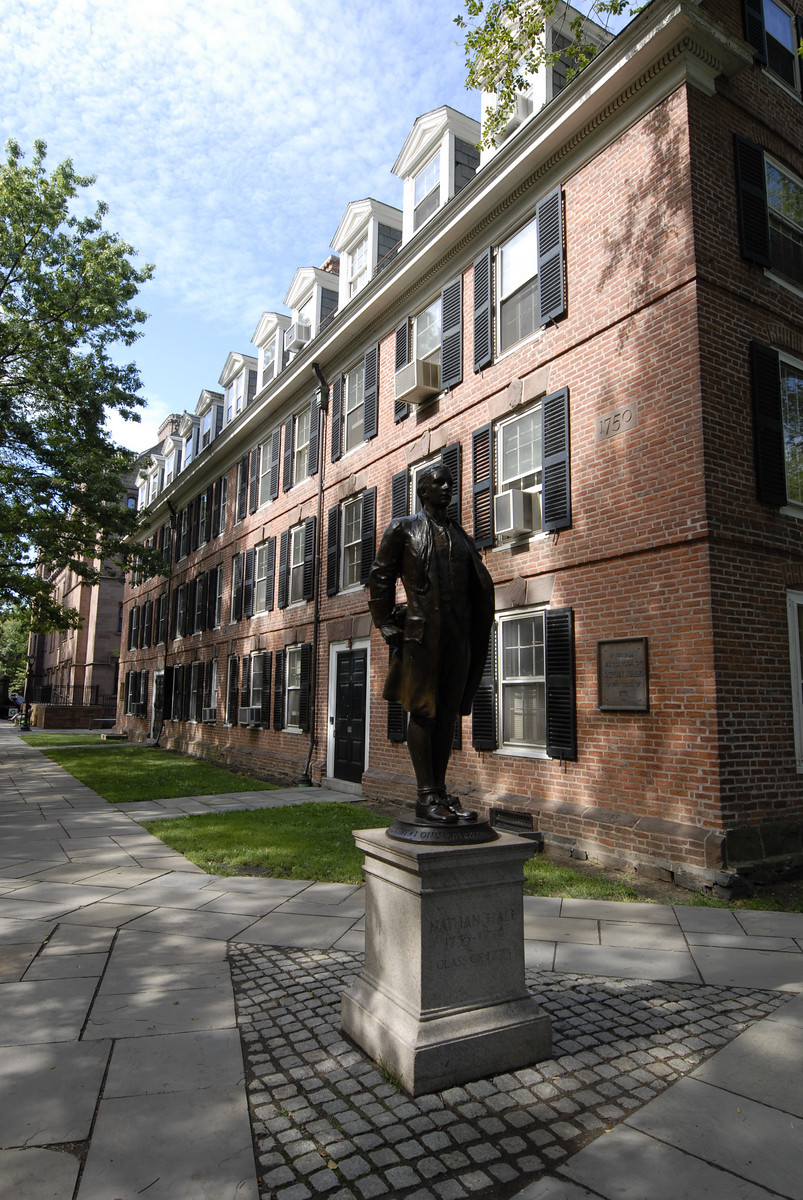
Statue of Nathan Hale in front of Connecticut Hall

Old Campus houses first years from ten of Yale College's fourteen residential colleges. These students are assigned a residential college before starting their studies at Yale, live in Old Campus dormitories during their first year, and move into their colleges at the beginning of sophomore year. Students assigned to Silliman, Timothy Dwight, Benjamin Franklin, and Pauli Murray do not live on Old Campus but rather in their colleges for all four years.

Since the 18th century, Yale's Commencement ceremony has been held on the grounds of the Old Campus. Every May, approximately 10,000 chairs are set up for the event and college's Class Day, held the day before and featuring a distinguished speaker.

During the late 19th century, the Old Campus hosted an annual Tap Night for the upperclassmen on the Old Campus, where juniors were inducted into secret societies. An echo of the event occurs with the annual fall a cappella rush, where singing groups race to first year dorms to choose new members. Old Campus hosts several curricular activities, including First Year Olympics, a competition among the residential colleges, and Spring Fling, an outdoor concert.

== Statues ==
There are bronze statues on Old Campus of Nathan Hale (1913, Bela Pratt), Theodore Dwight Woolsey (1896, John Ferguson Weir), and Abraham Pierson (1874, Launt Thompson). There are also statues of lions at the entrance to Lanman-Wright Hall. Before it was moved to Science Hill, a statue of Benjamin Silliman stood in front of Dwight Hall.

Copies of the Nathan Hale statue were cast for the Central Intelligence Agency, the U.S. Department of Justice (see Statue of Nathan Hale (New York City)), the Tribune Tower in Chicago (see Statue of Nathan Hale (Chicago)), and Fort Nathan Hale.

== Current buildings ==
Name	Photograph	Year Built	Architect	Description
Connecticut Hall		1752	Francis Letort; Thomas Bills	The oldest and only surviving member of Old Brick Row and the only colonial-era building remaining at Yale. It is nearly identical to Massachusetts Hall at Harvard, constructed thirty years before. Alongside other purposes, was used as a dormitory for 200 years until its conversion to a faculty office and classroom building in 1952 by Douglas Orr.
Dwight Hall (College Library)		1849	Henry Austin	Considered a Victorian Gothic extravagance at its opening, the building was the first dedicated library building at Yale. After collections were transferred to Sterling Memorial Library in 1930, it was converted to a chapel and community service building for Dwight Hall.
Street Hall		1866	Peter Bonnett Wight	Erected to establish the Yale School of Fine Arts, the building is now part of the Yale University Art Gallery
Farnam Hall		1870	Russell Sturgis	The first of four elongated Victorian Gothic "colleges" intended to replace Old Brick Row's colonial dormitories. Named for Henry Farnam, its construction required the removal of the Second President's House and a section of the Yale Fence. Later, Farnam's Hillhouse Avenue home became a residence for Yale presidents.
Durfee Hall		1871	Russell Sturgis	Durfee Hall was the first Yale College dormitory not situated on Old Brick Row, and was the first in the Old Campus' quadrangle arrangement.
Battell Chapel		1876	Russell Sturgis	Replacing an earlier chapel for Yale College, the chapel was dedicated as a Civil War memorial. An 1893 expansion was designed by J. Cleaveland Cady, and an apse added in 1947. Students frequented daily chapel at Battell until mandatory attendance was abolished in 1924.
Lawrence Hall		1886	Russell Sturgis	Named in memory of Thomas Garner Lawrence, Yale Class of 1884, who died in his junior year. Funded by his mother.
Chittenden Hall		1890	J. Cleaveland Cady	Yale's library collection quickly outgrew the College Library, and Chittenden was built as an annex. The stained glass window "Education" by Louis Tiffany is in the building's former reading room, now a large classroom. It was renovated and combined with Linsly Hall in 1930.
Welch Hall		1891	Bruce Price	This Victorian English Collegiate style dormitory was built of Longmeadow freestone.
Vanderbilt Hall		1894	Charles C. Haight	Considered the college's "Gold Coast" of dormitories when completed, the buildings surrounds a courtyard separate from the larger campus green. The highly prized Vanderbilt room, above the campus archway, commemorates William Henry Vanderbilt II, who died of typhoid as a Yale student.
Phelps Hall		1896	Charles C. Haight	Completed the campus' enclosure from the New Haven Green, the building was made to resemble an English gatehouse, with Phelps Gate as the new passageway into the college. Upper floors contain the Classics Department and Classics Library.
Linsly Hall		1906	Charles C. Haight	Built between Chittenden and the Old Library, Linsly was the third building needed to house the library's growing collection. It was renovated into a classroom and department building after the collections were removed in 1930 to Sterling Library.
Lanman-Wright Hall (Wright Hall)		1912	William Adams Delano	Erected on the former site of Alumni Hall, the dormitory was originally named for the first Dean of Yale College, Henry Parks Wright. The basement was designed for Yale Station, the university's post office, and housekeeping services, since moved. It was rededicated as Lanman-Wright Hall after a 1993 renovation.
McClellan Hall		1925	Walter B. Chambers	Built as a mirror image of Connecticut Hall to balance the buildings, McClellan has been a student residence since its construction. Because Connecticut Hall was believed to mar the Gothic quadrangle, its construction was kept secret until begun. Students deemed the building "Hush Hall" and protested it with the slogan "For God, for Country, and for Symmetry." It was named after Edwin McClellan of the class of 1884, not the Yale Japanologist of the same name.
Bingham Hall		1928	Walter B. Chambers	Built to replace Osborn Hall, an academic building that opened onto College and Chapel.

== Former buildings ==
Name	Photograph	In Use	Architect	Description
College House		1718–1786	Henry Caner	Yale's first building in New Haven, the College House was an all-wood structure containing the college's dormitories, dining hall, classrooms, and library. The building may have been modeled after the original Stoughten Hall at Harvard College. Located on College and Chapel Street at the current site of Bingham Hall, it was pulled down between 1775 and 1782.
Athenaeum (First Chapel)		1763–1893	Francis Letort; Thomas Bills	The last of Yale's colonial buildings in New Haven, built on the south side of Connecticut Hall. It was remodeled as a classroom and residence hall after completion of the Second Chapel in 1824. The converted building's spire was replaced with an octagonal observatory tower, containing a telescope.
Old Laboratory		1782–1888	Ira Atwater	First a dining hall, the building was renovated in 1820 into a laboratory for Benjamin Silliman, whose damp and moldy basement laboratory in the Lyceum proved challenging for chemistry experiments. In its last two years, it served as home to the Yale Co-op.
South College (Union Hall)		1794–1893	Unknown	A second dormitory to accompany Connecticut Hall, South College contained 32 student suites. The building's site along Chapel Street, selected by James Hillhouse and John Trumbull, established the building pattern of Old Brick Row. The college was demolished for Vanderbilt Hall.
Second President's House		1799–1860	Peter Banner	Built just outside the Yale Fence on College Street, the building was home to Yale's eighth and ninth presidents, Timothy Dwight and Jeremiah Day. From 1847, it served as the first home of the School of Applied Chemistry, renamed the Sheffield Scientific School and moved in 1858.
Berkeley Hall (North Middle College)		1801–1895	Peter Banner	Named to commemorate college benefactor George Berkeley. Before its construction, the site was occupied by the town jail, poorhouse, taverns, and homes.
Connecticut Lyceum		1804–1901	Peter Banner	Yale's first dedicated classroom building. Benjamin Silliman, the first scientist on the faculty, had his chemistry laboratory in the building's basement until 1820.
The Cabinet (Commons; Philosophical Building)		1819–1890	David Hoadley	Originally constructed to house Yale's new mineral collection and periodical collections. The building was later adapted into science classrooms and renamed the Philosophical Building.
North College		1820–1901	Ira Atwater	A residence hall and the northern terminus of Old Brick Row.
Second Chapel		1824–1896	Unknown	The largest-footprint building on campus at its completion, students would attend compulsory daily chapel here until the completion of Battell Chapel in 1876, when it was converted to a classroom.
Trumbull Gallery (Treasury)		1832–1901	John Trumbull	The first college-based art gallery in the nation, it first housed the collection of Revolutionary-era painter John Trumbull, as well as his crypt. When further art facilities were established at Street Hall, the building was given windows and repurposed as administrative offices.
Divinity College		1835–1869	Unknown	As theological education became disentangled from the college's curriculum, the new Theological Department was given a new home on the north end of the campus, until the opening of a Divinity School in 1870.
Alumni Hall		1850–1900	Alexander Jackson Davis	A short-lived building, the lecture hall stood on the current site of Lanman-Wright Hall. The building's towers were salvaged and affixed to Weir Hall, now part of Jonathan Edwards College
Dwight Hall		1885–1926	J. Cleaveland Cady	Built as the headquarters of the Yale Christian Association, later known as Dwight Hall, the building held recreational facilities. It was removed to improve sightlines for Harkness Tower, and the Association moved to the Old Library, re-christened Dwight Hall after its predecessor.
Osborn Hall		1888–1926	Bruce Price	The squat lecture hall opened to Chapel Street and its traffic noise, which competed with the classes inside. Replaced by the inward-facing Bingham Hall dormitory.
