= Yale Hunger and Homelessness Action Project =

- YHHAP Logo (2018)
- Abbreviation: YHHAP
- Formation: 1974
- Founder: William Sloane Coffin Jr.
- Legal status: 501(c)(3)
- Purpose: Nonprofit Organization
- Headquarters: Yale University
- Location: New Haven, CT
- Website: yhhap.org

The Yale Hunger and Homelessness Action Project (YHHAP) is a 501(c)(3) non-profit organization of university students working on housing and food security issues in New Haven, CT. Founded in 1974 by undergraduates of Yale College and then-Yale chaplain William Sloane Coffin, the organization is run by an all-student executive board and is a member of Dwight Hall. YHHAP operates a collection of volunteer projects, primarily in food rescue, shelter aid, case management, and youth mentoring. Under the national VITA program, YHHAP is one of the largest providers of free tax preparation services in Connecticut. The organization also publishes the New Haven street journal The Elm City Echo and hosts the biannual YHHAP Fast on Yale's campus. The YHHAP Fast is Yale's largest student-run fundraiser, raising $17,173 in the fall of 2022. As of 2017, YHHAP had 250 active members, making the group one of the largest at Yale. The current board is led by Arushi Dogra and Nikhe Braimah. Joanna Chen, Megan Blackwell, Tyus Sheriff, Vivian Whoriskey, Arjun Warrior, Elizabeth Schaefer, Jasmine Simmons, and Sarah Street also serve on the 2023 board.
