= Augustus Russell Street =

American philanthropist

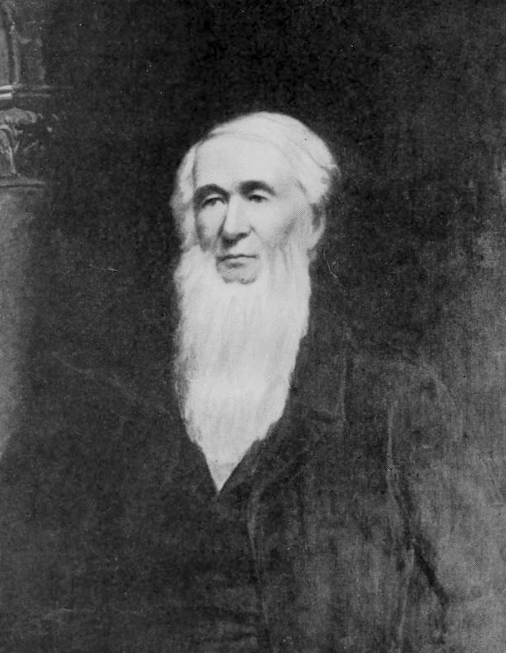
- Born: November 5, 1792; New Haven, Connecticut, US
- Died: June 12, 1866 (aged 73); New Haven, Connecticut, US
- Occupation: Philanthropist
- Spouse: Caroline Mary Leffingwell (m. 1815)
- Children: 7

Augustus Russell Street (November 5, 1792 – June 12, 1866) was a philanthropist who made significant donations to Yale University.

== Biography ==
He was born in New Haven, Connecticut, the son of Titus Street (1758-1842), the founder of Streetsboro Township, Ohio, and his wife, née Amaryllis Atwater (1764-1812). He was graduated from Yale in 1812 where he studied law, but he abandoned the profession for health reasons. He traveled in Europe from 1843 to 1848 studying art and modern languages. He inherited a fortune and used it for philanthropic endeavors.

He gave Yale its School of Fine Arts; Street Hall, named for him, was designed by Peter Bonnett Wight. He also established the Street Professorship of Modern Languages and the Titus Street Professorship in the Yale Theological department.

He married Caroline Mary Leffingwell on October 16, 1815; they had seven daughters, all of whom predeceased them. Only the eldest, Caroline Augusta Street, married and had children; her husband was Admiral Andrew Hull Foote.

Street died in New Haven on June 12, 1866.
