= Lewis Walpole Library =

Library in Farmington, Connecticut

Coordinates: 41.7157°N 72.8368°W

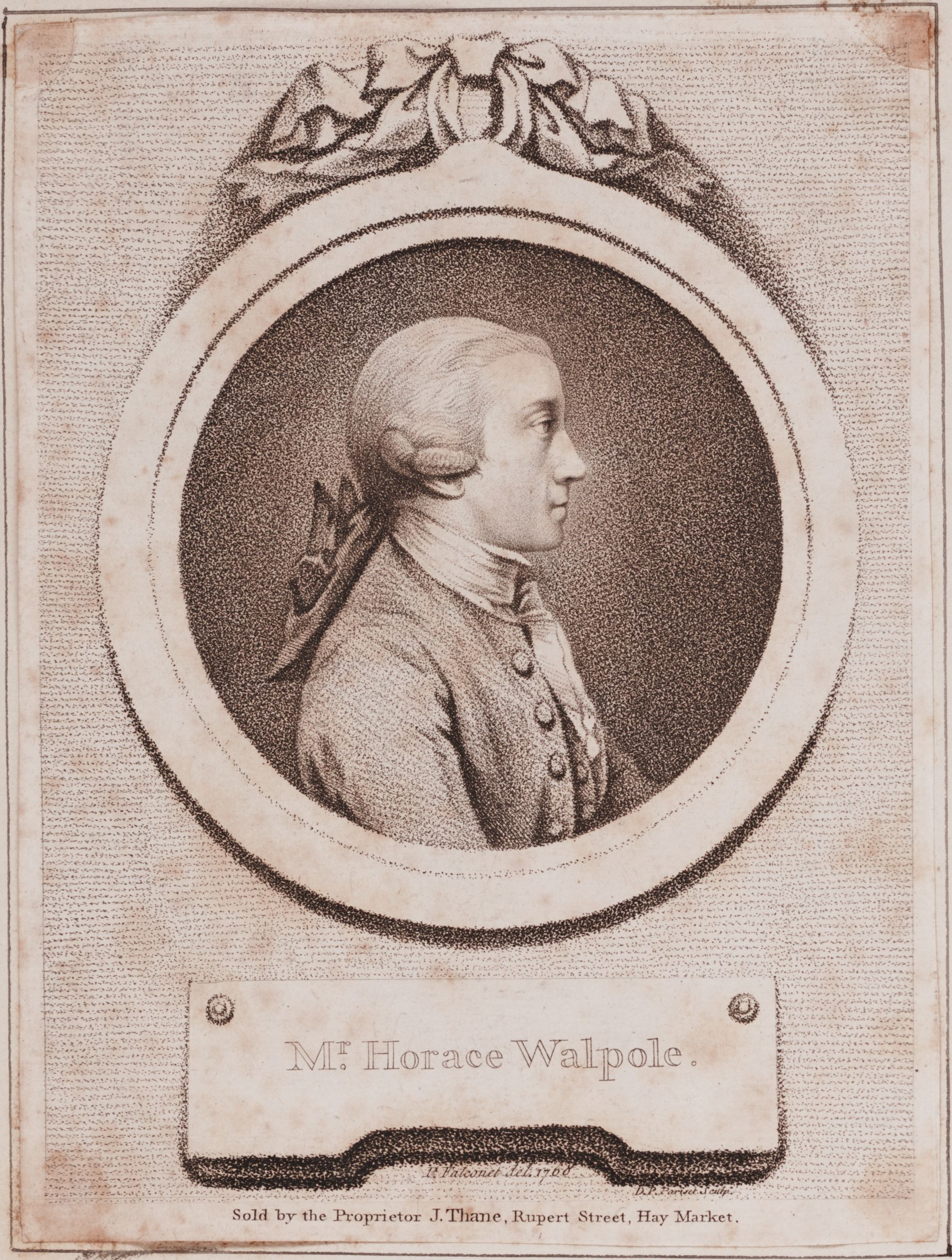
Horace Walpole, whose papers are held at the Lewis Walpole Library

The Lewis Walpole Library in Farmington, Connecticut, is part of the Yale University Library system. It holds important collections of 18th-century British literary remains, including an unrivalled quantity of Horace Walpole's papers and effects from his estate at Strawberry Hill in Twickenham in west London.

The collections include 18th-century British books, manuscripts, prints, drawings, and paintings, as well as important examples of the decorative arts. They were gathered by Wilmarth Sheldon Lewis (1895–1979, a graduate of Yale in 1918) and his wife Annie Burr Lewis (1902–1959) in a group of 18th-century buildings at Farmington. The Lewises subsequently donated the collection to Yale University, of whose Library it forms a department. Wilmarth Sheldon Lewis also left two volumes of memoirs, much of them relevant to the library: Collectors Progress (1946) and One Man's Education (1967).

The correspondence of Lewis and Alan Noel Latimer Munby is available in the library and provides insight into the bibliophile world of the 20th century.

The Library offers residential fellowships and travel grants, along with exhibitions, lectures, seminars, and colloquia.

== Publications ==
- The Age of Horace Walpole and Wilmarth Sheldon Lewis: an exhibit marking the fortieth jubilee of the Yale Edition of Horace Walpole's Correspondence and the fiftieth of the Lewis Walpole Library at Farmington [at] the College Library and the Watkinson Library, Trinity College, Hartford, Connecticut, October 29 through November 19, 1973.
- The Yale Edition of Horace Walpole’s Correspondence (48 volumes)
