= Peter Bonnett Wight =

American architect (1838–1925)

Peter Bonnett Wight FAIA
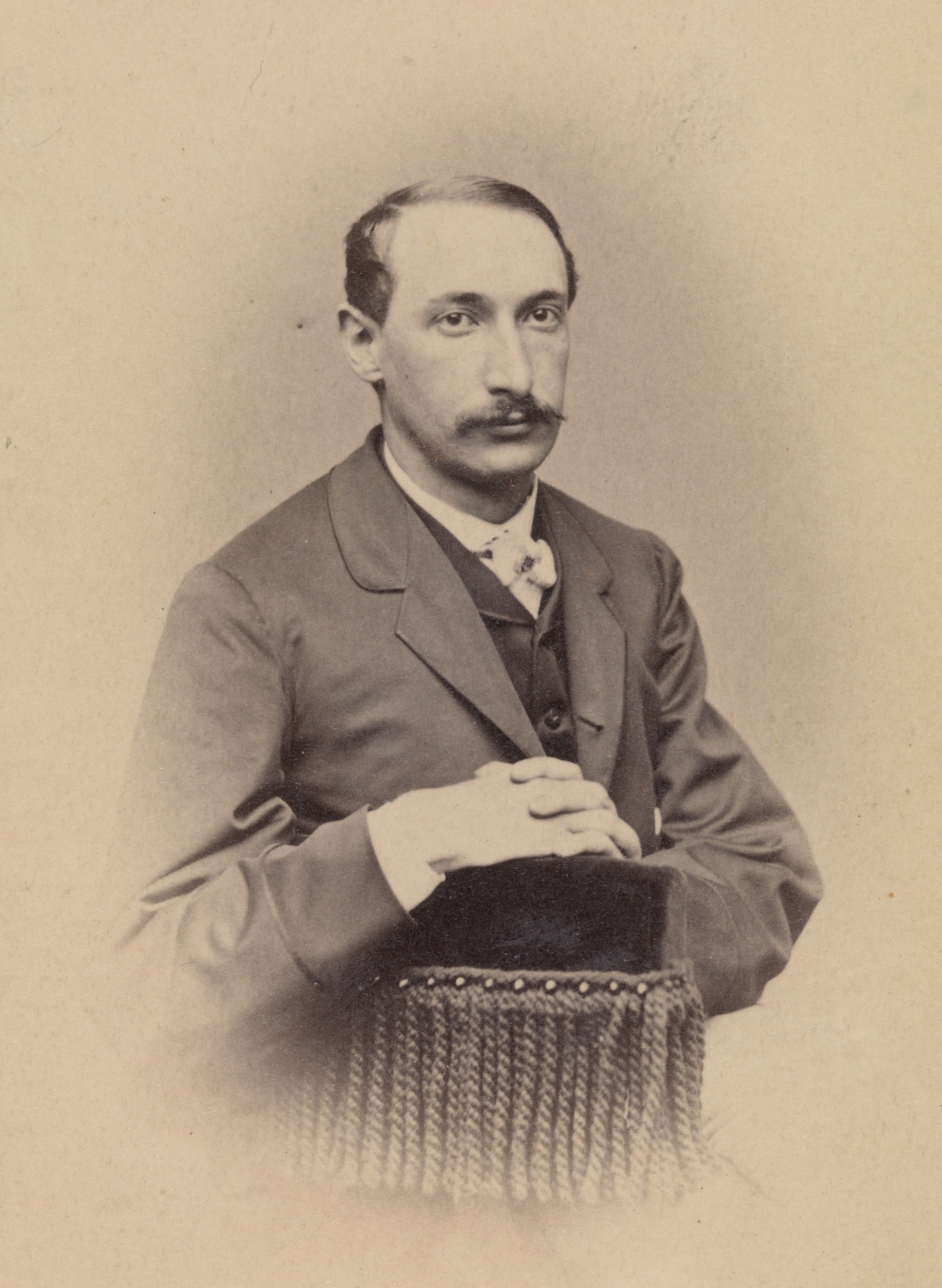
- Born: August 1, 1838; New York City, New York, U.S.
- Died: September 8, 1925 (aged 87); Pasadena, California, U.S.
- Education: Free Academy (1855)
- Occupation: Architect
- Buildings: Street Hall; New York Mercantile Library; National Academy of Design

Peter Bonnett Wight FAIA (August 1, 1838 – September 8, 1925) was an American 19th-century architect from New York City who worked there and in Chicago.

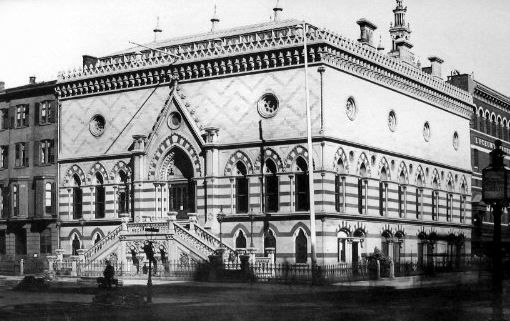
National Academy of Design

== Biography ==
Wight was born and raised in New York City (his family lived at 93 West 13th Street) and graduated in 1855 from the Free Academy (founded in 1848 and located on East 23rd Street at Lexington Avenue). He had associations with critic Russell Sturgis and was mentored by Thomas R. Jackson, through whom he came to admire the work of American architect Richard Upjohn and the writings of English social reformer and art critic John Ruskin

Wight's career "flourished in the 1860s and early 1870s in New York, where he developed a decorative, historicist style that showed affinities to the work of European designers John Ruskin and Augustus Welby Northmore Pugin." After the Chicago fire of 1871, Wight came to Chicago and developed his interest in modern technologies for fireproof construction, founding the Wight Fireproofing Co. by 1881. The firm "designed and manufactured hollow terra cotta tiles—impervious to fire and non heat-conductive—for construction."

Wight opened his own office in 1862 and produced designs for the "highly decorative and polychromatic" High Victorian Gothic National Academy of Design. In 1863, he helped establish the Society for the Advancement of Truth in Art. Following a decline in commissions in the early 1870s, he moved to Chicago where the Great Chicago Fire of 1871 had created demand for architects to help with rebuilding.

In Chicago he worked with Asher Carter and then William Drake. Wight designed commercial and residential buildings, as well as furniture and wallpaper in the Eastlake style. He retired to Pasadena, California in 1918 where he died in 1925.

Isaac G. Perry's work designing The New York State Inebriate Asylum may have been assisted by Peter Bonnett Wight (1838–1925), the head draftsman in Thomas R. Jackson's firm, but Wight's role in the project is not well documented.

Russell Sturgis was associated with Wight from 1863 to 1868 and then practiced alone until 1880. George Keller (architect) worked at his firm in New York.

Wight's design for Yale University's Street Hall incorporated both the School of the Fine Arts (the first such school on a U.S. college campus) and galleries for exhibiting art. The building's entrances from the college campus and Chapel Street reflected "the donor's wishes and symbolically uniting school and city."

== Projects ==
- Street Hall (1867), named for Augustus Russell Street, a New Haven native and Yale graduate (Class of 1812), and Peter Bonnett Wight's only building at Yale University
- Manierre Building and Lennox Building
- New York Mercantile Library (1869) Montague Street between Clinton and Court Streets, Brooklyn, New York (demolished)
- Interior of the Williamsburgh Savings Bank Building (175 Broadway)
- New York Academy of Design 23rd Street and Fourth Avenue New York City
- Grant Park design considerations (lithograph drawing with Lorado Taft and writings 1915 and 1916)
- Thomas P. Jacobs House (1867), Louisville, Kentucky in a polychromatic Gothic style

== Bibliography ==
- The Development of New Phases of the Fine Arts in 1884 America Chicago: Inland Architect Press 1884

== See also ==
- Structural clay tile
