= Dwight Hall at Yale =

Student service organization and historic building at Yale University

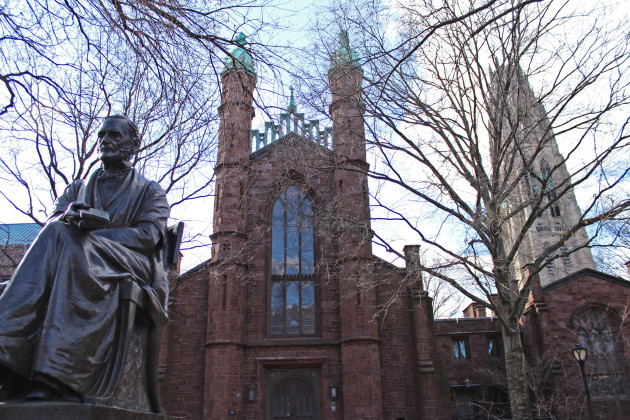
- Dwight Hall viewed from Old Campus
- Formation: 1886
- Type: 501(c)(3) nonprofit
- Tax ID no.: 06-0653140
- Purpose: Public service and social justice
- Headquarters: 67 High Street, New Haven, Connecticut, U.S.
- Location: Yale University
- Coordinates: 41.3090°N 72.9293°W
- Key people: Peter Crumlish (Executive Director)
- Budget: $3.75 million (FY 2024)
- Volunteers: 3,748
- Website: dwighthall.org

Dwight Hall at Yale, formally the Dwight Hall Center for Public Service and Social Justice, is a student-run nonprofit organization at Yale University in New Haven, Connecticut, that serves as the umbrella body for more than 80 student-led community service and social justice groups. Founded in 1886 as the campus chapter of the YMCA, the organization was incorporated in 1898 and is the oldest student-run service organization affiliated with a university in the United States. Approximately two-thirds of Yale undergraduates participate in Dwight Hall activities, contributing more than 60,000 hours of service annually to more than 20,000 community members in New Haven and beyond.

The organization is housed in Dwight Hall, a historic building on Yale's Old Campus at 67 High Street. The structure was originally built in 1842 as the Yale University Library and was designed by architect Henry Austin in the Gothic Revival style. The building was documented by the Historic American Buildings Survey (HABS CT-285) in 1964.

== Building ==
=== Yale College Library (1842–1930) ===
The building at 67 High Street was constructed between 1842 and 1846 as the Yale College Library, the university's first freestanding library building. It was designed by Henry Austin in the Gothic Revival style and featured a two-story reading room with an elaborate hammer-beam ceiling. The building served as Yale's main library until the completion of Chittenden Library in the 1890s and later Sterling Memorial Library in 1930.

=== Original Dwight Hall (1886–1926) ===
A separate building also called "Dwight Hall" was constructed on Old Campus in 1886 to house the newly formed Yale YMCA. Designed by architect J. Cleaveland Cady, it was a Victorian brownstone structure featuring a round tower with a conical roof, a lecture hall with a pipe organ, a library, and four prayer meeting rooms. The building was funded by philanthropist Frederick Marquand and Elbert B. Monroe, with the support of Yale President Noah Porter. It was dedicated on October 17, 1886.

This original Dwight Hall was demolished in 1926 to provide an unobstructed view of the newly constructed Harkness Tower, at the request of donor Anna M. Harkness. Following its demolition, the Dwight Hall organization relocated to the former Yale College Library, which was subsequently renamed Dwight Hall.

=== Conversion and renaming (1930–1931) ===
In 1930–1931, the old library building was renovated by architect Charles Z. Klauder for use by the Dwight Hall organization and the University Chaplain's Office. The conversion transformed the former library reading room into Dwight Chapel, which continues to serve as a multi-faith worship space.

=== Dwight Chapel ===
Dwight Chapel, located within the building, hosts multi-faith services including weekly Jummah prayers. The chapel houses the H. Frank Bozyan Memorial Organ, a Schlicker instrument (Opus 5756) installed in 1971 with 39 stops and 2,784 pipes. The organ is named for Hagop Frank Bozyan (1899–1965), who served as Yale's university organist and organ instructor for 45 years.

In 2015, the decorative painting in the chapel underwent conservation by EverGreene Architectural Arts.

=== 2017–2018 renovation ===
In September 2017, the building underwent its first major renovation since the 1930s conversion, at a cost of $4 million. The project was designed by Voith and Mactavish Architects and was completed in May 2018. Improvements included redesigned student meeting rooms and collaboration spaces, the installation of the building's first elevator for accessible entry, air conditioning, upgraded mechanical and infrastructure systems, and new foot-washing stations for Muslim prayer services. During the renovation, Dwight Hall operated from a temporary location at 143 Elm Street.

Yale President Peter Salovey stated at the time: "Dwight Hall is a vital part of the Yale student experience and integral to Yale's mission."

== Organization history ==
=== Founding ===
In 1879, Yale students established the Yale Christian Social Union (YCSU), inspired by the principles of the YMCA. The YCSU merged with the YMCA in 1881. The organization was further energized by the influence of evangelist Dwight L. Moody, who led summer revival meetings at Northfield, Massachusetts, attended by college men from Yale, Princeton, and other institutions. The organization was formally established in 1886 and was incorporated as an independent nonprofit in 1898.

The early Dwight Hall held weekly Sunday evening gatherings attended by 200 to 500 students, along with Bible studies, prayer meetings, and missionary activities. In 1887, Henry Drummond's lecture series at Dwight Hall drew more than 400 students per lecture. Service activities expanded from religious education to include city rescue missions, boys' clubs, and foreign missionary work, most notably the Yale-in-China program, which established schools and hospitals in China.

=== Civil rights and activism ===
During the 1960s, Dwight Hall students organized Freedom Rides, and in the 1980s the organization mobilized students against apartheid. These efforts were connected to the broader activist tradition at Yale during the chaplaincy of William Sloane Coffin (1958–1975), who organized Freedom Riders from New Haven and was a prominent civil rights and anti-war activist.

=== Secularization ===
Over the course of the 20th century, Dwight Hall evolved from a religiously affiliated Christian organization to a nonsectarian service umbrella. Today, the organization describes itself as "independent" and "nonsectarian."

== Programs ==
Dwight Hall coordinates more than 80 student-led member groups organized into four networks: the Education Network, the International Network, the Public Health Network, and the Social Justice Network. Together, these groups deploy approximately 3,748 volunteers contributing 60,788 hours of service each year to more than 20,000 community members.

=== FOCUS on New Haven ===
FOCUS on New Haven is a week-long pre-orientation program that introduces incoming first- and second-year students to the city of New Haven through community engagement activities.

=== Summer Fellowship Program ===
The Dwight Hall Summer Fellowship Program, created in 1968, provides full-time, paid placements with community partner organizations for eight to twelve weeks.

=== Yale Prison Education Initiative ===
The Yale Prison Education Initiative (YPEI) was founded in 2016 as an institutional program of Dwight Hall, offering Yale liberal arts courses to incarcerated students in Connecticut. In 2021, YPEI received a $1.5 million grant from the Andrew W. Mellon Foundation and announced a partnership with the University of New Haven to offer degrees to incarcerated students.

=== Notable member organizations ===
Member groups include the Yale Hunger and Homelessness Action Project (YHHAP), which operates a soup kitchen and case management services; Habitat for Humanity at Yale; Code Haven, which teaches coding in local schools; and Bridges ESL, which provides English language instruction.

== Governance ==
Dwight Hall is governed by a student-run Cabinet composed of leaders from each member group, which elects a Student Executive Committee (ExComm) each fall to manage day-to-day operations. The ExComm is led by two co-coordinators who present to the Board of Directors twice each semester.

A Board of Directors provides oversight. Peter Crumlish has served as Executive Director since 2013. Crumlish holds a Master of Arts in Religion from Yale Divinity School and previously served in the Peace Corps.

== COVID-19 response ==
In March 2020, Dwight Hall closed its building and transitioned operations to remote formats. During the 2020–2021 academic year, the building was converted into a COVID-19 testing site. The organization launched new initiatives during this period, including a Homework Helpline for New Haven youth, the Elm City Speaks podcast, and the Civic Allyship Initiative to redirect resources to New Haven community leaders.

== Finances ==
As of 2024, Dwight Hall reported total revenue of $3.75 million and net assets of $14 million. Revenue has grown from approximately $803,000 in fiscal year 2011 to $3.75 million in fiscal year 2024.

== See also ==
- Yale University
- Old Campus
- William Sloane Coffin
- Yale-China Association
- Yale Hunger and Homelessness Action Project
