= Thomas R. Jackson =

American architect

Thomas Reed Jackson (1826–1901) was an English-born American architect who rose to the position of head draftsman in the office of Richard Upjohn (1802–1872), one of New York's most prominent designers; in his position in Upjohn's office he was one of the designers in the construction of Trinity Church, New York. The nature of his other work with Jackson is not known. The comparatively unknown Jackson was a prolific architect in his own right.

Jackson emigrated as a child to the United States with his parents.

His five-story building constructed for the New York Times at 41 Park Row, 1851 (or 1857–1858), was the first purpose-designed structure for a New York newspaper. His Italianate Grammar School 47, East 12th Street, (1855) was one of the first American public schools designed expressly for girls.

Jackson's Brooklyn Theater, Brooklyn, was considered one of the safest, most fireproof buildings, until it burned in December 1876. His Academy of Music in Albany had burned in 1868, whereupon he was commissioned to design its replacement, the Trimble Opera House.

In 1888 plans and specifications for the buildings and the track for the Morris Park Racetrack were prepared by Jackson, personally approved in detail by John Morris, the entrepreneur of what became the most lavishly appointed racecourse in America.

Among the architects who trained in Jackson's practice was Isaac G. Perry.

== Selected further commissions ==
- St Paul's Church, Morrisania (The Bronx), 1850.
- Wallack's Theatre, 728 Broadway at 13th Street, 1861.
- A. J. Dittenhofer Warehouse, 427-429 Broadway, 1870-1871.
- Warehouse, Washington and Vestry Streets, 1882. Interior rebuilt as part of Hudson Hotel and Conference Center.
- New York Mercantile Exchange, 6 Harrison Street, 1886. Converted to condominiums.
- Castree Building, Hudson Street, New York, 1891.
- James Pyle Sons Warehouse, Washington and Charlton Streets, New York, 1895.
