= Borrow Direct =

Interlibrary loan service for some US universities

Borrow Direct is an interlibrary loan service that allows member university students, faculty, and staff with library borrowing privileges and active e-mail accounts to borrow books directly from the libraries of the other member universities. The patrons' home library bears the cost of the service and there is no charge to patrons. The service began within and slowly spread to all the members of the Ivy League, and has expanded since 2011 with the inclusion of the Massachusetts Institute of Technology (MIT) to non-Ivy (often so-called "Ivy Plus") institutions.

Patrons may request monographs, microfilm, compact discs, and digital video discs, but no other print materials (such as journals or archives) or non-print media (such as ebooks). The Borrow Direct system will not allow patrons to place requests for items that the library believes to be available for checkout locally. Items requested are normally delivered within four business days after the request is placed, with an initial loan period of six weeks, with one renewal. Items may be recalled by the owning library at any time.

== History ==
Borrow Direct went live in fall 1999 after a four-year planning and development period during which the three founding institutions, Columbia, Penn, and Yale, collaborated with the Research Libraries Group (RLG) for project management and assessment. Borrow Direct expanded to seven member libraries in 2002 with the addition of Brown, Cornell, Dartmouth, and Princeton. In 2004, Borrow Direct exceeded 100,000 transactions for the first time. Borrow Direct grew to include Harvard and MIT in 2011. The University of Chicago, Johns Hopkins University, Duke University, and Stanford University joined Borrow Direct in 2013, 2014, 2015, and 2017, respectively. Since its inception, Borrow Direct has successfully filled over 1.8 million user requests.

== Participating institutions ==
Institution	Location	First Participating Year	Library Holdings (Titles, millions) (2017)
Brown University	Providence, Rhode Island	2002	4.8
Columbia University	New York, New York	1999	9.8
Cornell University	Ithaca, New York	2002	8.0
Dartmouth College	Hanover, New Hampshire	2002	3.0
Duke University	Durham, North Carolina	2015	8.2
Harvard University	Cambridge, Massachusetts	2011	15.2
Johns Hopkins University	Baltimore, Maryland	2014	5.2
Massachusetts Institute of Technology	Cambridge, Massachusetts	2011	2.5
Princeton University	Princeton, New Jersey	2002	8.0
Stanford University	Stanford, California	2017	
University of Chicago	Chicago, Illinois	2013	7.6
University of Pennsylvania	Philadelphia, Pennsylvania	1999	6.4
Yale University	New Haven, Connecticut	1999	11.7
