= Street Hall =

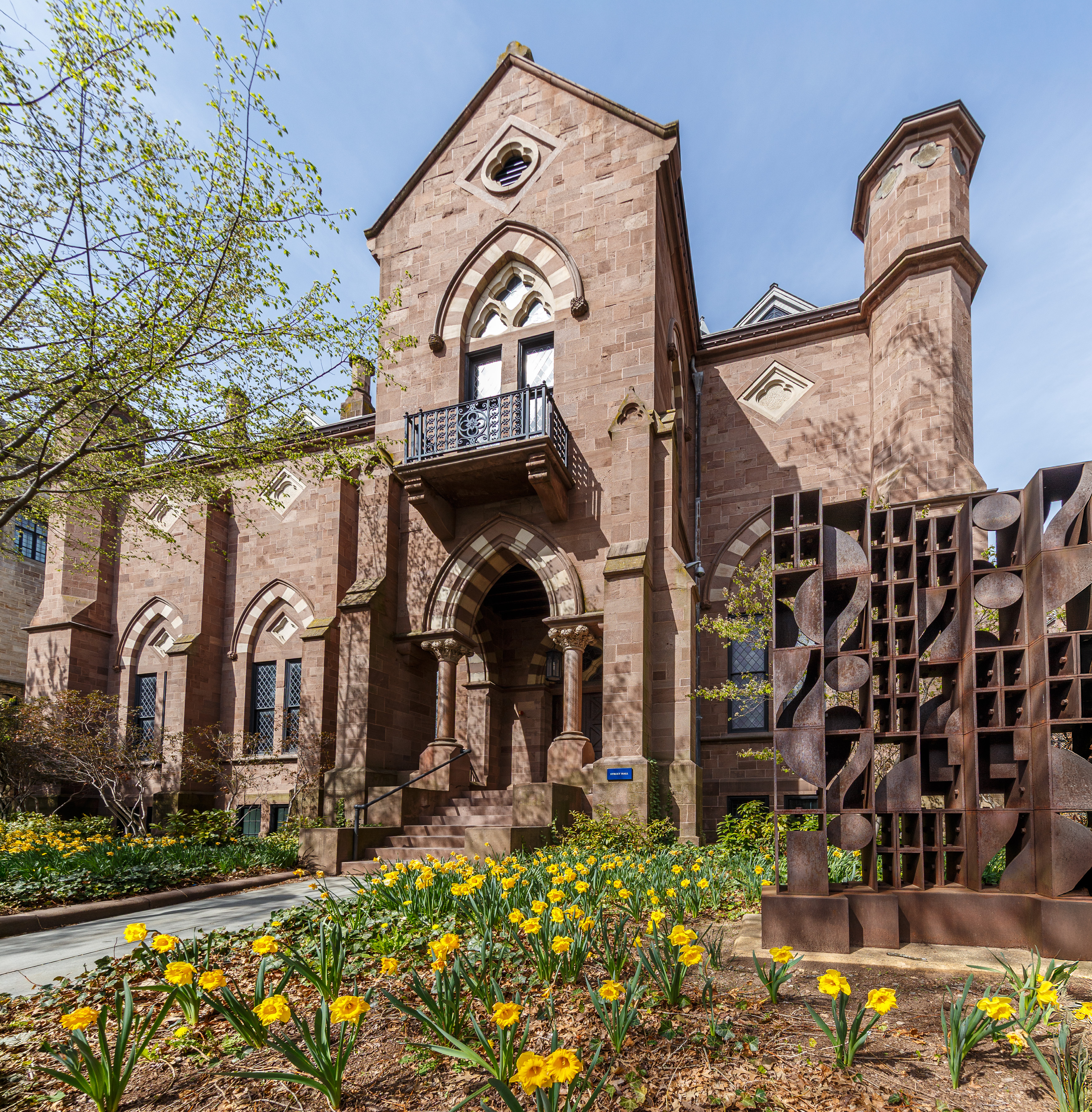
- Interactive map of the Street Hall area

General information
- Type: Lecture hall
- Location: New Haven, Connecticut, 1071 Chapel Street
- Coordinates: 41.3083°N 72.9304°W
- Completed: 1864

Design and construction
- Architect: Peter Bonnett Wight

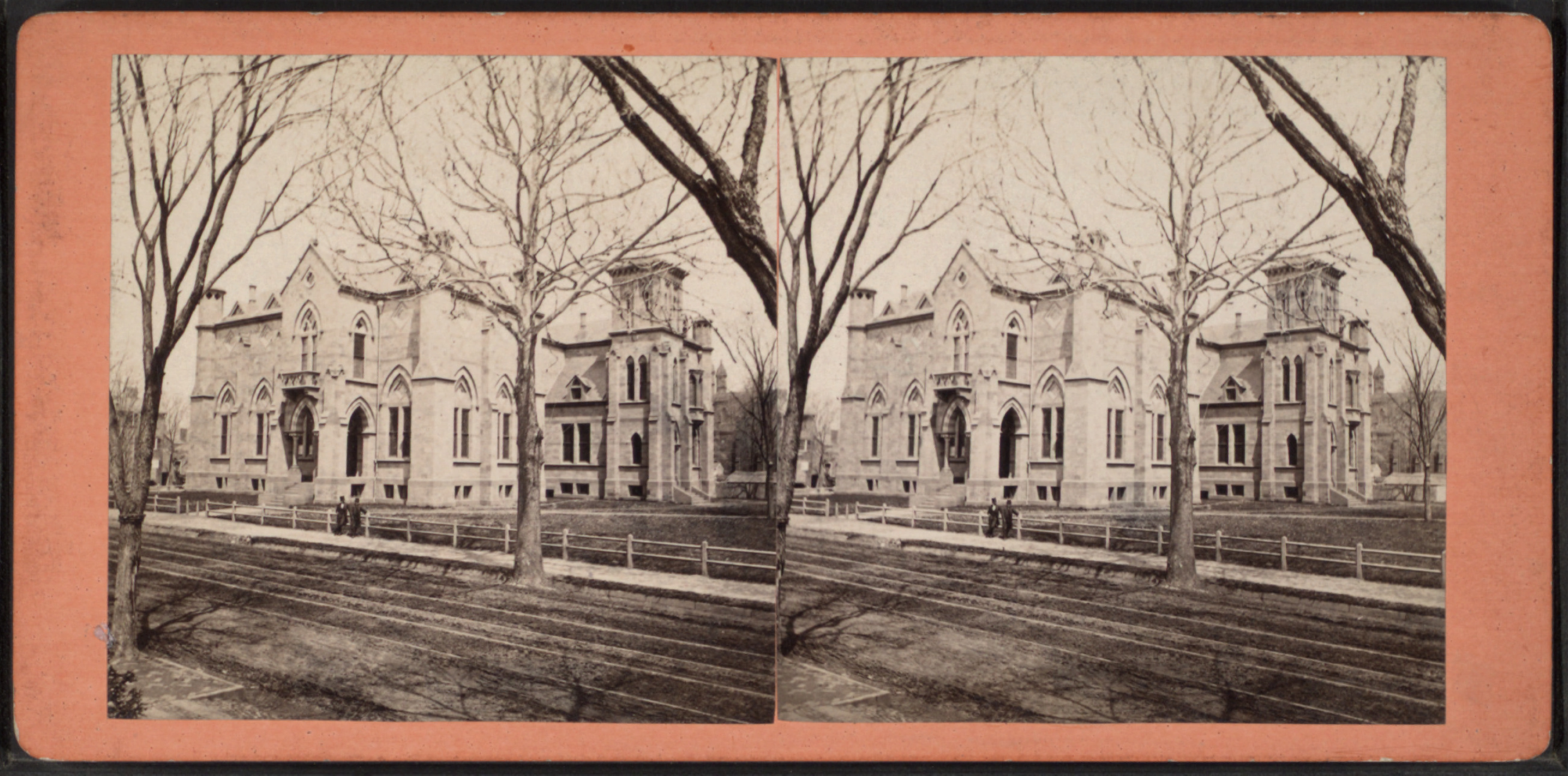
Street Hall, late 1800s

Street Hall is a historic building on Old Campus of Yale University. It housed the first collegiate art school in the United States, a gift from Augustus Russell Street, a native of New Haven and graduate of the Class of 1812, to Yale for the establishment its School of Fine Arts. It was designed by Peter Bonnett Wight in 1864.

Street Hall is described as a "beacon of Yale's then-nascent engagement with New Haven" due to Augustus Russell Street's request that the building have entrances facing both Old Campus and the city sidewalk. When the renovation is complete, visitors will be able to enter it from the Yale University Art Gallery. The Art Gallery plans to expand across the bridge over High Street into Street Hall.

The building's facade is characterized by restless, asymmetrical massing, and a combination of dark and light stones.

The building is the final resting place of John Trumbull, the famed American painter.
