= American Pre-Raphaelites =

19th-century realist painting movement

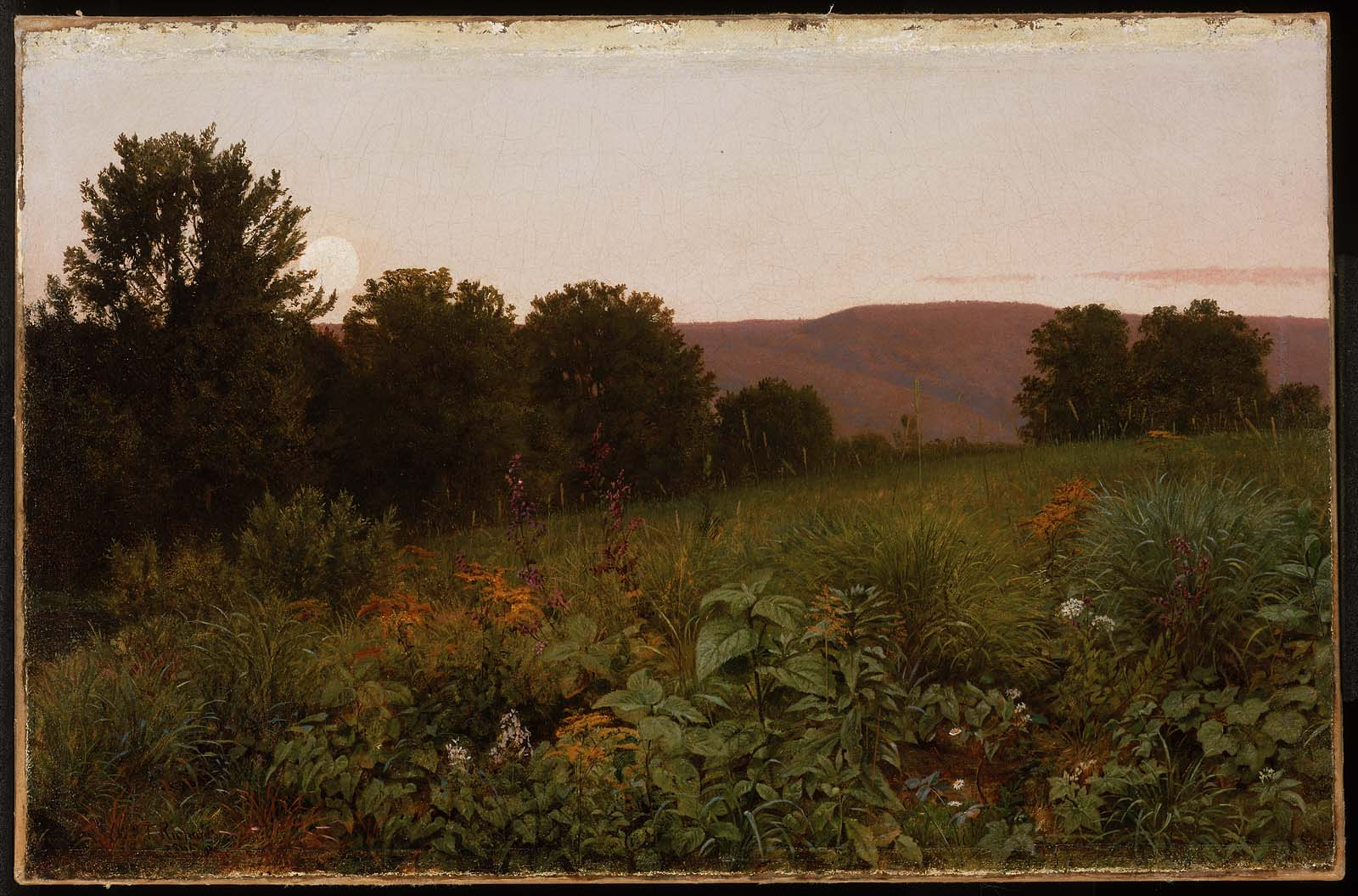
- William Trost Richards, Sunset on the Meadow, 1861, oil on canvas
- Years active: c. 1857–1867
- Location: United States
- Major figures: Thomas Charles Farrer, William James Stillman
- Influences: John Ruskin, William Henry Hunt, Dante Gabriel Rossetti, Thomas Cole

The American Pre-Raphaelites was a movement of landscape painters in the United States during the mid-19th century. It was named for its connection to the Pre-Raphaelite Brotherhood and for the influence of John Ruskin on its members. Painter Thomas Charles Farrer led the movement, and many members were active abolitionists. Their work together was short-lived, and the movement had mostly dissolved by 1870.

The American Pre-Raphaelites used a vivid, realistic style and, unlike their English counterparts, avoided figurative paintings in favor of landscapes and still lifes. American Pre-Raphaelites promoted still lifes and natural settings for paintings in the 1860s.

== History ==
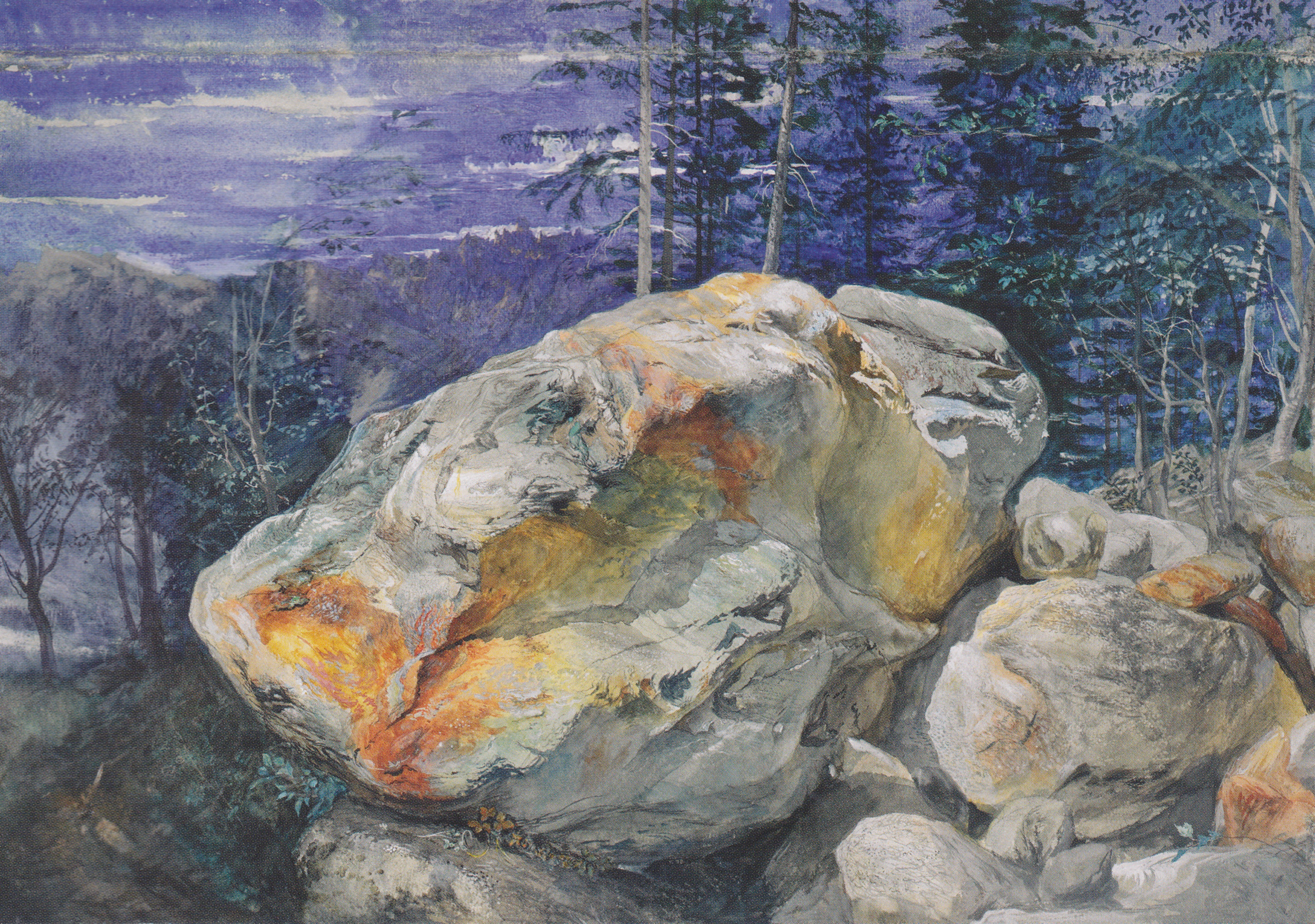
John Ruskin, Fragments of the Alps, 1854–56

The influence of English art critic John Ruskin on art in the United States began with the publication of his first volume of Modern Painters in 1843. Ruskin's emphasis on plein air painting and painting from life struck a chord with American Transcendentalist ideals. Modern Painters was read widely by painters and critics like Ralph Waldo Emerson and Charles Eliot Norton. According to artist Worthington Whittredge, Modern Painters was "in every landscape painter's hand". Small exhibition magazines like The Crayon, first published by William James Stillman in 1855, popularized the art of the Pre-Raphaelite Brotherhood.

After a trip to England, Stillman joined a group of artists who met at the Brooklyn home of Henry Kirke Brown. Together, they were referred to as "The American Pre-Raphaelites". Curated by Augustus Ruxton and William Michael Rossetti, an American exhibition of British art in New York in 1857 further spread the ideals of Pre-Raphaelite art, with works like Ruskin's own Fragments of the Alps.

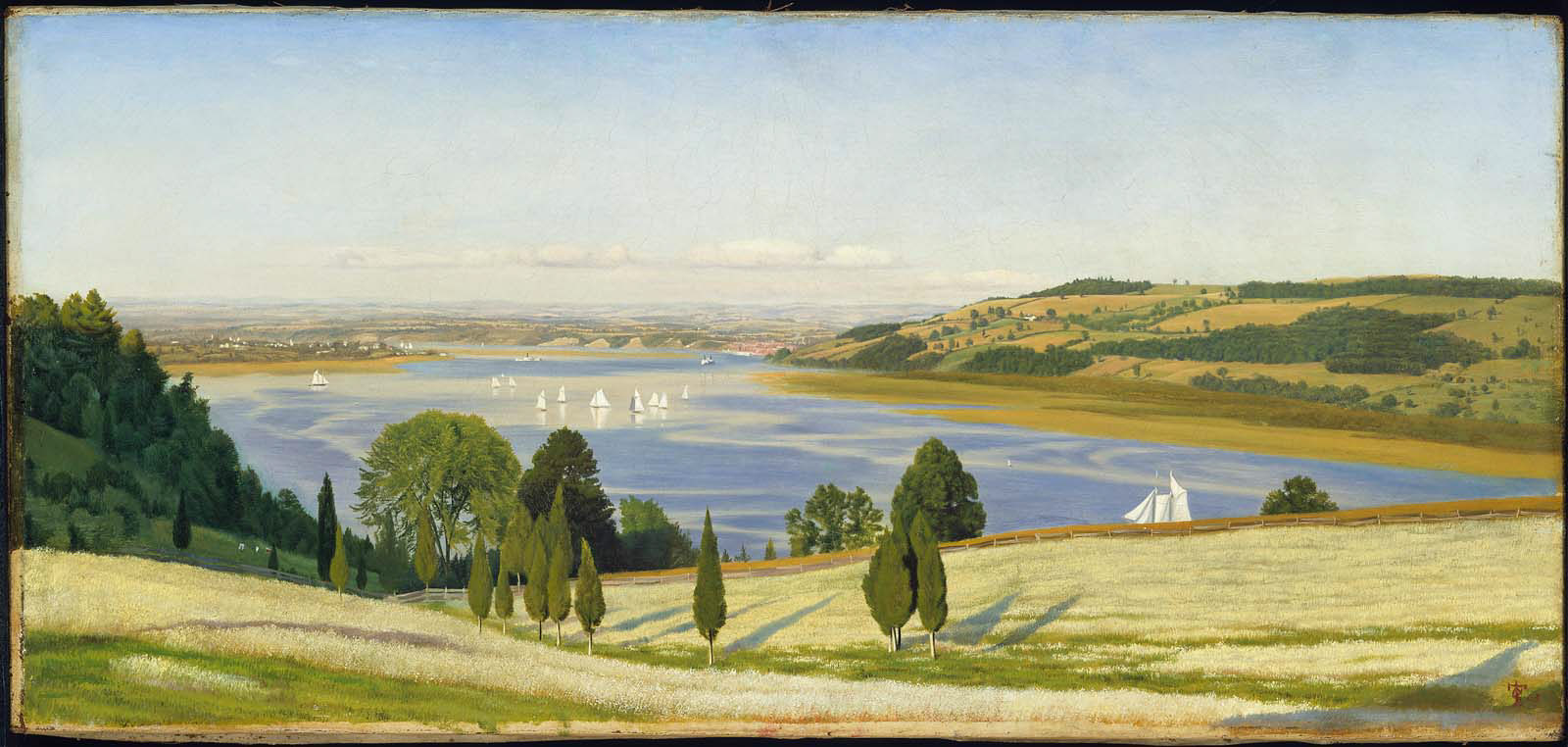
Thomas Charles Farrer, A Buckwheat Field on Thomas Cole's Farm, 1863

When the painter Thomas Charles Farrer moved to the US from England in 1860, he brought new life into the movement. Farrer had trained under Ruskin himself at the Working Men's College in London. On January 27, 1863, he and six friends formed the Association for the Advancement of Truth in Art. The Crayon had lapsed publication, so the Association began the monthly magazine, The New Path, which ran from May 1863 to December 1865.

Ranging from painting to architecture, The New Path often published essays critical of artists like Erastus Dow Palmer and generally supported the detailed, "truthful" works favored by the Pre-Raphaelites and Ruskin. Architecture and art critics Peter B. Wight and Russell Sturgis were some of the main contributors. Although many of the American Pre-Raphaelites had been members of the Hudson River School movement, they rejected its idealized landscapes. Known for its acerbic, cutting criticism, The New Path criticized painters like Albert Bierstadt for their landscapes that upheld beliefs of US manifest destiny.

After The New Path ceased publication, the movement unraveled by 1870, partially because of the upheaval of the American Civil War. The taxing demands of plein air painting also pushed many American Pre-Raphaelites to move to different styles of painting. For example, William Trost Richards became a marine painter in later life.

== Artistic style ==
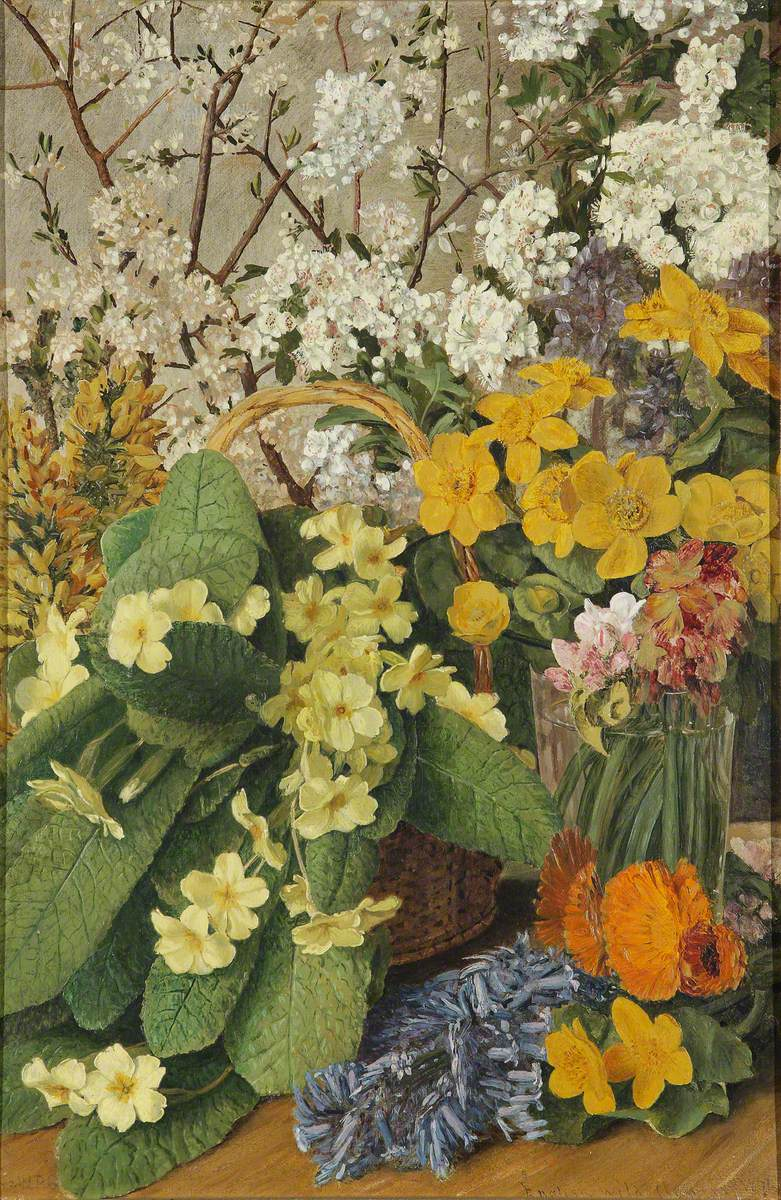
William James Stillman, English Wild Flowers, 1876

Like the English Pre-Raphaelite movement, the American Pre-Raphaelites exhibited high levels of finish and detail in their paintings, with an attention to natural representation and subjects. William Stillman reportedly once spent three months painting a violet in the foreground of one of his paintings. Similarly, the Pre-Raphaelites often criticized artists like Albert Bierstadt for not conducting enough studies before executing their paintings: they rebuked Bierstadt's The Rocky Mountains, Lander's Peak by saying, "twenty times the study that the artist has given to this picture—study represented by actual sketches, built upon a previous ten years ... would not have justified him in attempting to fill so large a canvas".

This focus sometimes led the group to be called "Realists", reflecting their opposition to academic art and the New York National Academy of Design. The overall effect is that "the world, subjected to a scientific gaze, is made to disclose a surfeit of detail, turning nature into ornament", according to critic Bailey Trela. As time passed, the American Pre-Raphaelites were criticized as "unimaginative" and for adhering too closely to Ruskin's refutation of emotive art, which uses what he called the pathetic fallacy.

While they had adopted the naturalist emphasis of English Pre-Raphaelitism, they did not use the moral scenes or medieval settings in their own works. The American artists often depicted "rustic, informal" landscapes and still lifes, and had a predilection for painting birds' nests.

== List of artists and writers ==
- Mary Louise Booth
- Henry Kirke Brown
- Fidelia Bridges
- Clarence Cook
- Henry Farrer
- Thomas Charles Farrer
- John William Hill
- Clarence King
- Charles Herbert Moore
- Henry Roderick Newman
- William Trost Richards
- William James Stillman
- Russell Sturgis
- Sarah Tuthill
- Peter Bonnett Wight
