= Henry Roderick Newman =

American painter

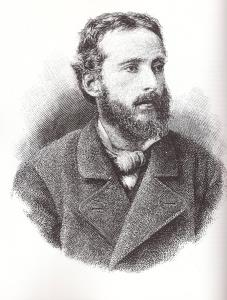
Henry Roderick Newman (1883)

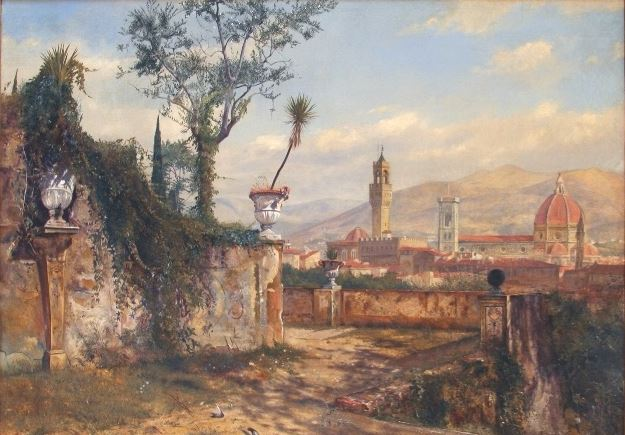
View of Florence, oil on canvas, 1877

Henry Roderick Newman (March 4, 1843 Easton, New York - December 1, 1917, Florence, Italy) was an American landscape and still-life painter, influenced by the Pre-Raphaelite style.

== Biography ==
In 1853, his family moved to New York City. Around 1860 he began studying to become a doctor, like his father but, in his spare time, taught himself to paint.

When his father died, in 1861, he gave up medicine and, at the age of eighteen, declared his intention to become a painter. His mother, naturally displeased, gave him one year to prove that he could support himself that way. In response, he spent six months painting landscapes in Stockbridge, Massachusetts, after which he sent three paintings to the National Academy of Design. From 1864, he was a member of the American, Pre-Raphaelite-inspired, Association for the Advancement of the Cause of Truth in Art.

In 1868, he was attracted to Florida for health reasons and became one of the first well-known American painters to work there, near St. Augustine. In spring 1870 he went to France, where he briefly studied with Jean-Léon Gérôme, but was dissatisfied with his methods. Shortly after the outbreak of the Franco-Prussian War, he moved to Italy, where he lived for the rest of his life.

There, he focused on architectural scenes and floral studies. In 1877, English critic John Ruskin saw his work and suggested subjects for him to paint, some of which he commissioned. Newman was married in 1883 to Englishwoman Mary Watson Willis.

Beginning in 1887 he began spending winters in Egypt, remaining there several months every year. He returned to Egypt nearly every winter for the rest of his life. Most of the works he created on those visits are watercolors of ancient structures, especially of the Temple of Philae, rather than the usual Orientalist scenes. In 1896-1897 he visited Japan, where he did a group of architectural and landscape views.
