= Henry Farrer =

British-American painter

- Born: Henry Farrer; 23 March 1844; London, England, UK
- Died: 24 February 1903 (aged 58)
- Education: Self-taught
- Known for: Watercolor painting, etching
- Movement: Tonalism

Henry Farrer (March 23, 1844 – February 24, 1903) was an English-born American artist known for his tonalist watercolor landscapes and etchings.

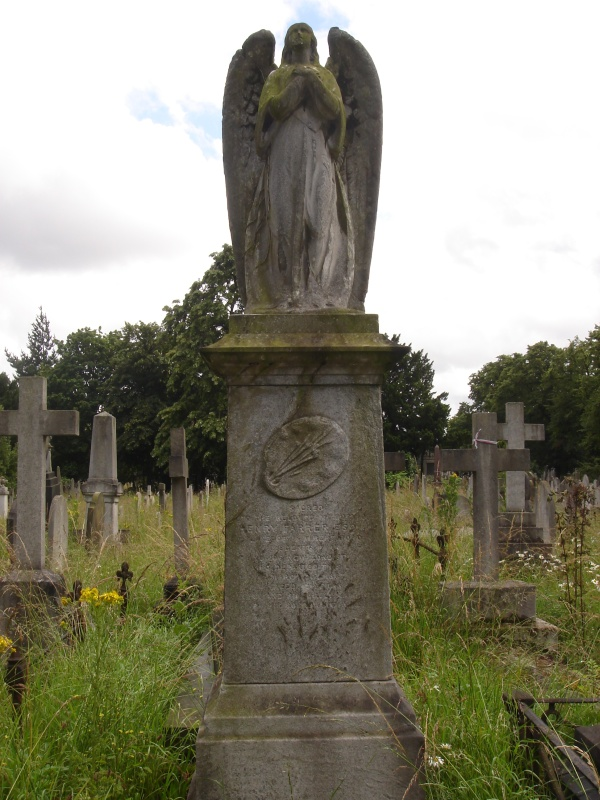
Funerary monument of Henry Farrer in Brompton Cemetery, London

== Life ==
Farrer was born in London, the younger brother of artist Thomas Charles Farrer. Thomas had studied in Britain under John Ruskin and Dante Gabriel Rossetti, members of the Pre-Raphaelite Brotherhood. Henry was self-taught, and may have aligned his style with that of his older brother.

Farrer immigrated to America in 1863 and opened a studio in New York. As a newcomer to the American art world, he became a member of the Society for the Advancement of Truth in Art, a short-lived organization co-founded by his brother and centered on the Pre-Raphaelite tradition of truthful and highly realistic artistic depictions. In his first years as a professional artist in the 1860s, Farrer painted Pre-Raphaelite still lives, some landscapes and marine works, and also began his first efforts at etching.

In the 1870s, Farrer's landscape work shifted to the tonalist style for which he is best remembered. He co-founded the American Watercolor Society and, unlike most artists of the time, painted in water colours almost exclusively. His tonalist landscapes, which he continued to create into the 1890s, typically depict a misty or cloudy landscape with a marsh or small pond in the foreground. The sun is often setting in a Farrer painting, and the overall feeling one of stillness. His use of subdued, earthy colors gives his works a meditative mood.

During the same period, Farrer became a driving force in the Etching Revival in America. He was a founding member of the New York Etching Club in 1877, and active in the promotion of etching as a creative medium rather than a reproductive one. Farrer's best known etchings depict New York. He etched a series of street scenes in the 1860s, and another series of New York Harbor scenes in the late 1870s and 1880s.

Farrer is buried in Brompton Cemetery, London.
