= John William Hill =

British-American painter (1812–1879)

- Brown thrasher and American robin
- Born: January 13, 1812; London
- Died: September 24, 1879 (aged 67); West Nyack, NY
- Education: National Academy of Design
- Known for: Landscape art, Painting
- Movement: Society for the Advancement of Truth in Art

John William Hill or often J.W. Hill (January 13, 1812 – September 24, 1879) was a British-born American artist working in watercolor, gouache, lithography, and engraving. Hill's work focused primarily upon natural subjects including landscapes, still lifes, and ornithological and zoological subjects. In the 1850s, influenced by John Ruskin and Hill's association with American followers of the Pre-Raphaelite Brotherhood, his attention turned from technical illustration toward still life and landscape.

== Life ==
Born in London, Hill was the son of British aquatint engraver John Hill. He emigrated with his parents from London to the United States in 1819, initially living in Philadelphia. In 1822 the family moved to New York, where Hill apprenticed in aquatint engraving in his father's shop.

In 1838 Hill married Catherine Smith. Their children included the astronomer George William Hill and the painter John Henry Hill.

He died in West Nyack, New York.

== Work ==
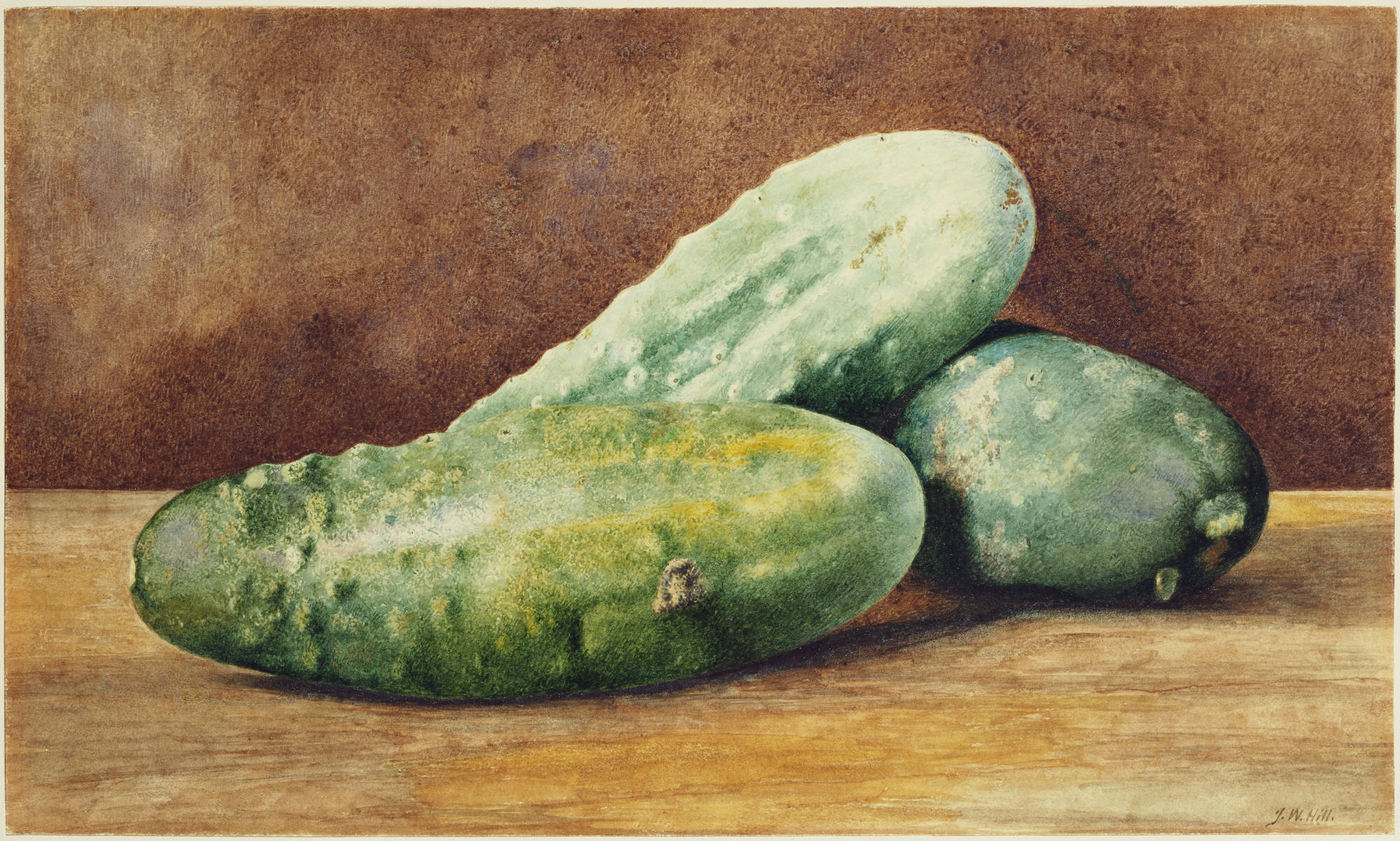
Cucumbers, c. 1860, Princeton University Art Museum

In watercolor and aquatint engravings, Hill employed a stipple technique, building up planes of softly graduated colors made of tiny brushstrokes–a process commonly seen in painted miniatures. Applied to a larger scale on canvas the result was a form of objective realism in contrast with more common romanticized works of mid-19th century American painting. In 1829, at the age of 17, Hill began exhibiting watercolors and engravings produced in his father's studio at the Brooklyn Art Association and the National Academy of Design. In 1833, at the age of 21, Hill was elected to associate membership in the National Academy of Design.

In his early twenties Hill began work for the New York State Geological Survey, first creating a series of topographic studies and overhead views of principal American cities and towns. This work was distinct for its accuracy of aerial perspective and recording minute architectural detail. These portraits of urban settlement required frequent travel to observe, sketch, and map before creating finished watercolor studies. The completed watercolors were then recreated as color lithographic art and published by the Smith Brothers, a New York City publisher.

Hill's work with the New York State Geological Survey continued later with his illustration of James Ellsworth De Kay's Zoology of New York State, or; The New-York Fauna. Part II, Birds published in 1844. Like John James Audubon's bird portraits, Hill's were painted with an objective eye, documenting accurate anatomy and colors, and capturing the animal's natural countenance.

While in his early forties Hill read John Ruskin's Modern Painters, and became fascinated with the Pre-Raphaelite Brotherhood. The Pre-Raphaelite movement's combination of realism with increased emotional content appealed to Hill. Hill championed Pre-Raphaelite painting methods in the United States, but was less fascinated with their ideals. In 1863, with art critic Clarence Cook, geologist Clarence King, and architect Russell Sturgis, Hill helped to found the Society for the Advancement of Truth in Art. For the remainder of Hill's life he produced landscapes, mostly of the mountainous areas of New England and New York state. Hill's paintings and engravings are found in the collections of the Brooklyn Museum, the Amon Carter Museum, Fogg Museum, the Hood Museum of Art, the National Gallery of Art, the Hudson River Museum, and the Metropolitan Museum of Art.
