= James Ellsworth De Kay =

American zoologist

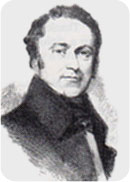
- Born: October 12, 1792; Lisbon, Portugal
- Died: November 21, 1851 (aged 59); Oyster Bay, New York, US
- Education: University of Edinburgh
- Notable work: Zoology of New York, or The New-York Fauna
- Scientific career
- Fields: zoology

James Ellsworth De Kay (alternatively spelled DeKay or Dekay) (October 12, 1792 – November 21, 1851) was an American zoologist.

== Biography ==
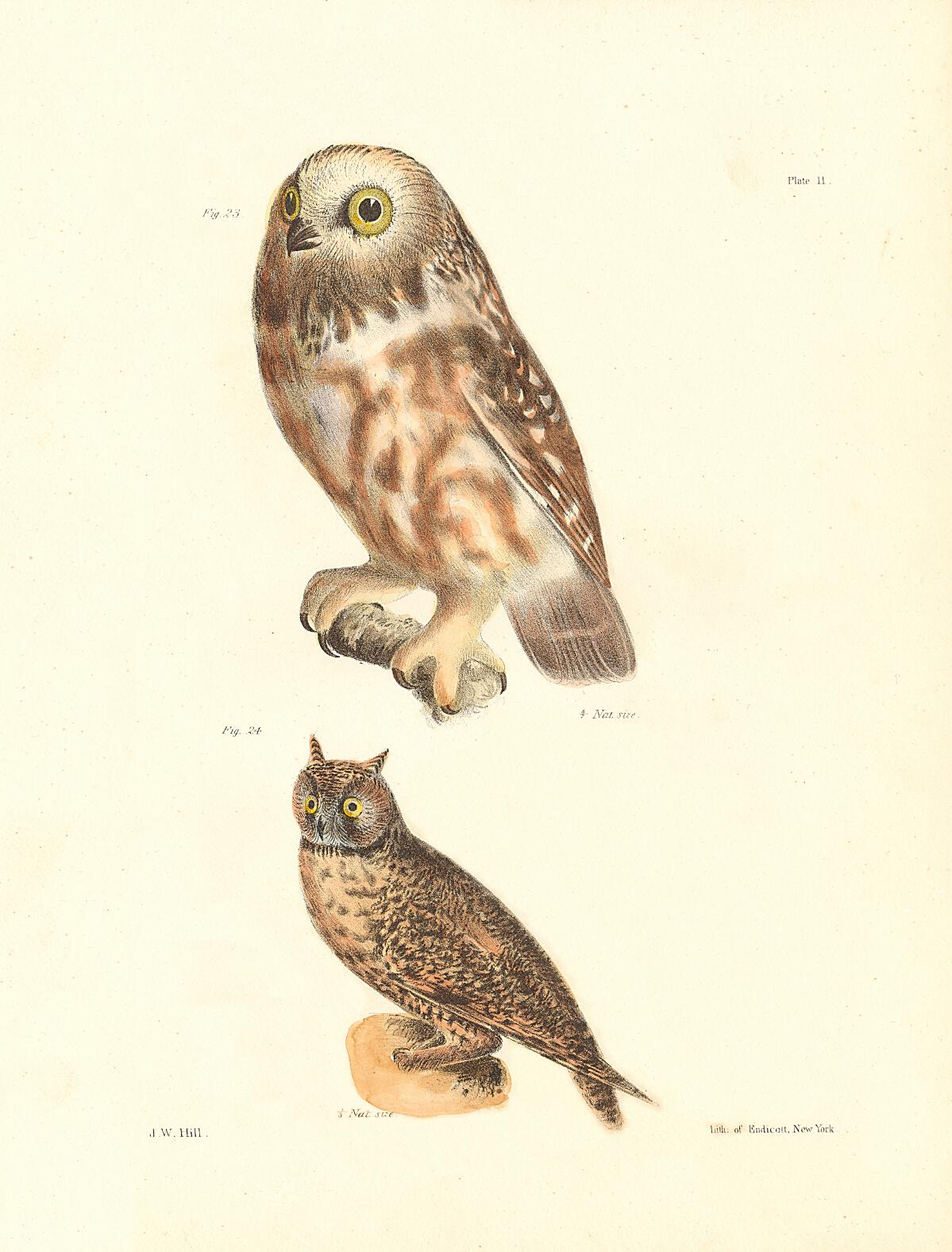
"Plate XI. Fig. 23. The Acadian Owl (Ulula acadica). 24. The Long eared Owl (Otus americanus)." Drawings by John William Hill in Zoology of New York.

James De Kay was born in Lisbon, Portugal, in 1792. When he was two years old, his family moved to New York; both his parents died while he was still quite young. He attended Yale from 1807 to 1812, but was expelled before completing his degree when he threatened a college tutor with a club. Later, he studied medicine at the University of Edinburgh, receiving his MD in 1819.

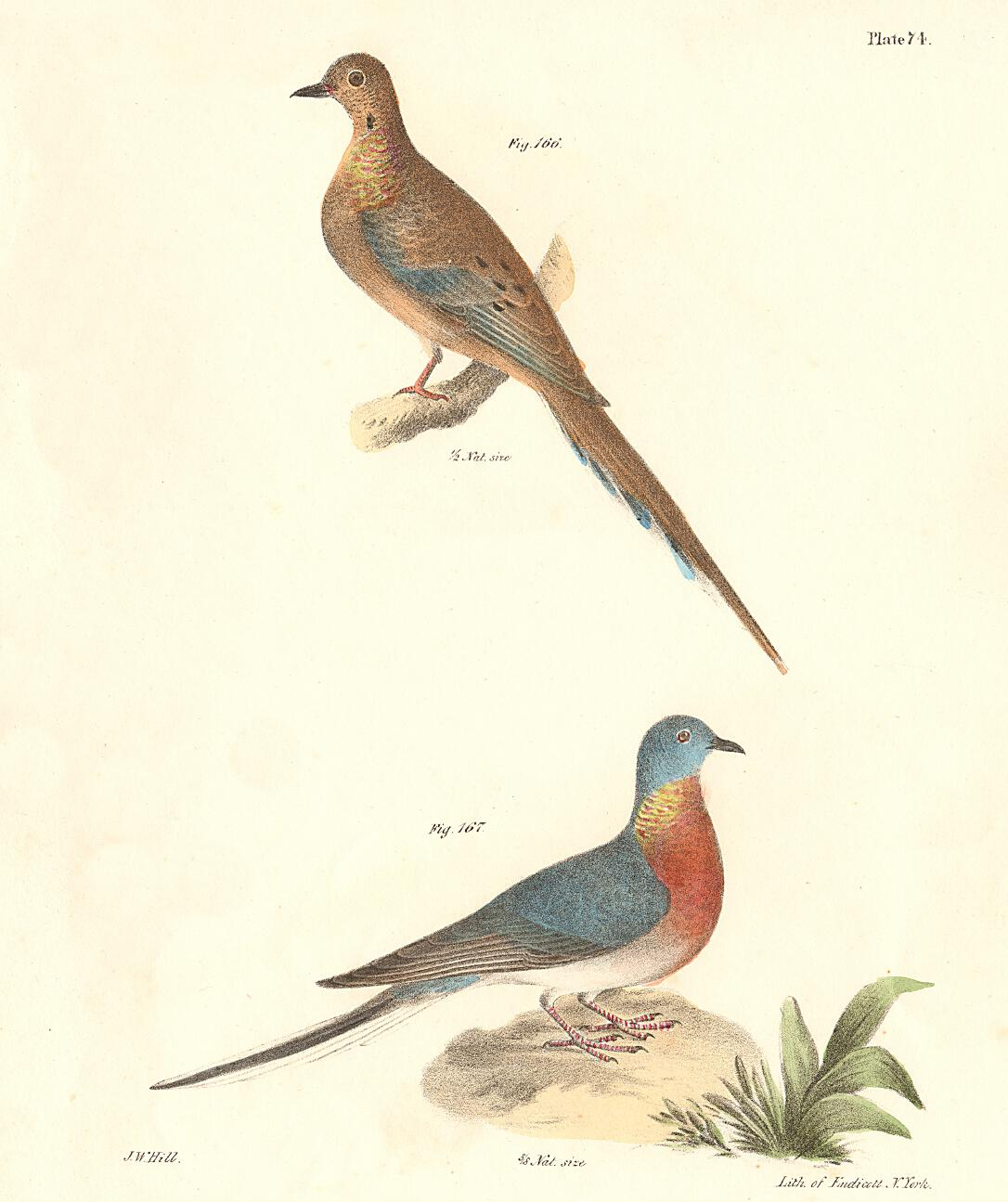
Plate LXXIV, mourning dove (Zenaida macroura) above, and passenger pigeon (Ectopistes migratorius) below, by Hill

After his return to the United States, he married Janet Eckford, a daughter of Henry Eckford, a ship builder. He then traveled with his father-in-law to Turkey as a ship's physician, and published a book, Sketches of Turkey in 1831 and 1832, about these travels. Although well received as an entertaining travelogue, his book has been criticized as being very anti-Hellenic as well as sometimes naive about Turkish customs. He was entrusted by Eckford with negotiations with Brazil and other South American powers, relative to the ships of war that had been ordered by the latter. In 1830, he was elected into the National Academy of Design as an honorary academician.

In 1833 his brother, George Coleman De Kay, married the only daughter of the poet Joseph Rodman Drake, and De Kay became familiar with Drake, Fitz-Greene Halleck, William Cullen Bryant, and other men of literature and science.

De Kay returned to Oyster Bay, New York, giving up medicine for the study of natural history. On the outbreak of cholera in New York City, De Kay hastened to give his services to the afflicted, although the practice of his profession was repugnant to him. He became involved with the Geological Survey of New York, initiated in 1835. As a result, from 1842 to 1844 he published the multi-volume Zoology of New York, or The New-York Fauna covering: mammals, birds, reptiles and amphibians and fish. This work was illustrated by the British born American painter John William Hill. Hill and De Kay spent much time in the field. By the end of April 1839, they had provided full descriptions and drawings for 700 of the nearly 2,300 animals they estimated to exist in New York, and begun rough descriptions of many more. In order to best represent the animals, Hill and De Kay early on decided to use a camera lucida for the rough drafts of the drawings. Hill's drawings of birds for De Kay's Zoology of New York were significant in that they represented the first time hand-colored lithographs were used to illustrate a state bird book.

De Kay collected the first specimen of a species of small brown snake on Long Island, which was named for him as Storeria dekayi (Holbrook, 1836). De Kay died at Oyster Bay in 1851.

Historical species named after him include Dipleura dekayi, Eurypterus dekayi, Eutrephoceras dekayi, Mosasaurus dekayi, and Trimerus dekayi.

== Gallery ==
=== Images from Zoology of New York, Part II, Birds ===
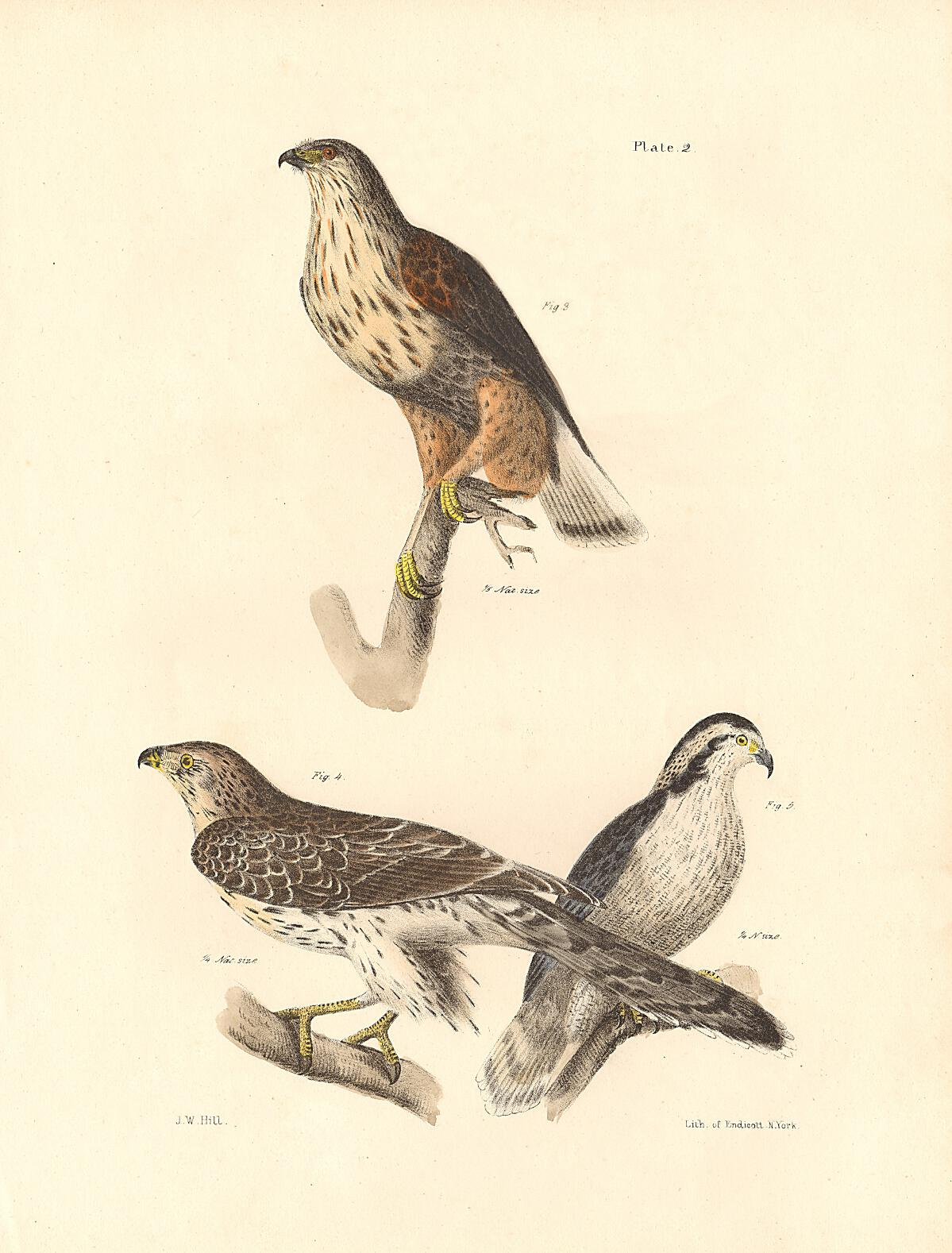
"Plate II. Fig. 3. The Rough-legged Buzzard (Buteo sancti-joannis). 4, 5. The American Goshawk (Astur atricapillus)."

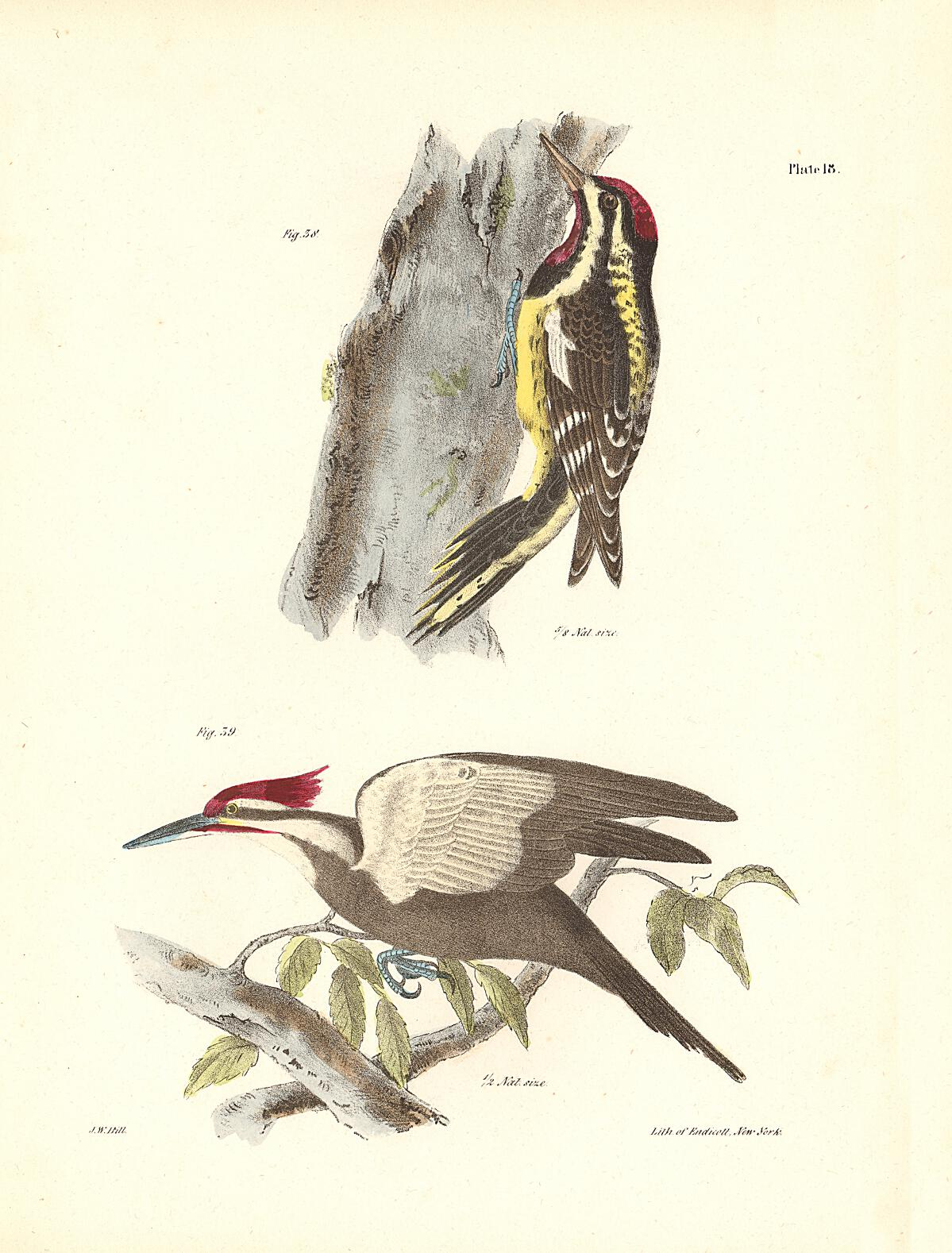
Plate XVIII

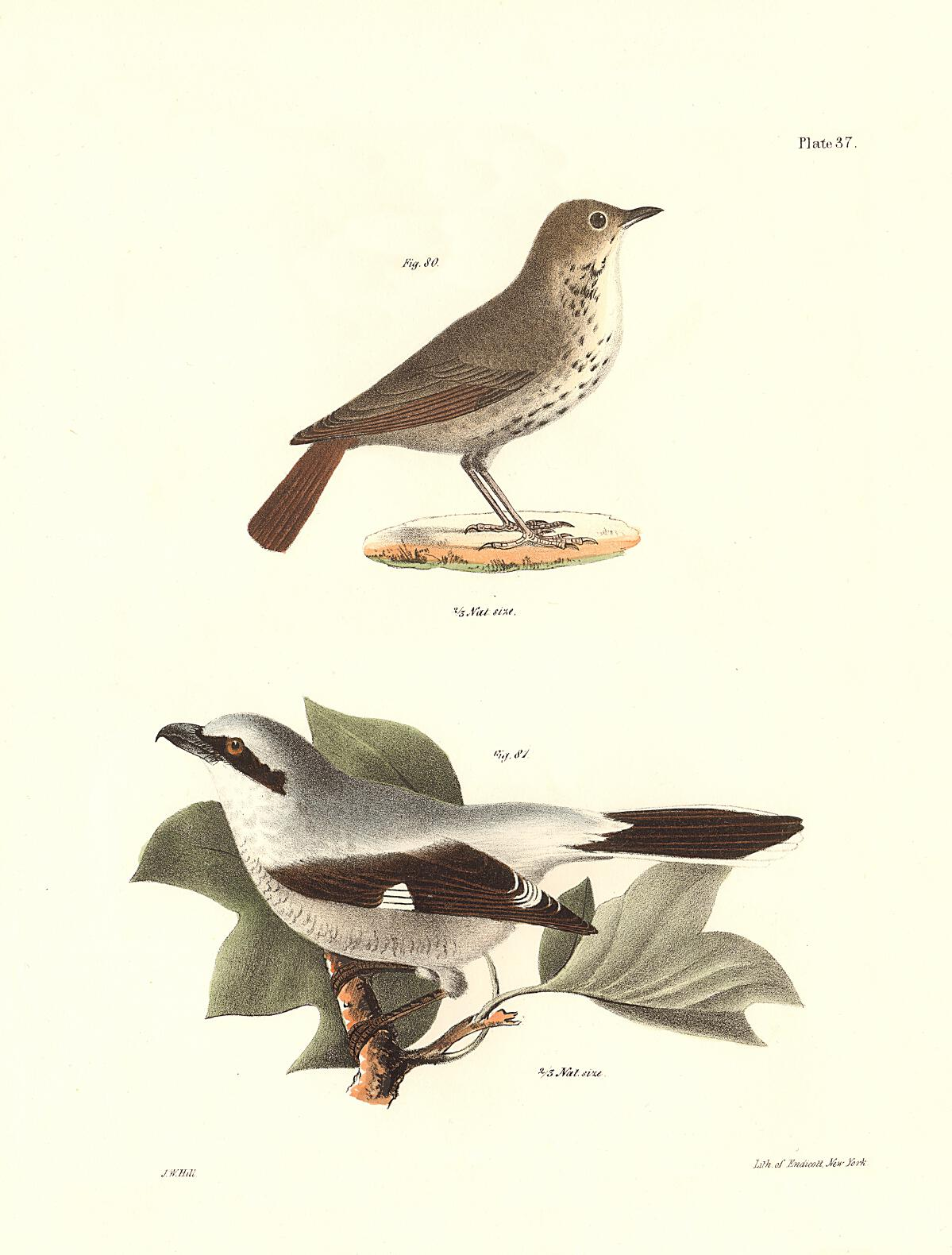
Plate XXXVII, hermit thrush above, and "Northern Butcher-bird" (likely not a true butcherbird, but a shrike below

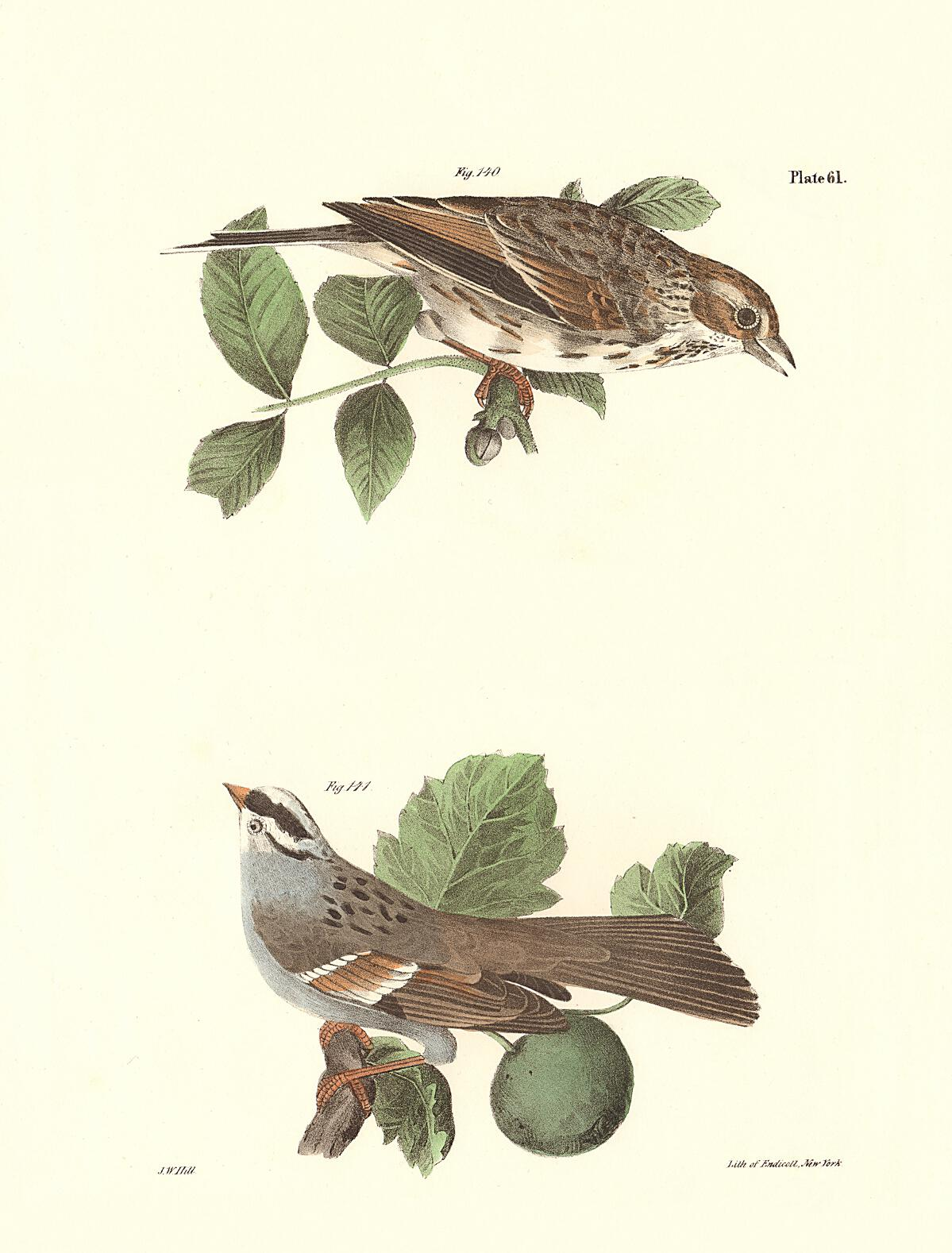
Plate LXI

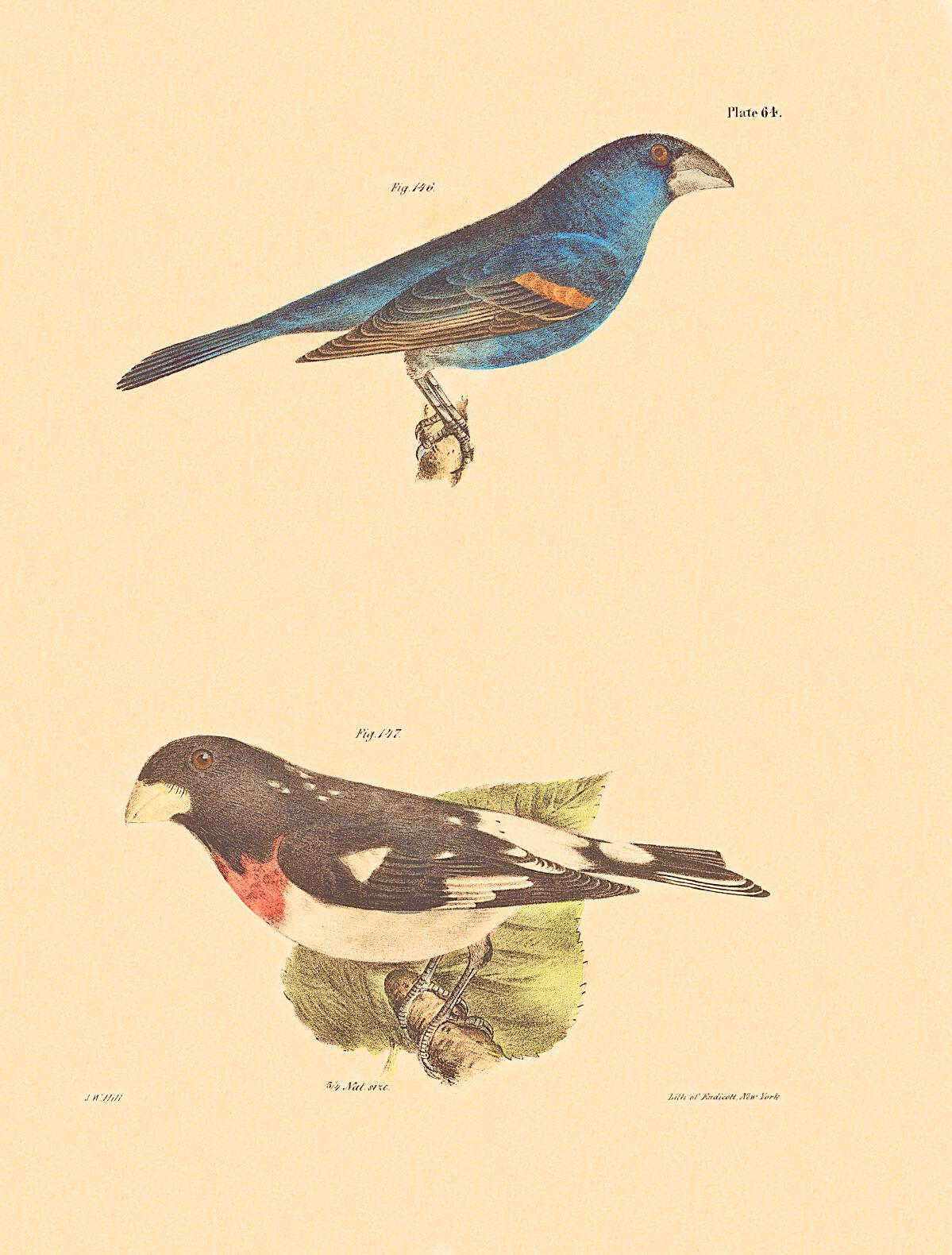
Plate LXIV

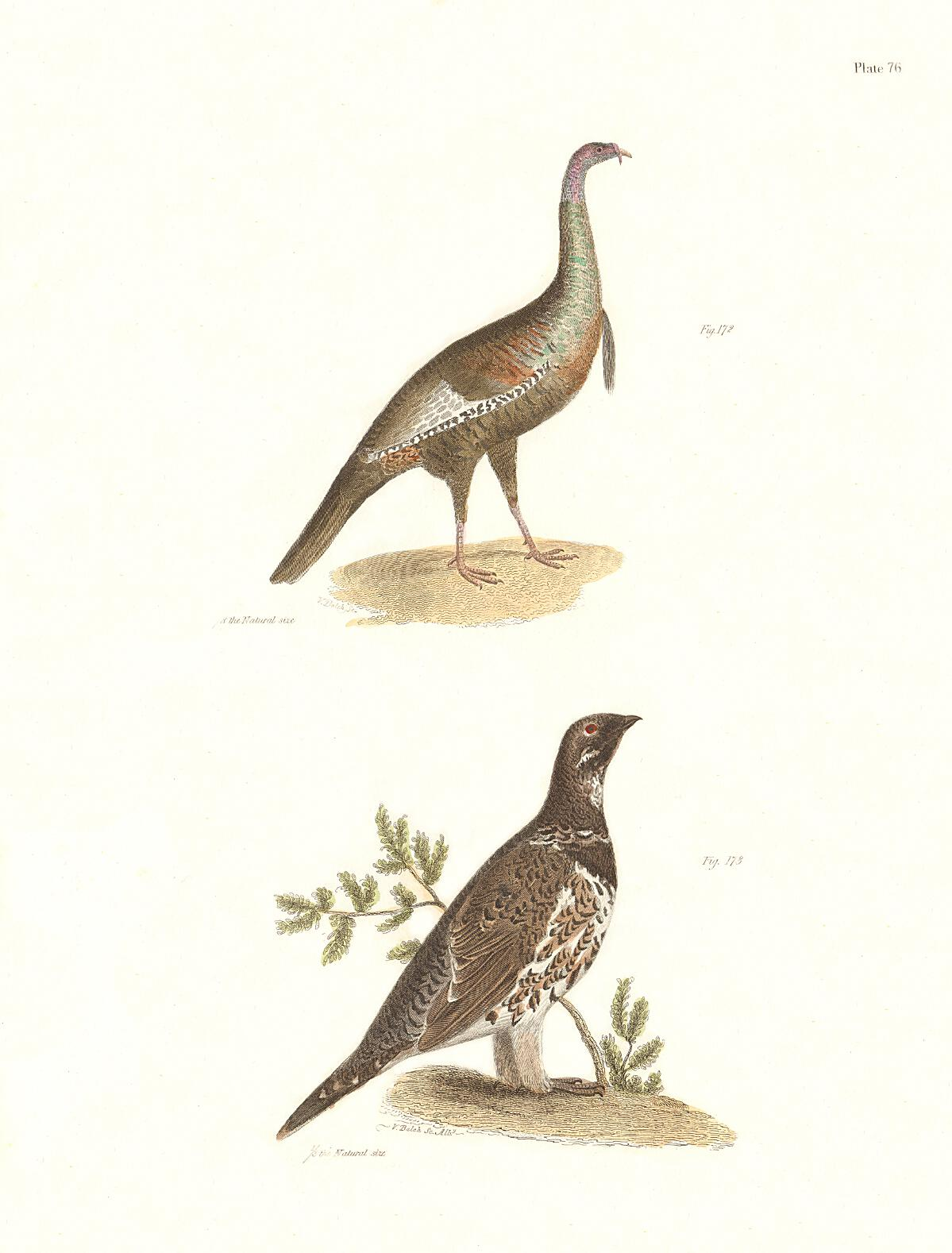
Plate LXXVI

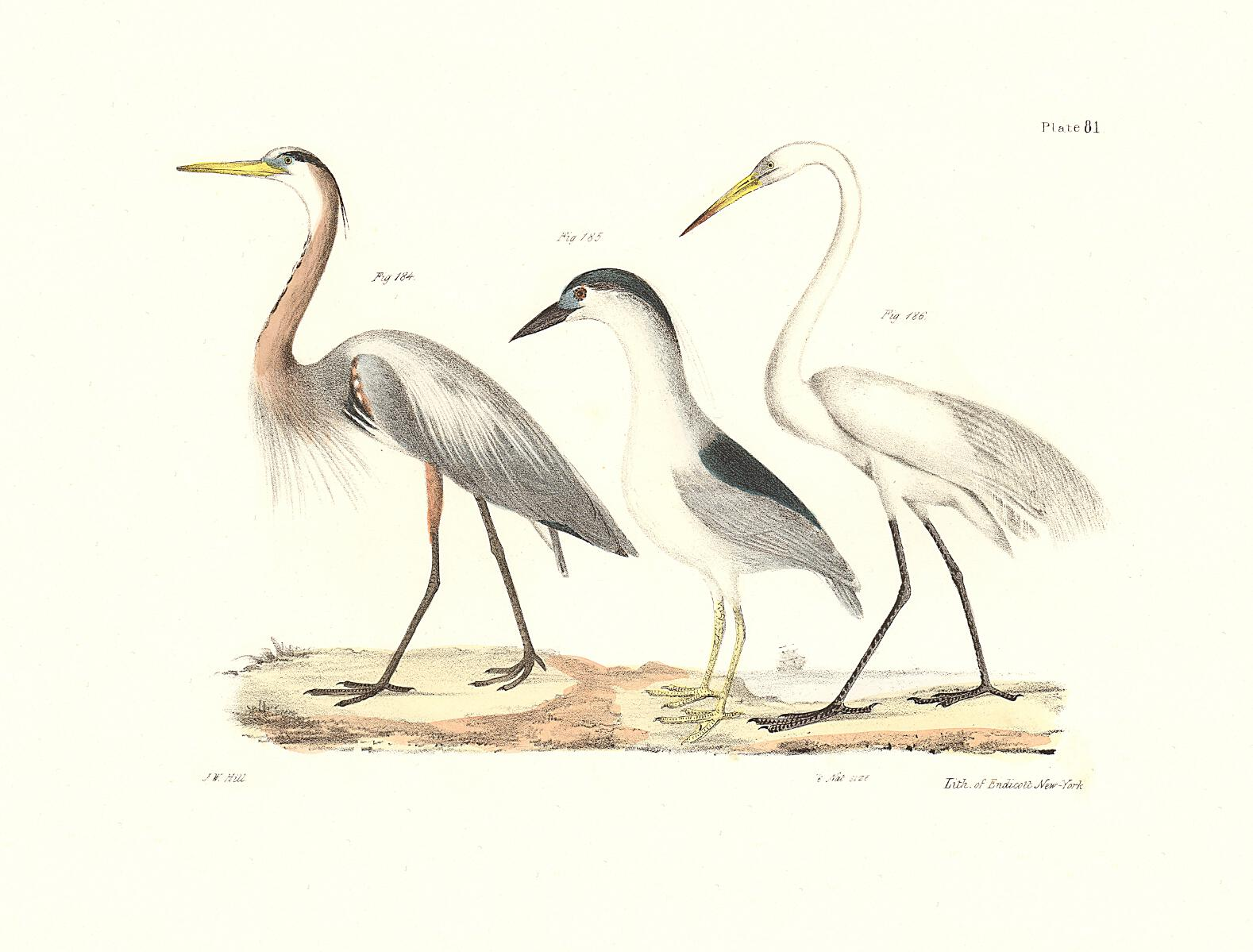
Plate LXXXI

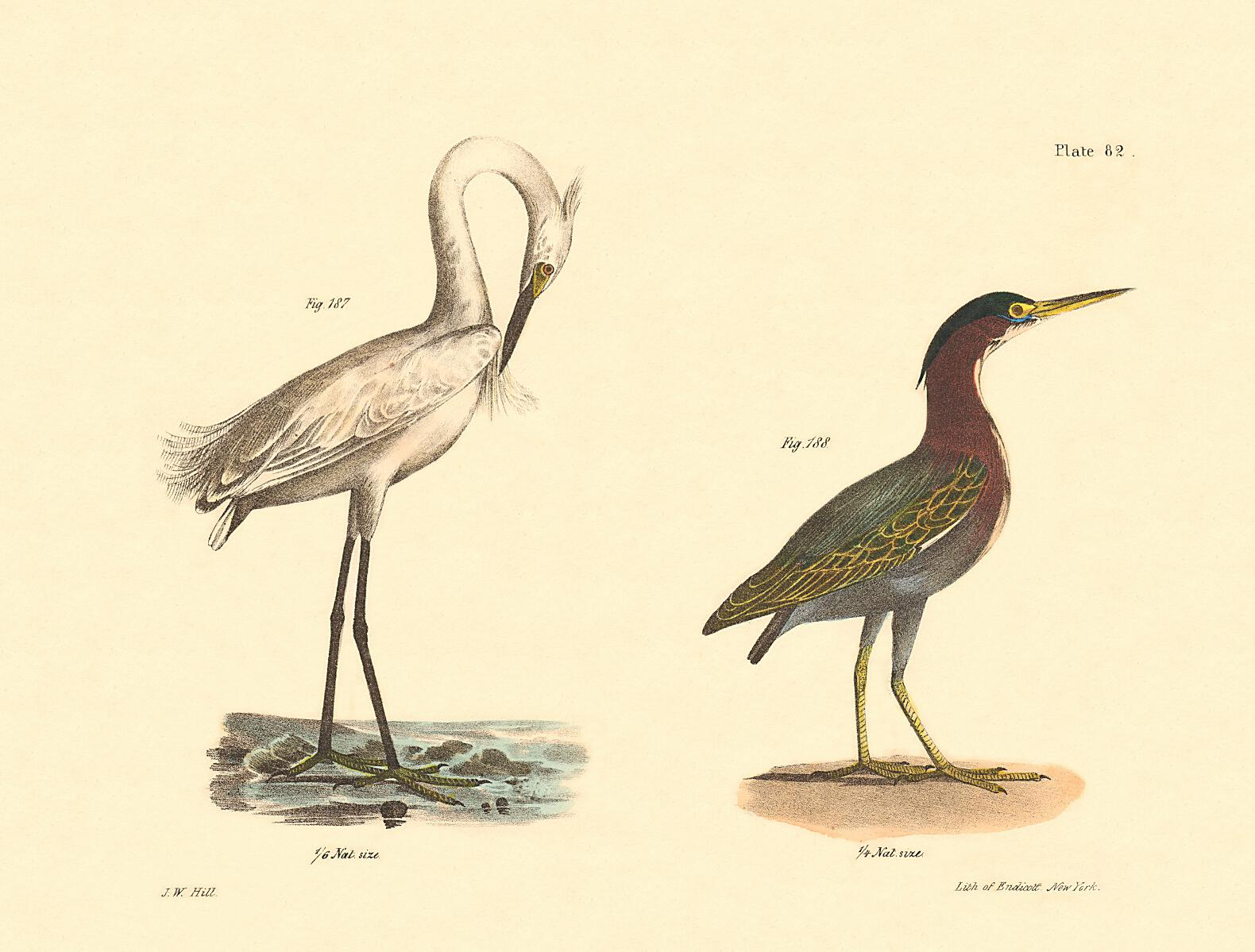
Plate LXXXII

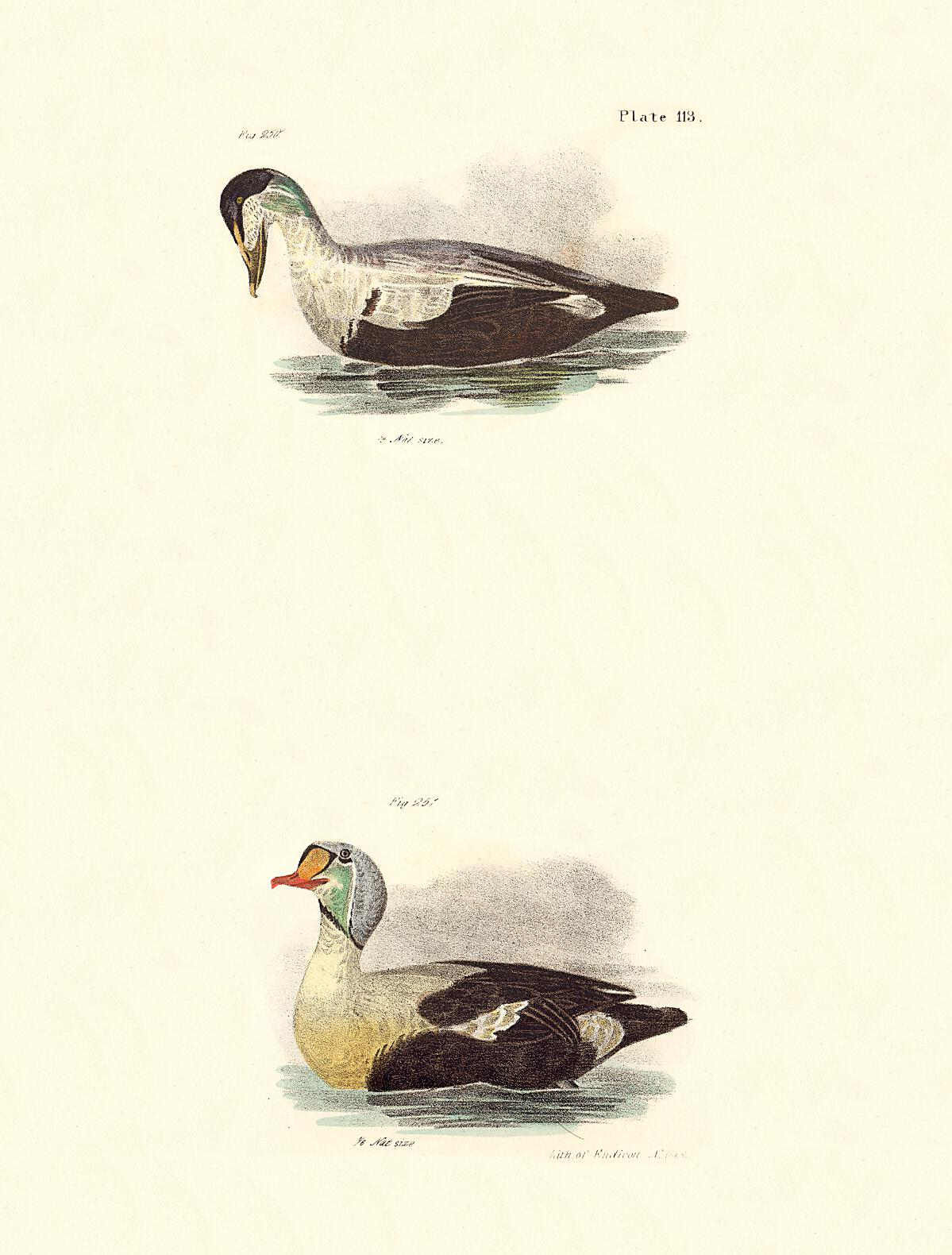
Plate CXIII

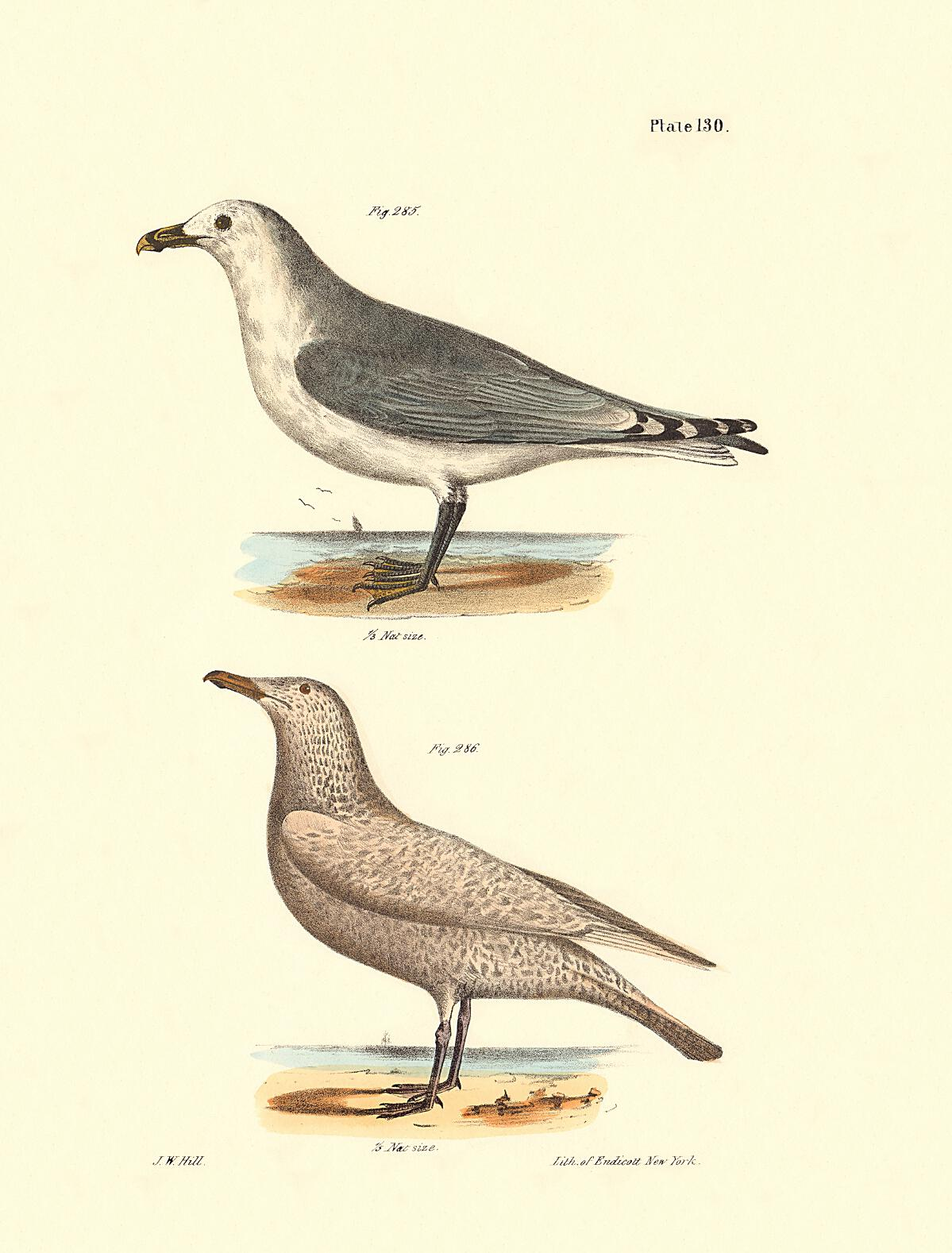
Plate CXXX

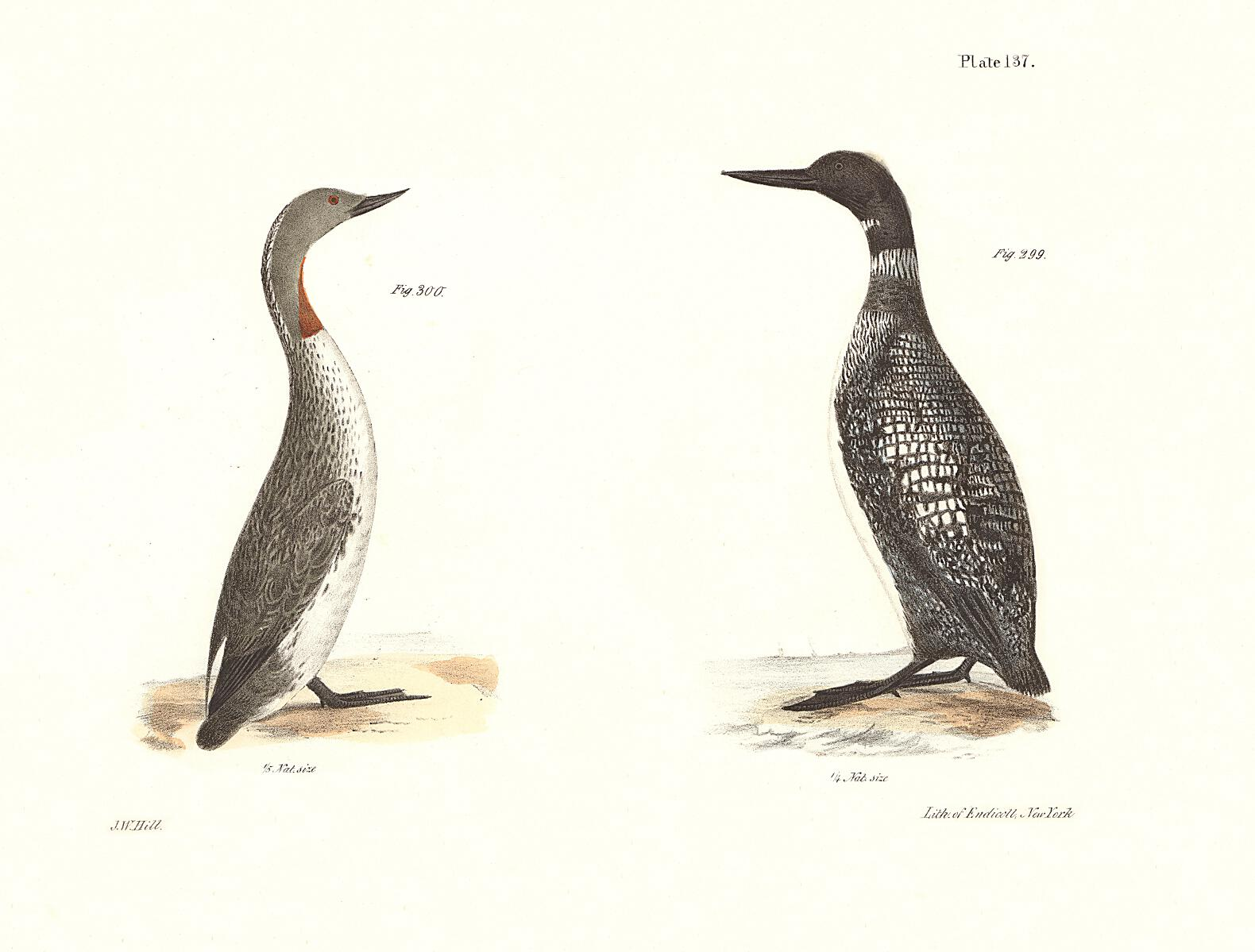
"Plate CXXXVII Fig. 299. The Great Loon (Colymbus glacialis).
300. The Red-throated Loon (Colymbus septentrionalis)."

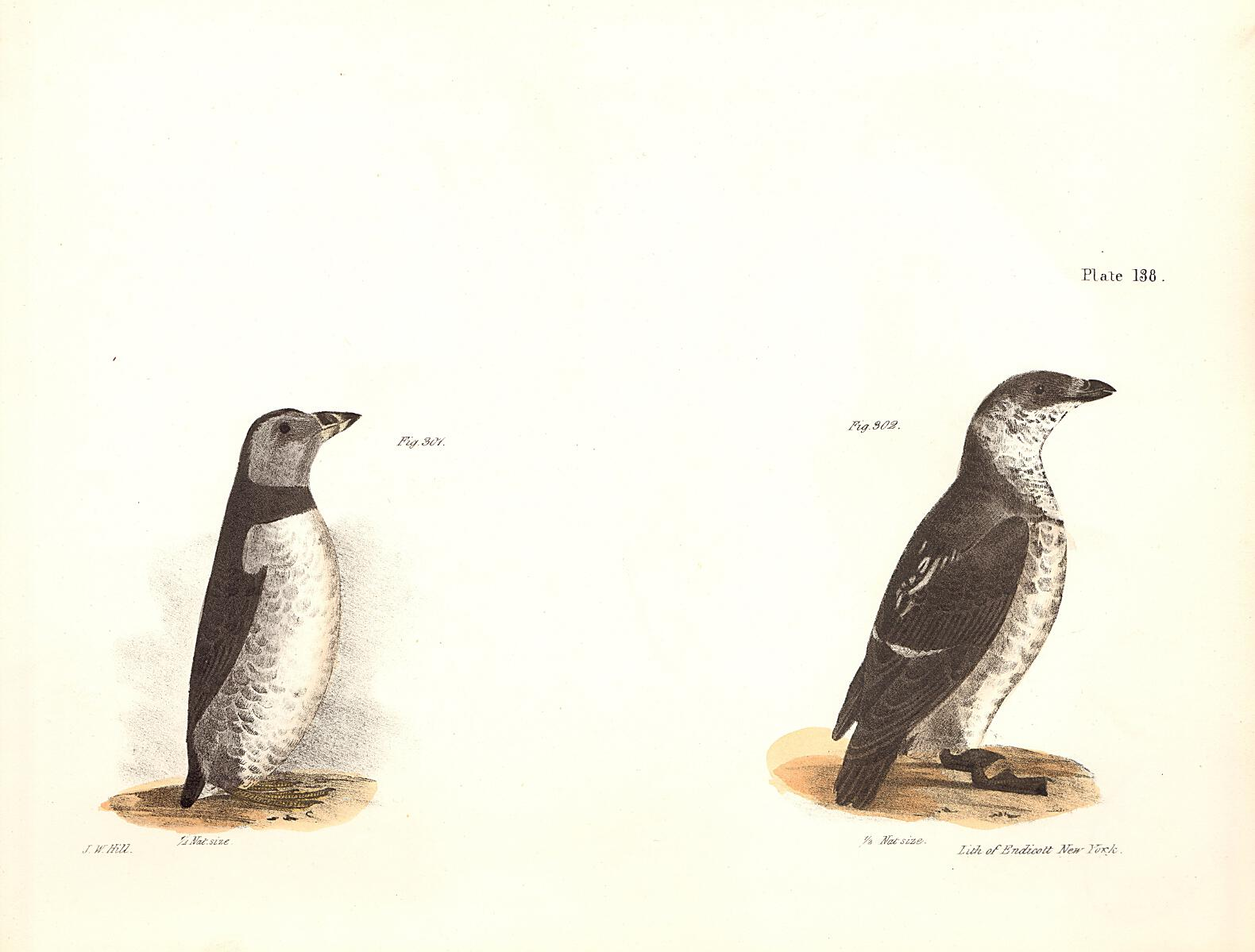
Plate CXXXIV, Atlantic puffin left, and little auk right

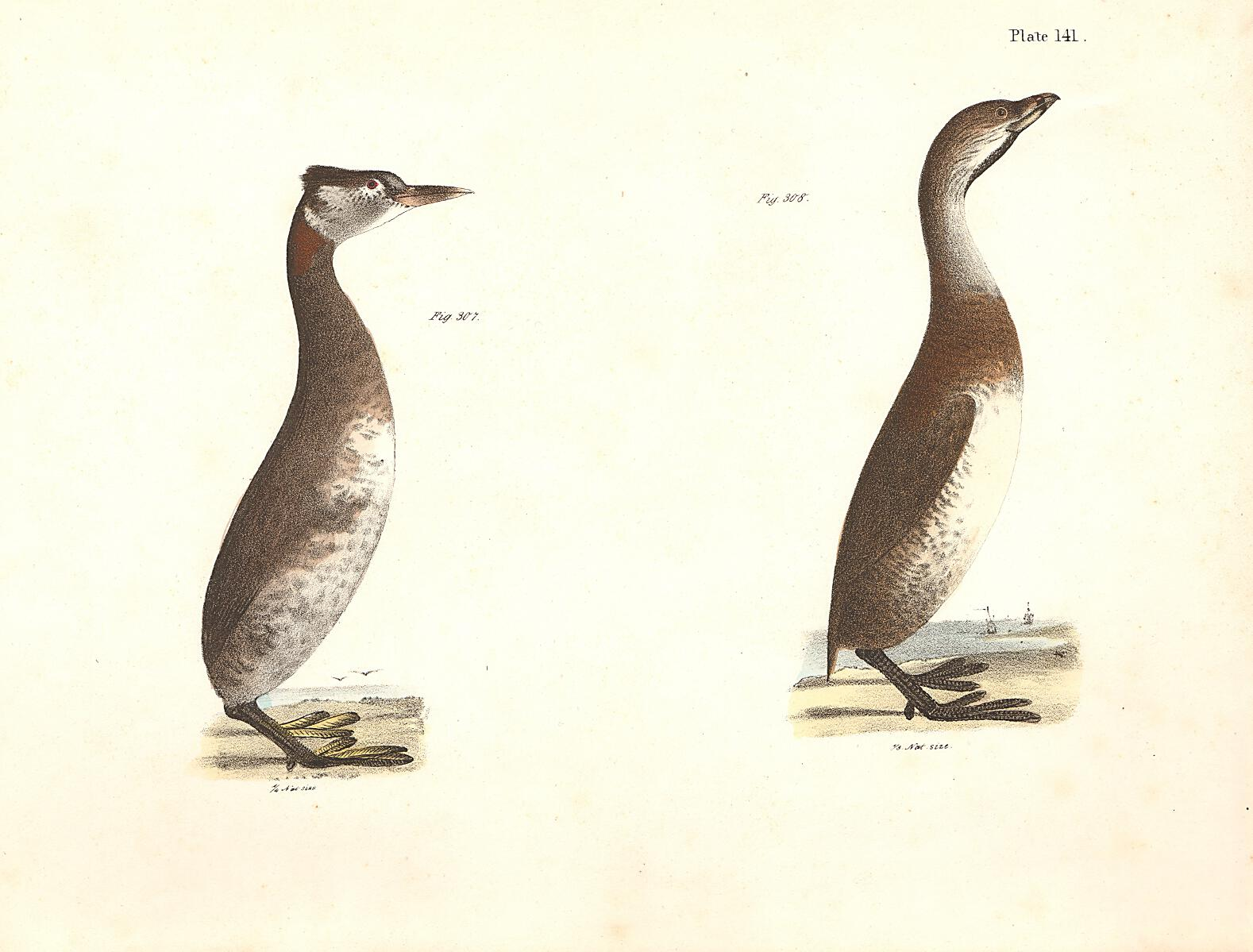
Plate CXLI, red-necked grebe left, and dipper right

=== Images from Zoology of New York, Part V, Mollusca and Part VI, Crustacea ===
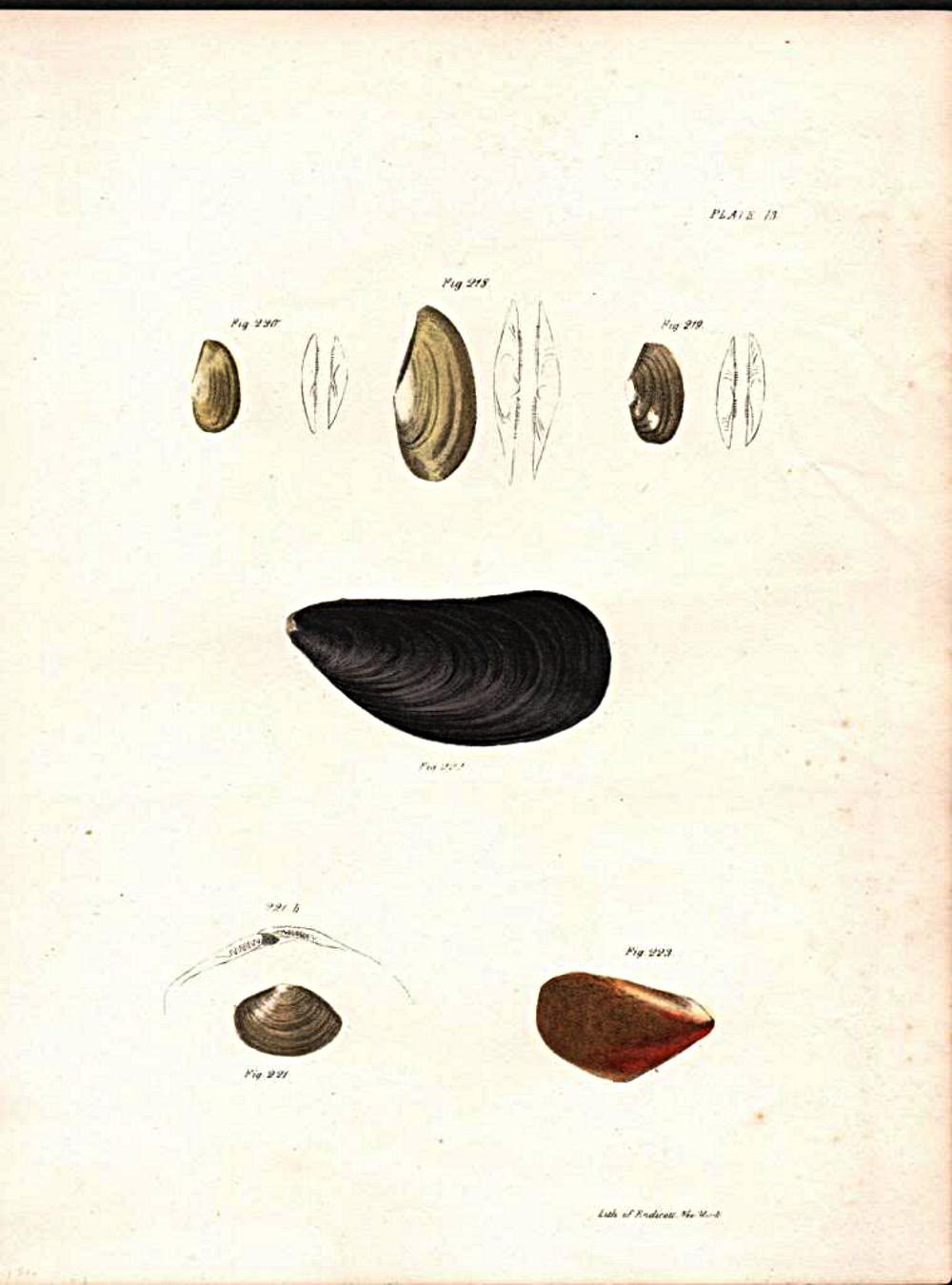
Mollusca Plate 13

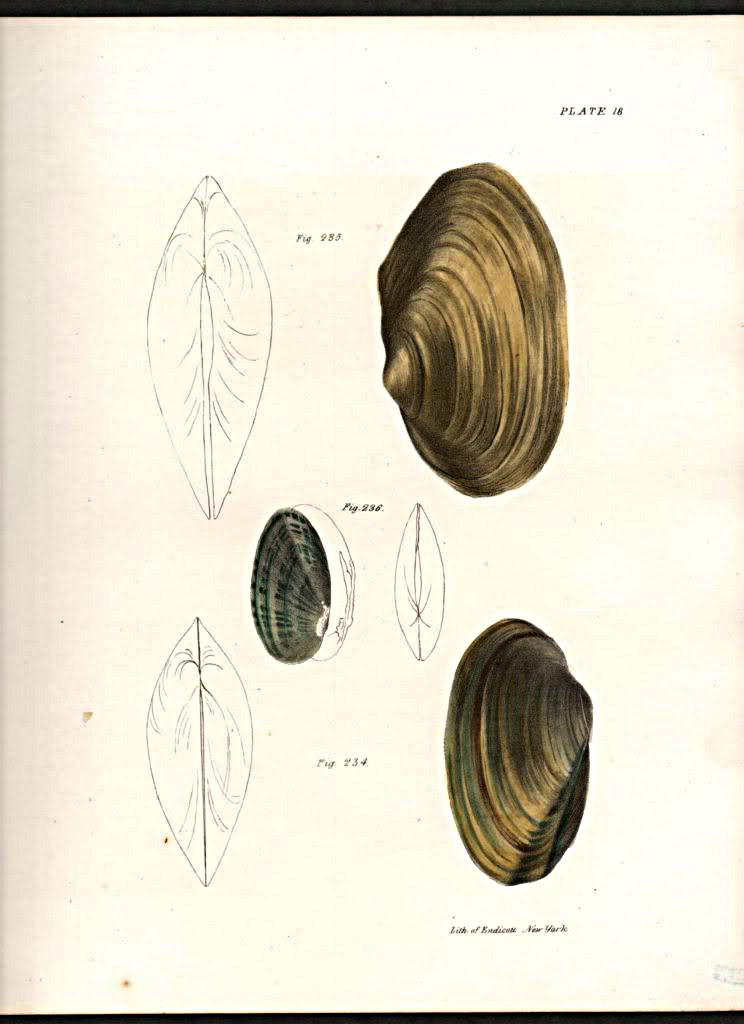
Mollusca Plate 18

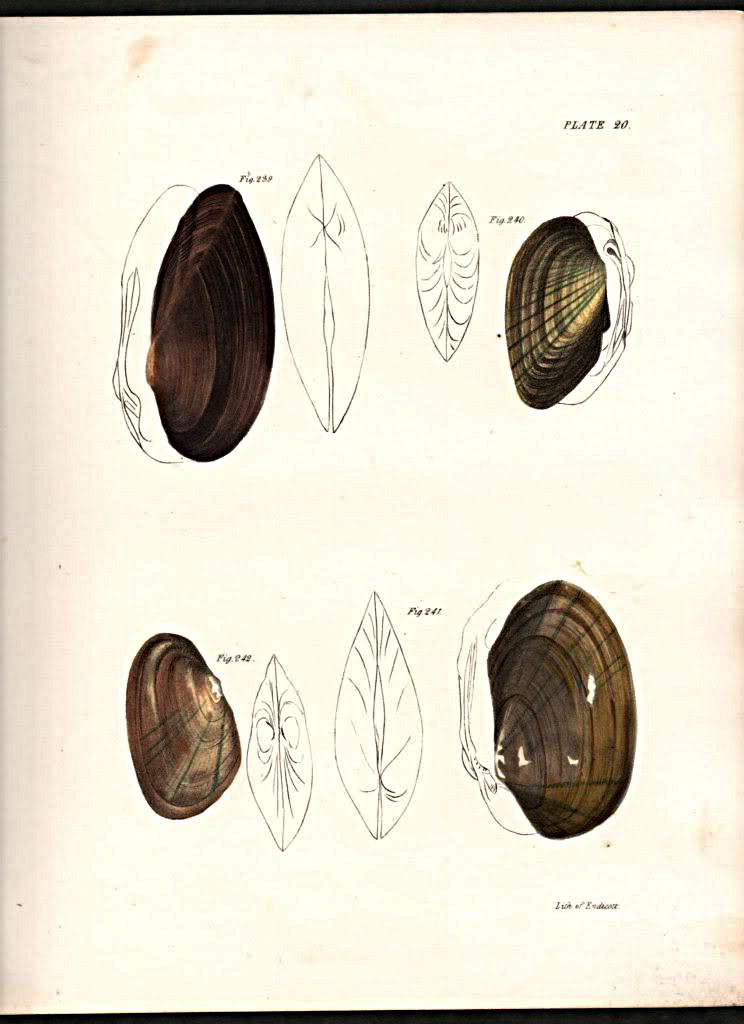
Mollusca Plate 20

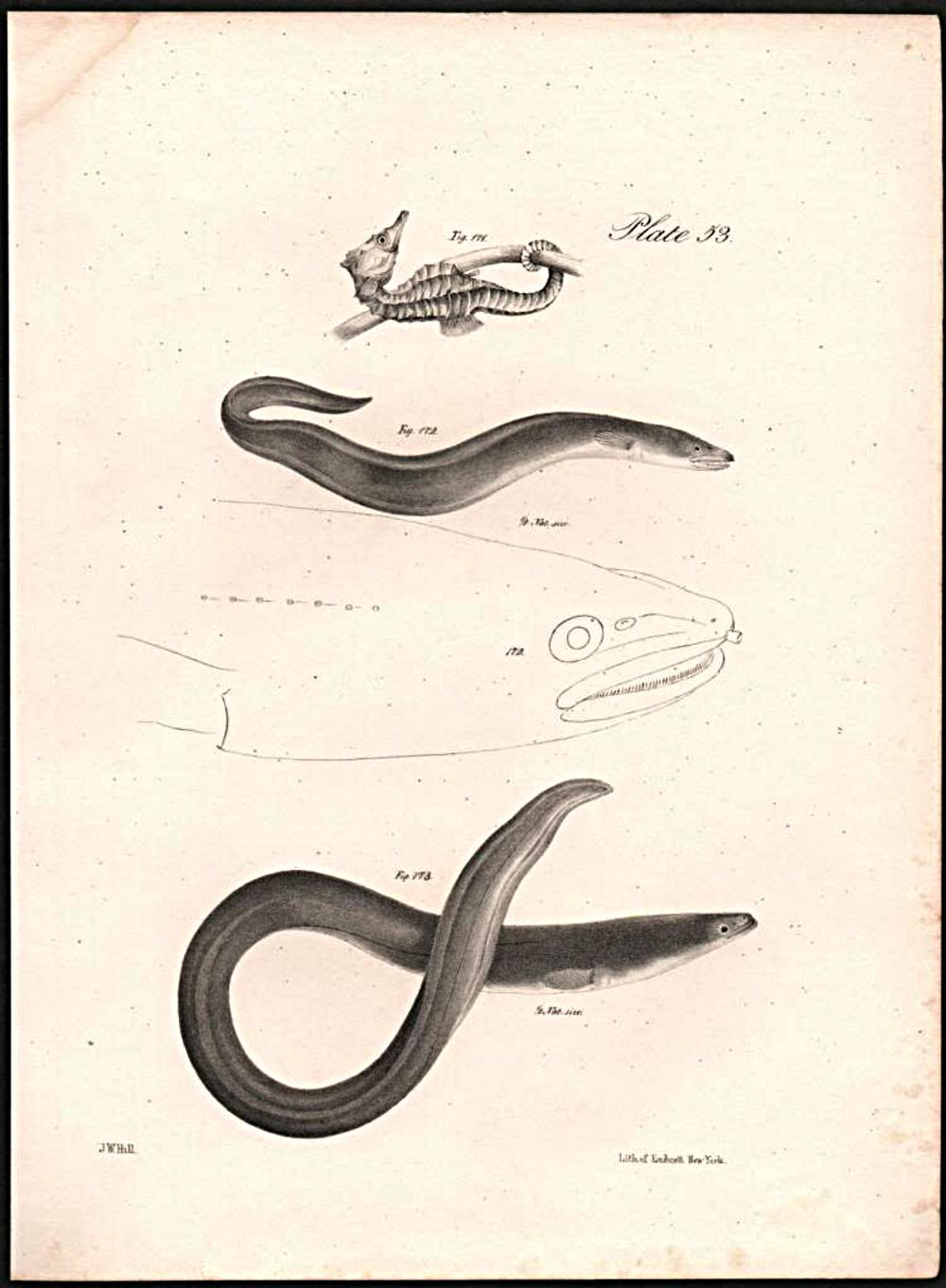
Mollusca Plate 53

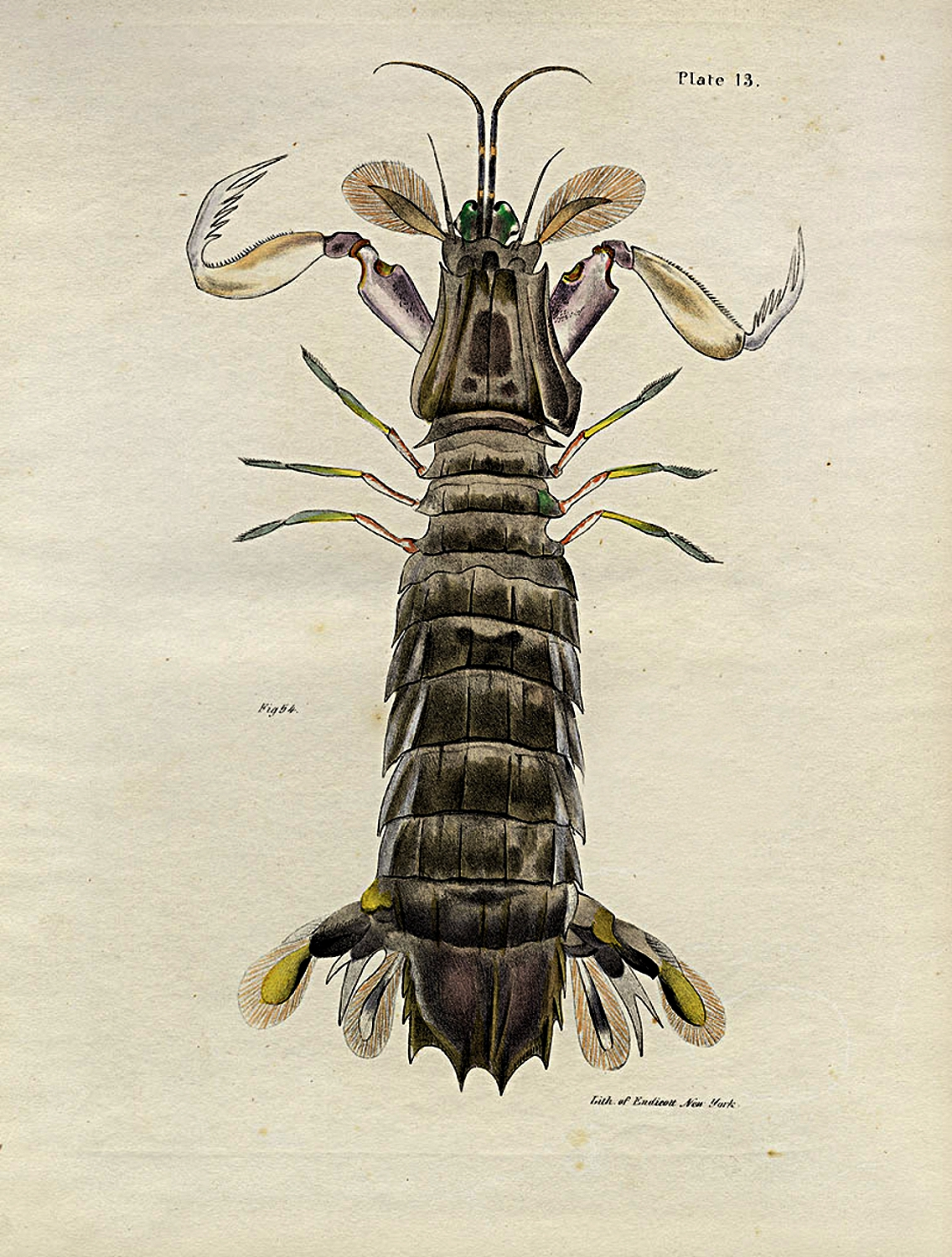
Crustacea Plate 13

== See also ==
- Category:Taxa named by James Ellsworth De Kay
