= Clarence Cook =

American writer and art critic

Clarence Chatham Cook (September 8, 1828 – June 2, 1900) was a 19th-century American author and art critic.

Born in Dorchester, Massachusetts, Cook graduated from Harvard in 1849 and worked as a teacher. Between 1863 and 1869, Cook wrote a series of articles about American art for The New York Tribune. In 1869, he moved to France and was the Parisian correspondent for The New York Tribune until the onset of the Franco-Prussian War.

Cook was known for his expertise in archeology and antiquities and was instrumental in the criticism of the collection of General di Cesnola.

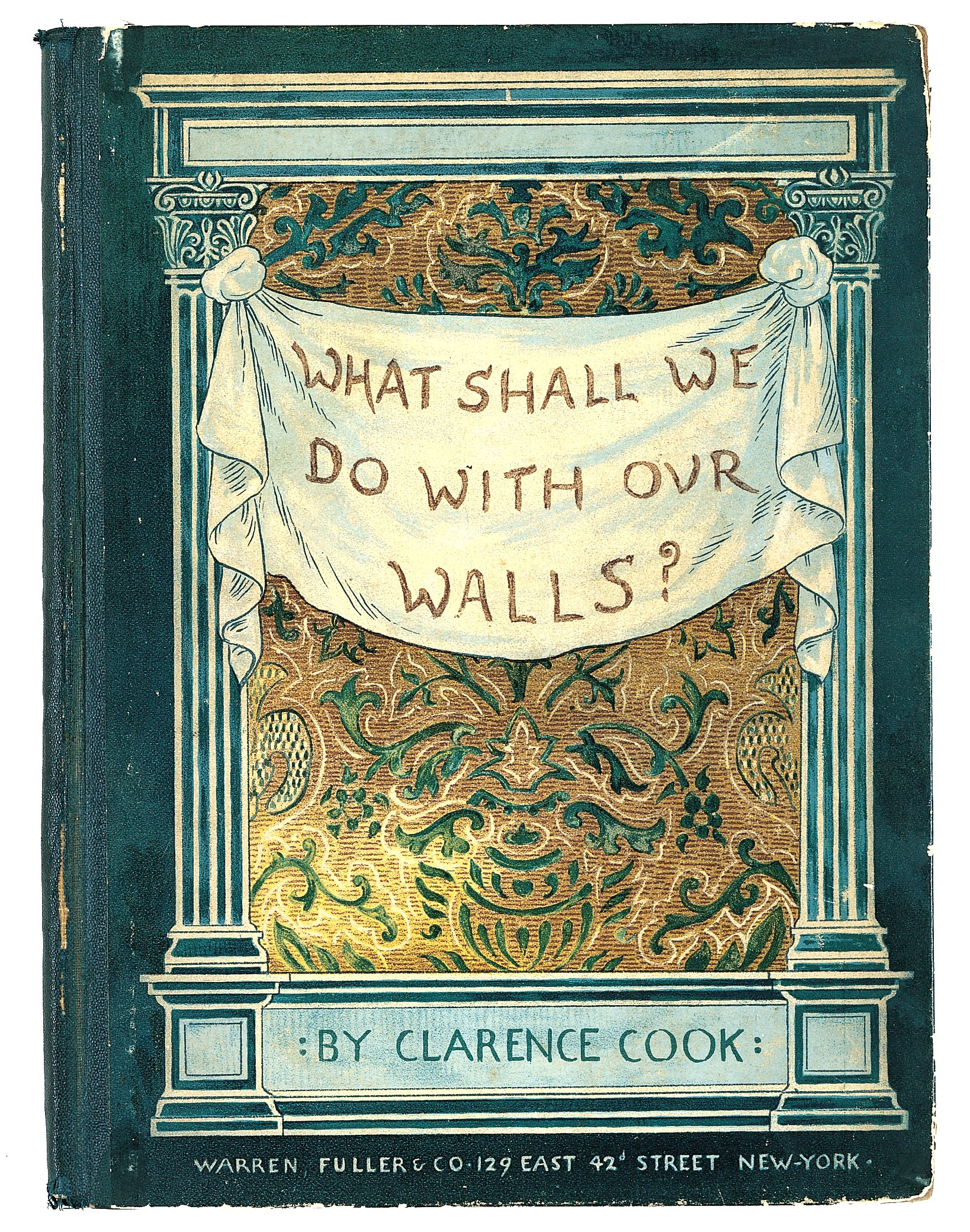
What Shall We Do With Our Walls by Clarence Cook, illustrated by Louis Comfort Tiffany and Samuel Colman

In the mid-1850s Cook began to read works by John Ruskin and associated with a group of American artists, writers, and architects who followed Ruskin's thinking. Through this group he became aware of the British Pre-Raphaelite Brotherhood. In 1863, with Clarence King and John William Hill he helped to found the Society for the Advancement of Truth in Art, an American group, similar to the Pre-Raphaelites, who published a journal called The New Path.

In 1869 Cook wrote A Description of the New York Central Park. In 1877, articles on home furnishings that Cook had written for Scribner's Monthly were published as a book entitled The House Beautiful. In 1879, Cook served as editor for Wilhelm Lübke's History of Art.

Cook died at his home in Fishkill Landing, New York, from complications of Bright's Disease. He was 71.

== Family ==
On October 26, 1852, Cook married Louisa DeWindt Whittemore, daughter of John P. DeWindt and Caroline A. Smith and widow of Samuel Whittemore Jr. They had a daughter, Clara, who died at one year 5 months old (February 4, 1853 – July 25, 1854). Louisa was a granddaughter of William Stephens Smith and Abigail "Nabby" Adams Smith and great-granddaughter of President John Adams and Abigail Adams.

== See also ==
- Hudson River School
- Luigi Palma di Cesnola
