= Thomas Charles Farrer =

American painter

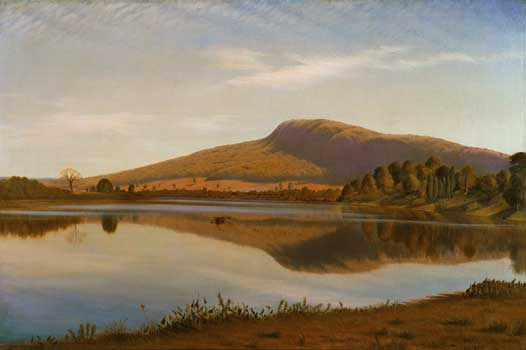
Mount Holyoke, 1865

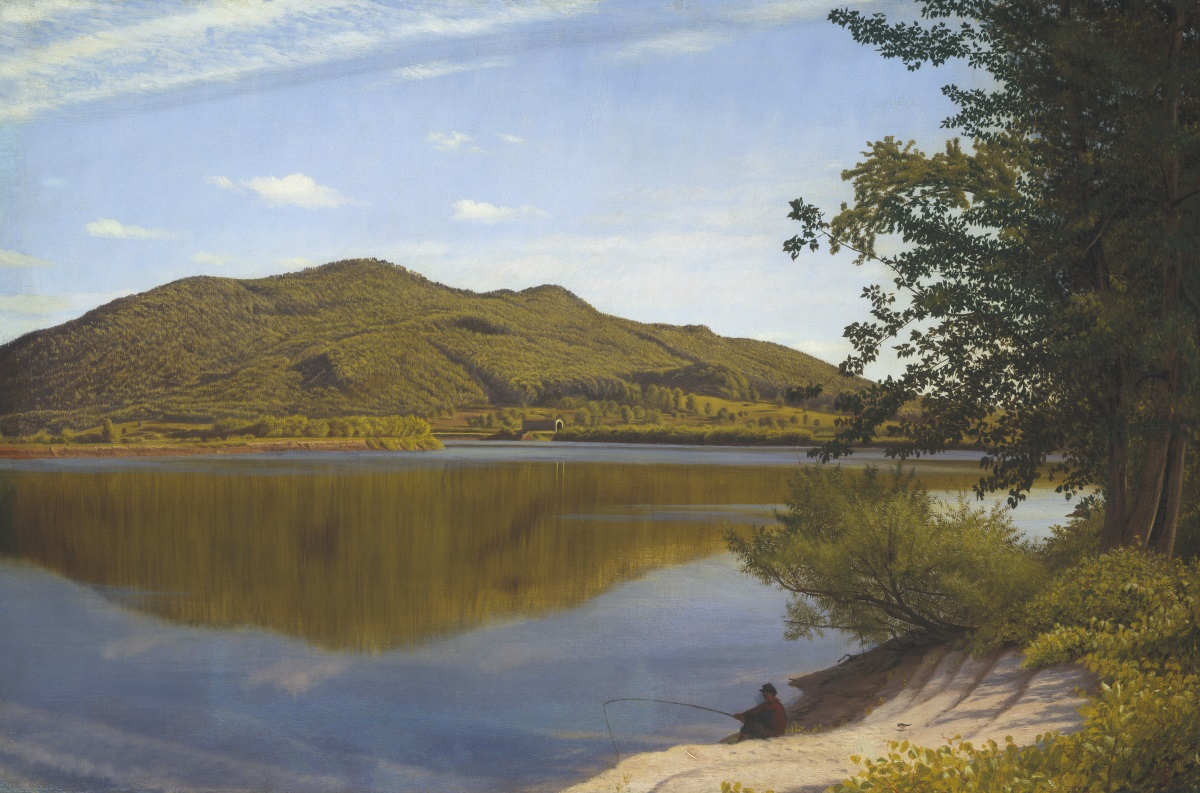
Mount Tom, 1865

Thomas Charles Farrer (16 December 1838 in London – 16 June 1891 in London) was an English-born painter and teacher of painting who also worked in the United States. Among his students was Francis Lathrop.

== Biography ==
He learned drawing in a free school established in London by John Ruskin, and came to New York in 1858, where he was a successful painting instructor. He served in the Union Army during the American Civil War. In 1869, he returned to London.

== Works ==
Among his works exhibited at the National Academy in New York City were "Field-Lily" and "Twilight on the Hudson" (1867); "Beach at Hastings" and "English Farm" (1871); "Caernarvon Castle, Wales" and "Interior of St. Mark's, Venice" (1872); "Sunset" (1875); "Yorkshire Trout Stream," "Coming through the Lock," and "Rochester Castle" (1878). He has also contributed paintings to the exhibitions of the Royal Academy in London.

== Family ==
T. C. Farrar's brother Henry Farrer (born in London, 23 March 1843; died 1903) was a painter and etcher. Henry came to New York in 1863, where he first gained distinction for his watercolors, and afterward was highly regarded as a landscape painter. He was a member of the New York Etching Club and of the American Society of Painters in Watercolors. Henry's principal works are "On the East River," "A Hot Day," "A Calm Afternoon," "Sunset, Coast of Maine," "The Silent Tongue," "The Old Homestead at Twilight," and a "November Day." He contributed "A Windy Day" and "The Old House on the Hill" to the Centennial exhibition at Philadelphia, and "A Quiet Pool" to the Paris exhibition of 1878.
