= New Haven, Connecticut =

New Haven
- City
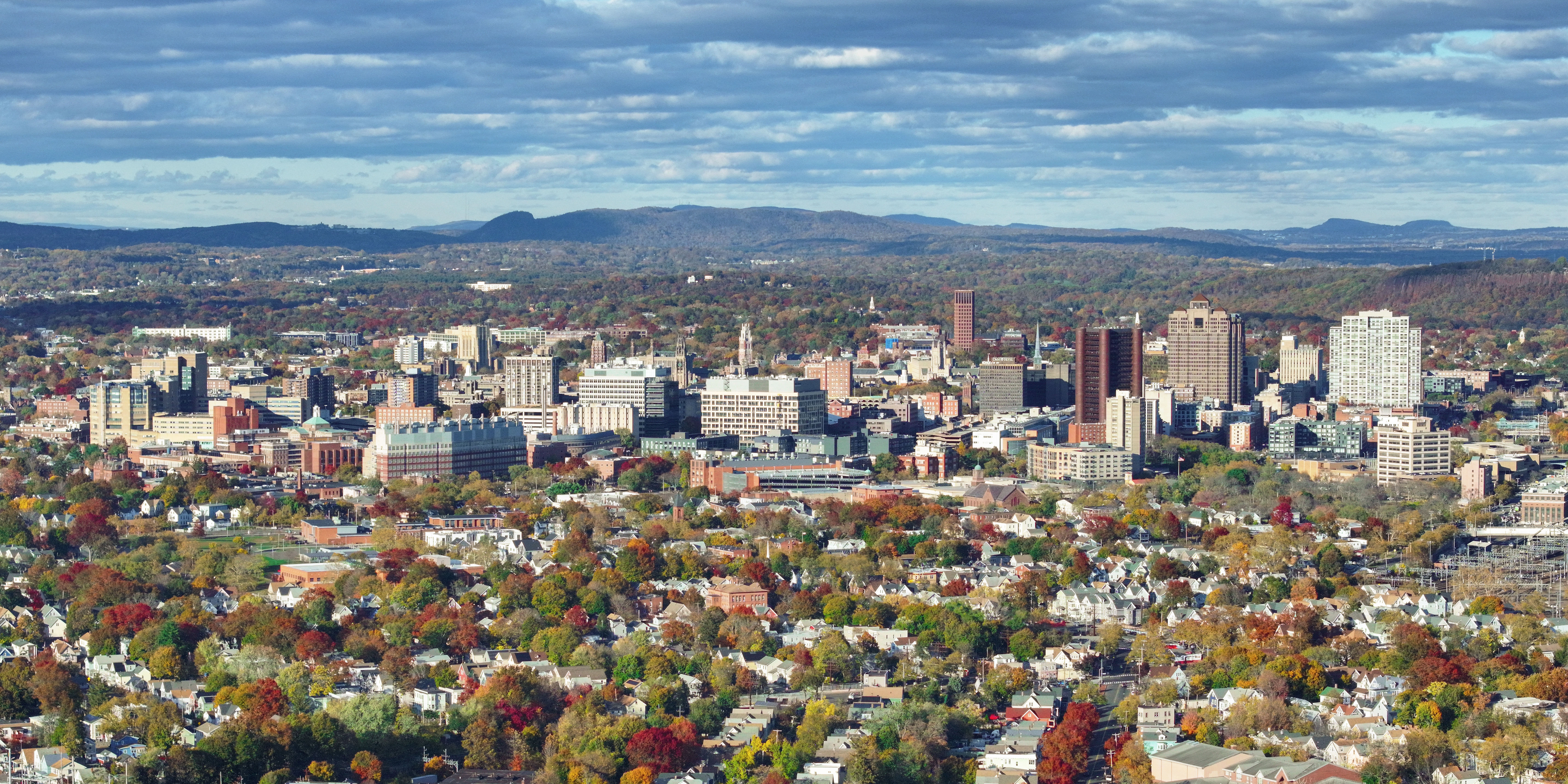
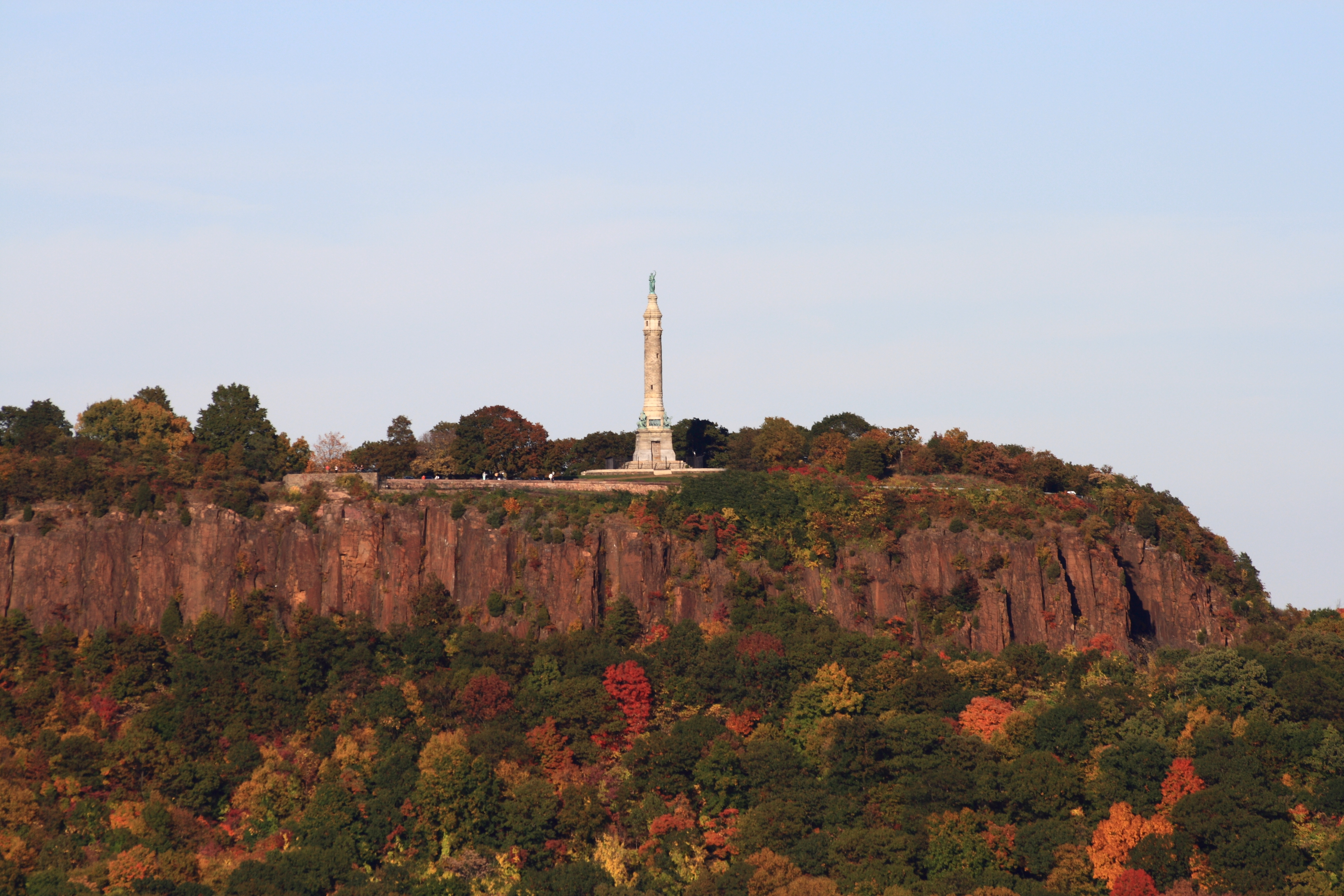
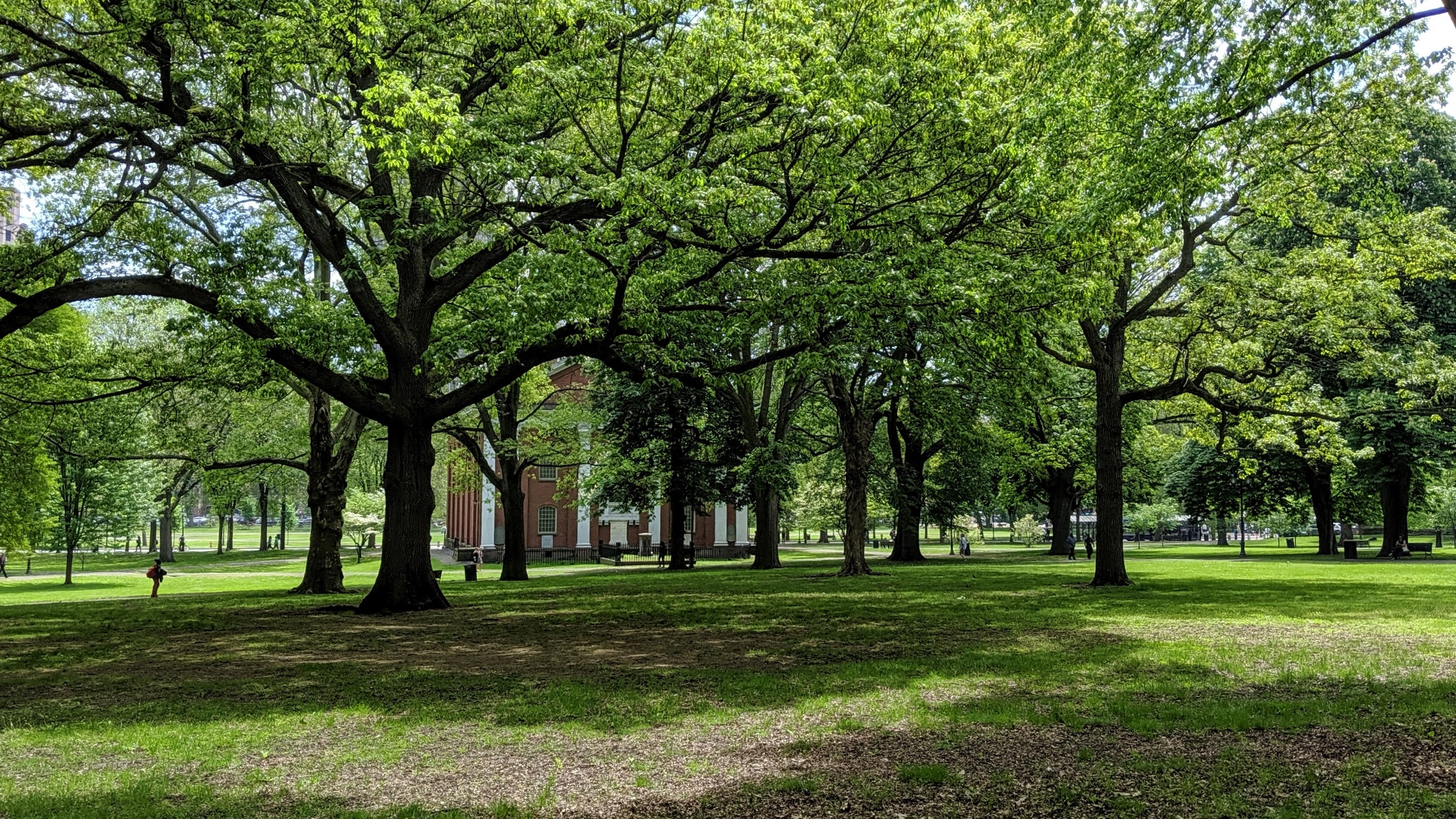
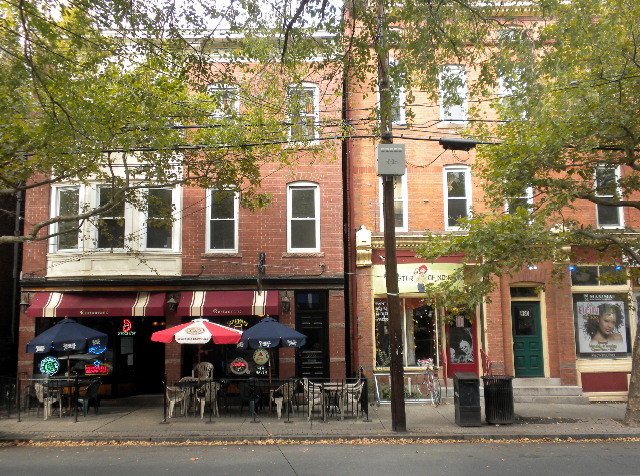
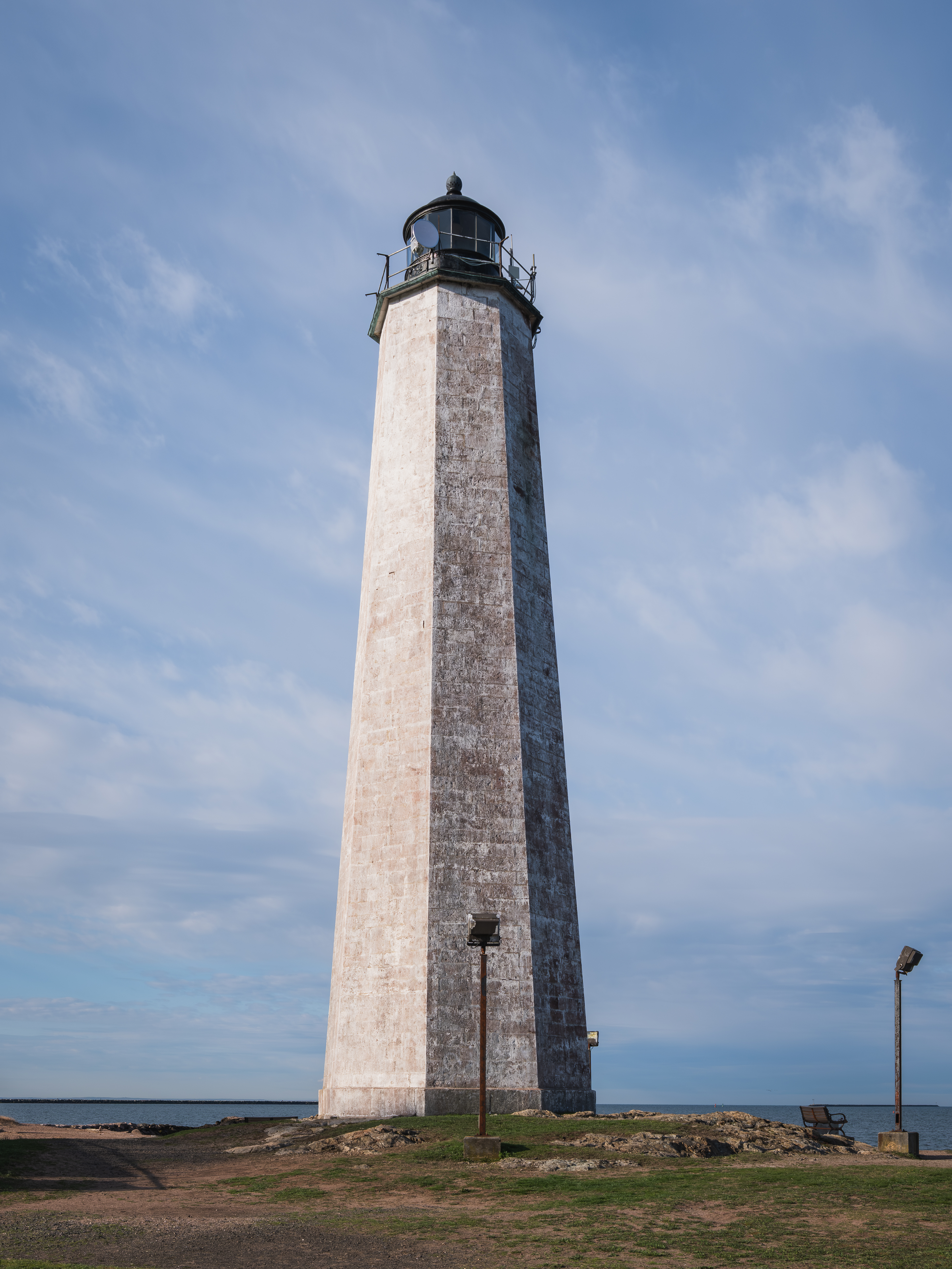
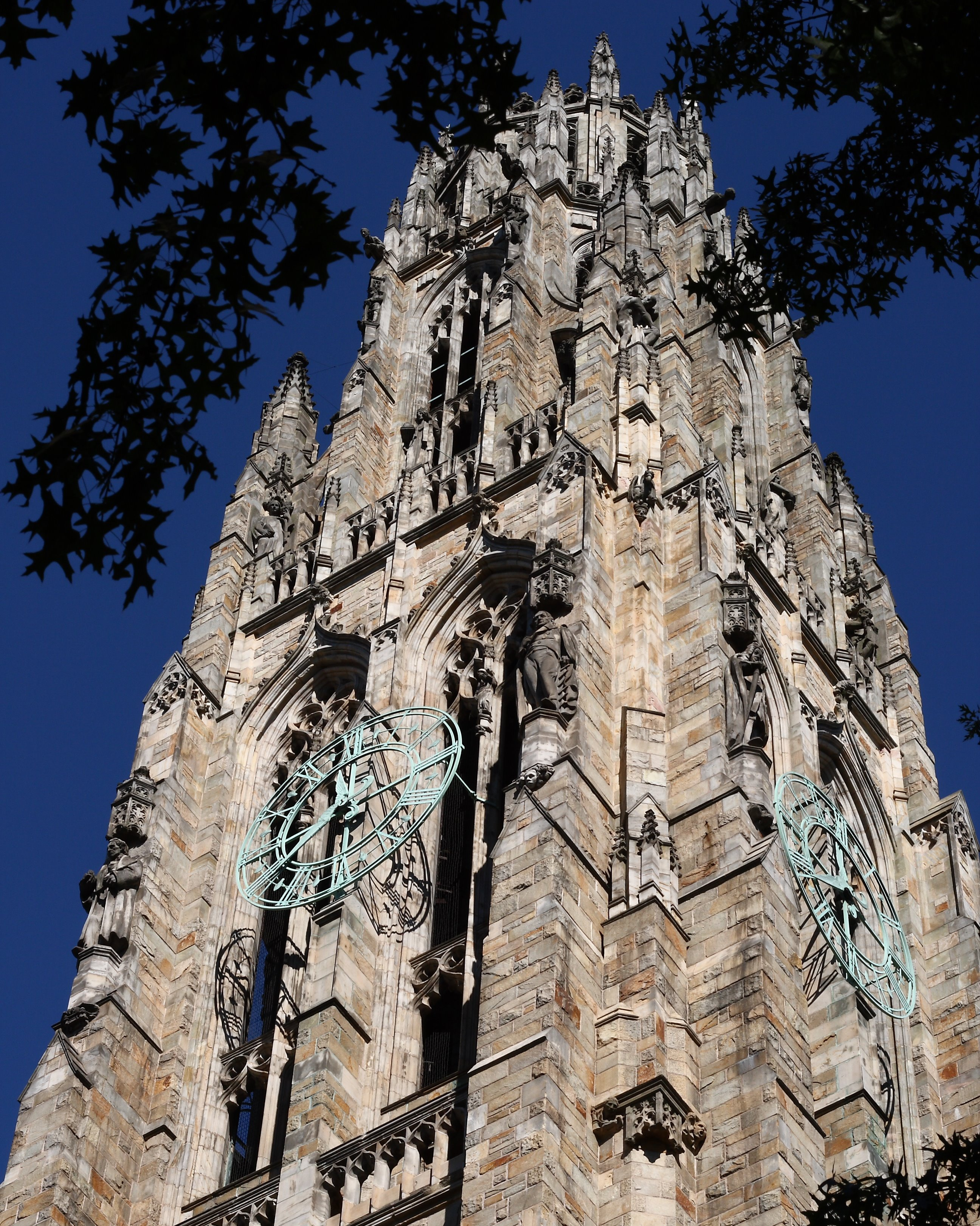
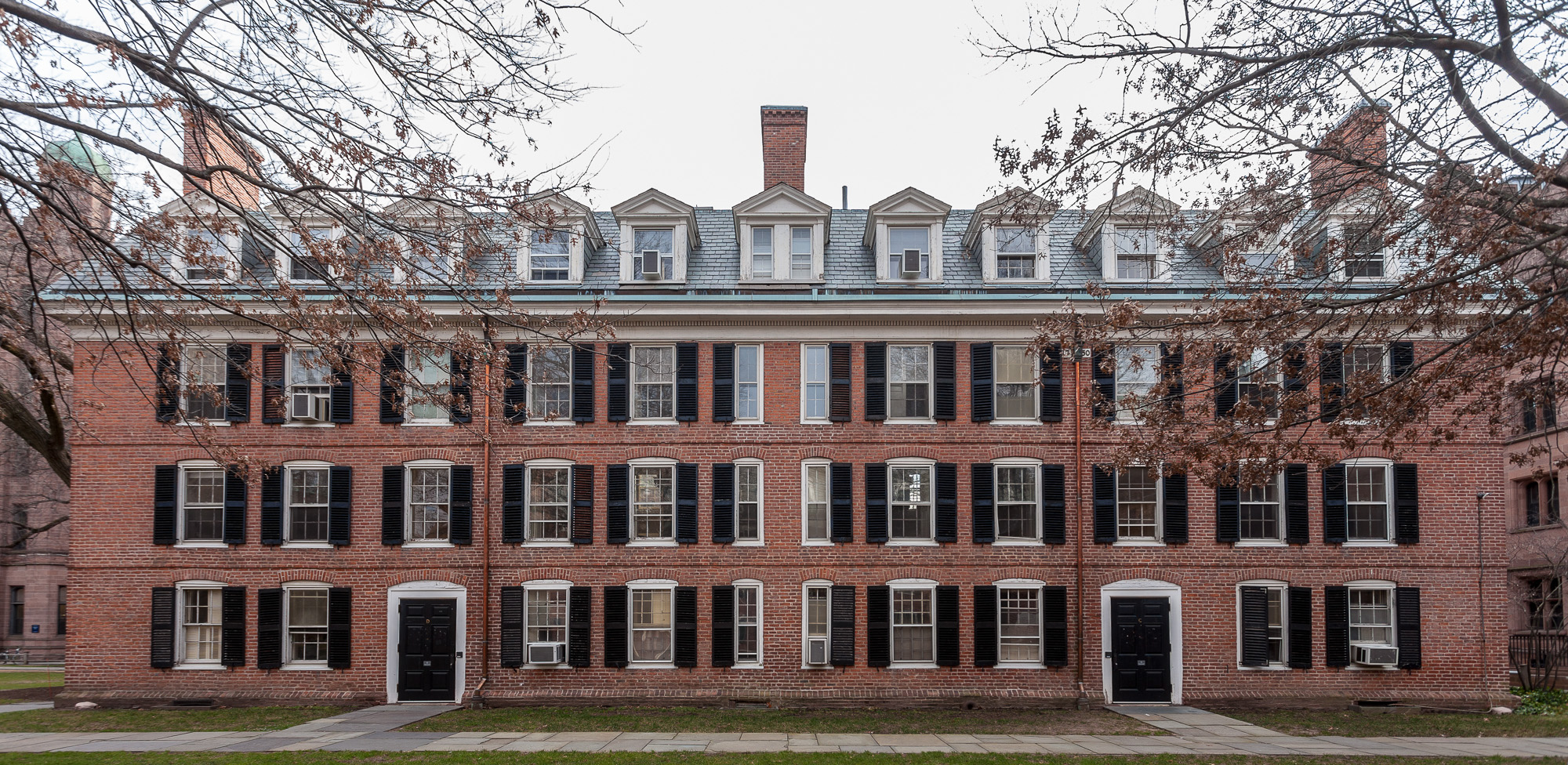
- Downtown East Rock Park New Haven Green Upper State Street Five Mile Point Light Harkness Tower Connecticut Hall at Yale University

- Flag Seal Wordmark
- Nickname: The Elm City
- Coordinates: 41°18′30″N 72°55′30″W
- Country: United States
- U.S. state: Connecticut
- County: New Haven
- Region: South Central Connecticut
- Settled (town): April 3, 1638
- Incorporated (city): 1784
- Consolidated: 1895
- Named for: Natural harbor

Government
  - Type: Mayor–board of aldermen
  - Mayor: Justin Elicker (D)

Area
  - City: 20.14 sq mi (52.15 km^{2})
  - Land: 18.69 sq mi (48.41 km^{2})
  - Water: 1.44 sq mi (3.74 km^{2})
- Elevation: 59 ft (18 m)

Population (2020)
  - City: 134,023
  - Estimate (2025): 138,774
  - Density: 7,170/sq mi (2,768.5/km^{2})
  - Urban: 561,456 (US: 77th)
  - Urban density: 1,884/sq mi (727.4/km^{2})
  - Metro: 576,718 (US: 100th)
- Demonym: New Havener
- Time zone: UTC−5 (Eastern)
  - Summer (DST): UTC−4 (Eastern)
- ZIP Codes: 06501–06540
- Area codes: 203/475
- FIPS code: 09-52000
- GNIS feature ID: 0209231
- Airport: Tweed New Haven Airport
- Website: newhavenct.gov

New Haven is a city in the U.S. state of Connecticut. It is located on New Haven Harbor on the northern shore of Long Island Sound. With a population of 134,023 at the 2020 census, it is the third-most populous city in Connecticut and the largest in the South Central Connecticut Planning Region, with the Greater New Haven metropolitan area having an estimated 577,000 residents.

New Haven was one of the first planned cities in the U.S. A year after its founding by English Puritans in 1638, eight streets were laid out in a three-by-three grid, creating the "Nine Square Plan". The central common block is the New Haven Green, a 16-acre (6 ha) square at the center of Downtown New Haven. The Green is now a National Historic Landmark, and the "Nine Square Plan" is recognized by the American Planning Association as a National Planning Landmark.

New Haven is the home of Yale University, New Haven's biggest taxpayer and employer, and an integral part of the city's economy. Health care, professional and financial services, and retail trade also contribute to the city's economic activity.

The city served as co-capital of Connecticut from 1701 to 1873, when sole governance was transferred to the more centrally located city of Hartford. New Haven has since billed itself as the "Cultural Capital of Connecticut" for its many theaters, museums, and music venues. New Haven had the first public tree planting program in the U.S., producing a canopy of mature trees (including some large elms) that gave the city the nickname "The Elm City".

== History ==
=== Pre-colonial foundation as an independent colony ===
Before Europeans arrived, the New Haven area was the home of the Quinnipiac tribe of Native Americans, who lived in villages around the harbor and sustained an economy of local fisheries and the farming of maize. The area was briefly visited by Dutch explorer Adriaen Block in 1614. Dutch traders set up a small trading system of beaver pelts with the local inhabitants, but trade was sporadic and the Dutch did not settle permanently in the area.

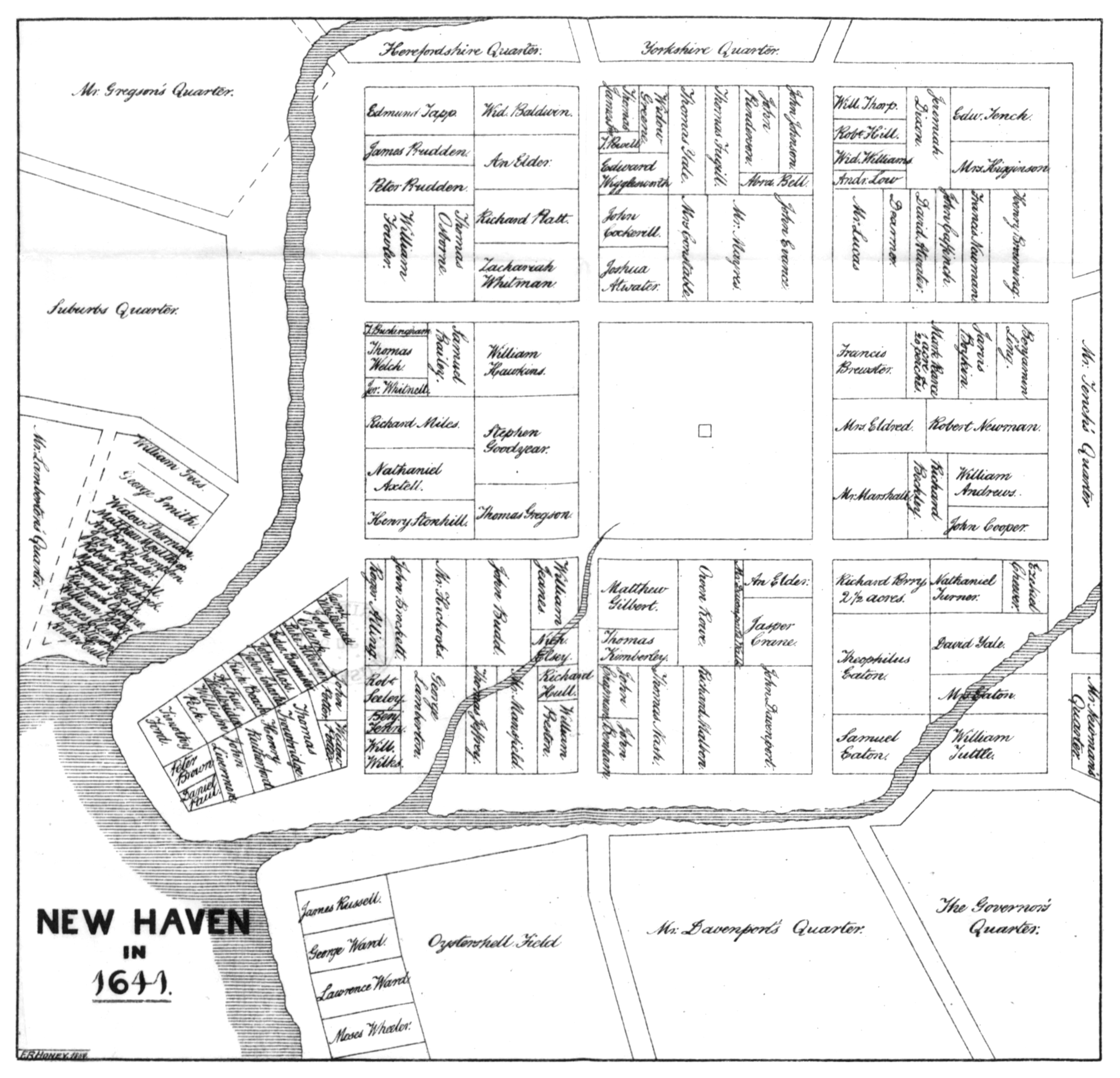
The 1638 nine-square plan, with the extant New Haven Green at its center, continues to define New Haven's downtown.

In 1637, a small party of Puritans did a reconnaissance of the New Haven harbor area and wintered over. In April 1638, the main party of five hundred Puritans, who had left the Massachusetts Bay Colony under the leadership of Reverend John Davenport and London merchant Theophilus Eaton, sailed into the harbor. It was their hope to set up a theological community with the government more closely linked to the church than that in Massachusetts, and to exploit the area's potential as a port. The Quinnipiacs, who were under attack by neighboring Pequots, sold their land to the settlers in return for a pledge of protection.

House of New Haven Founder Theophilus Eaton as it stood at Orange and Elm Streets in the 17th century

By 1640, "Quinnipiac's" theocratic government and nine-square grid plan were in place, and the town was renamed New Haven, with 'haven' meaning harbor or port. However, the area to the north remained Quinnipiac until 1678, when it was renamed Hamden. The settlement became the headquarters of the New Haven Colony, distinct from the Connecticut Colony previously established to the north centering on Hartford. Reflecting its theocratic roots, the New Haven Colony forbade the establishment of other churches, whereas the Connecticut Colony permitted them.

Economic disaster struck New Haven in 1646, when the town sent its first fully loaded ship of local goods (the "Great Shippe") back to England. It never reached its destination, and its disappearance hindered New Haven's development as compared to the rising trade powers of Boston and New Amsterdam (modern day New York City).

In 1660, Colony founder John Davenport's wishes were fulfilled, and Hopkins School was founded in New Haven with money from the estate of Edward Hopkins.

In 1661, the Regicides who had signed the death warrant of Charles I of England were pursued by Charles II. Two of them, Colonel Edward Whalley and Colonel William Goffe, fled to New Haven for refuge. Davenport arranged for them to hide in the West Rock hills northwest of the town. A third judge, John Dixwell, later joined the others. None of the three were ever returned to England for trial; Dixwell died of old age in New Haven, the others likewise elsewhere in New England.

=== As part of the Connecticut Colony ===
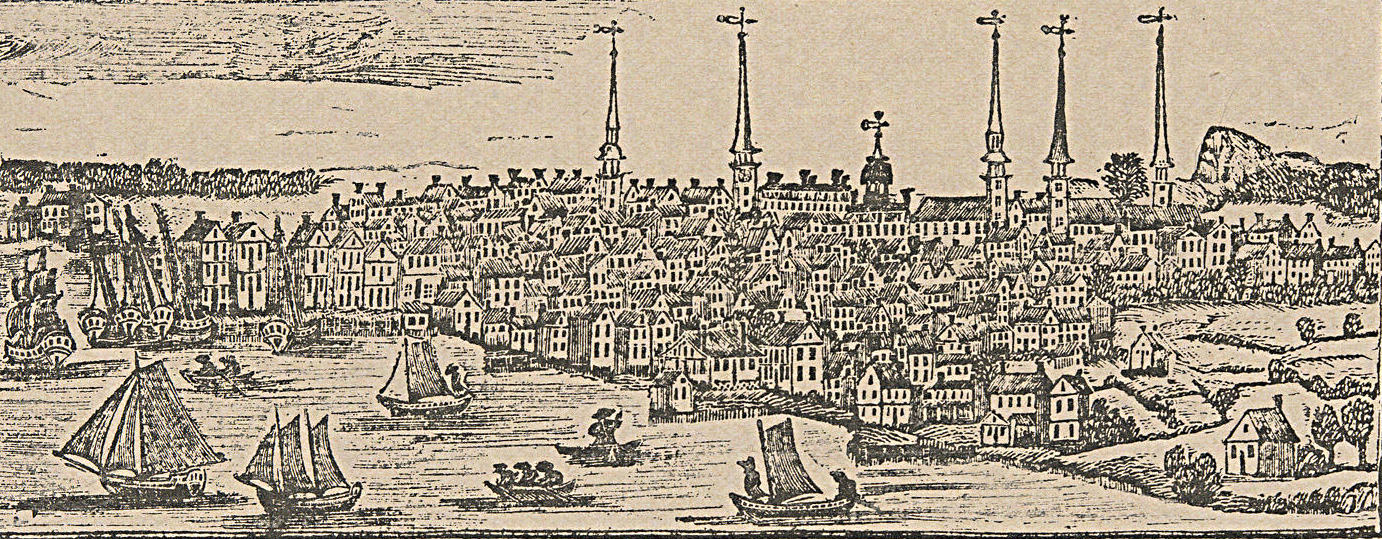
New Haven as it appeared in a 1786 engraving

Second meeting house on the New Haven Green, as it stood from 1670 to 1757

In 1664, New Haven became part of the Connecticut Colony when the two colonies were merged under political pressure from England. Seeking to establish a new theocracy elsewhere, some members of the New Haven Colony went on to establish Newark, New Jersey, as a "new ark" of the Covenant.

New Haven was made co-capital of Connecticut in 1701, a status it retained until 1873.

In 1716, the Collegiate School relocated from Old Saybrook to New Haven, establishing it as a center of learning. In 1718, in response to a large donation from East India Company merchant Elihu Yale, former Governor of Madras, the Collegiate School was renamed Yale College.

For over a century, New Haven citizens had fought in the colonial militia alongside regular British forces, including the French and Indian War. As the American Revolution approached, General David Wooster and other influential residents hoped that the conflict with the British parliament could be resolved short of rebellion. On April 23, 1775, Captain Benedict Arnold commanded the Second Company, Governor's Foot Guard, of New Haven to break into the powder house to arm themselves for a three-day march to Cambridge, Massachusetts, an event still celebrated in New Haven as Powder House Day. Other New Haven militia members were on hand to escort George Washington from his overnight stay in New Haven on his way to Cambridge. Contemporary reports, from both sides, remark on the New Haven volunteers' professional military bearing, including uniforms.

On July 5, 1779, 2,600 loyalists and British regulars under General William Tryon, governor of New York, landed in New Haven Harbor and raided the town of 3,500. A militia of Yale students had been preparing for battle, and former Yale president and Yale Divinity School professor Naphtali Daggett rode out to confront the Redcoats. Yale president Ezra Stiles recounted in his diary that while he moved furniture in anticipation of battle, he still couldn't quite believe the revolution had begun. New Haven was not torched as the invaders did with Danbury in 1777, or Fairfield and Norwalk a week after the New Haven raid, preserving many of the town's colonial features.

=== Post-colonial period and industrialization ===
New Haven was incorporated as a city in 1784, and Roger Sherman, one of the signers of the Constitution and author of the "Connecticut Compromise", became the new city's first mayor.

Towns created from the original New Haven Colony
New town	Split from	Incorporated
Wallingford	New Haven	1670
Cheshire	Wallingford	1780
Meriden	Wallingford	1806
Branford	New Haven	1685
North Branford	Branford	1831
Woodbridge	New Haven and Milford	1784
Bethany	Woodbridge	1832
East Haven	New Haven	1785
Hamden	New Haven	1786
North Haven	New Haven	1786
Orange	New Haven and Milford	1822
West Haven	Orange	1921

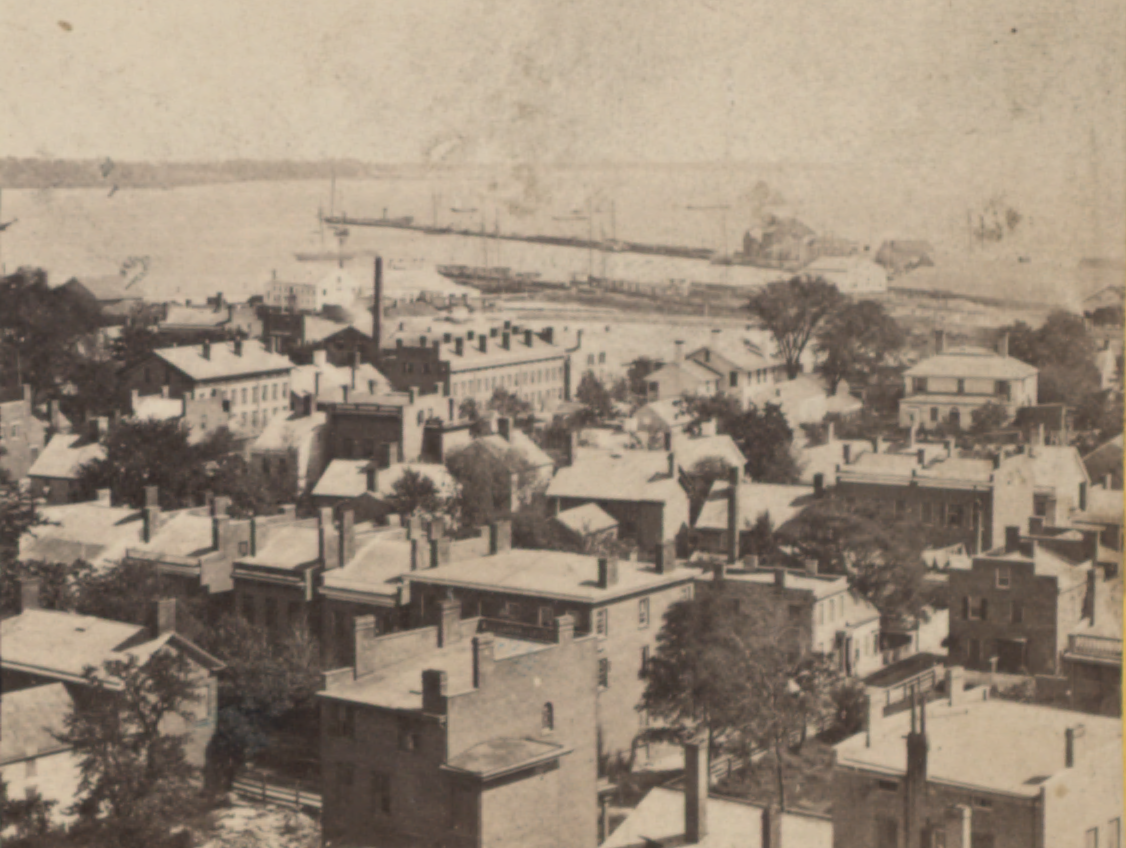
New Haven's harbor and long wharf as seen from Depot Tower, c. 1849

The city struck fortune in the late 18th century with the inventions and industrial activity of Eli Whitney, a Yale graduate who remained in New Haven to develop the cotton gin and establish a gun-manufacturing factory in the northern part of the city near the Hamden town line. That area is still known as Whitneyville, and the main road through both towns is known as Whitney Avenue. The factory is now the Eli Whitney Museum, which has a particular emphasis on activities for children and exhibits pertaining to the A. C. Gilbert Company. His factory, along with that of Simeon North, and the lively clock-making and brass hardware sectors, contributed to making early Connecticut a powerful manufacturing economy; so many arms manufacturers sprang up that the state became known as "The Arsenal of America". It was in Whitney's gun-manufacturing plant that Samuel Colt invented the automatic revolver in 1836. Many other talented machinists and firearms designers would go on to found successful firearms manufacturing companies in New Haven, including Oliver Winchester and O.F. Mossberg & Sons.

The Farmington Canal, created in the early 19th century, was a short-lived transporter of goods into the interior regions of Connecticut and Massachusetts, and ran from New Haven to Northampton, Massachusetts.

New Haven was to be the site of the first college for African Americans in the United States, but the plan was obstructed by efforts led by Yale Law School founder and former New Haven Mayor David Daggett, who went on to serve as a U.S. Senator and judge on Connecticut's highest court. Daggett denigrated African Americans, denied they were citizens, and presided over the trial of a woman persecuted for trying to admit an African American girl to her boarding school and, having that effort blocked, running a boarding school for African American girls.

New Haven was home to one of the important early events in the burgeoning anti-slavery movement when, in 1839, the trial of mutineering Mende tribesmen being transported as slaves on the Spanish slave ship Amistad was held in New Haven's United States District Court. There is a statue of Joseph Cinqué, the informal leader of the slaves, beside City Hall. See "Museums" below for more information. Abraham Lincoln delivered a speech on slavery in New Haven in 1860, shortly before he secured the Republican nomination for President.

The American Civil War boosted the local economy with wartime purchases of industrial goods, including that of the New Haven Arms Company, which would later become the Winchester Repeating Arms Company. (Winchester would continue to produce arms in New Haven until 2006, and many of the buildings that were a part of the Winchester plant are now a part of the Winchester Repeating Arms Company Historic District). After the war, population grew and doubled by the start of the 20th century, most notably due to the influx of immigrants from southern Europe, particularly Italy. Today, roughly half the populations of East Haven, West Haven, and North Haven are Italian-American. Jewish immigration to New Haven has left an enduring mark on the city. Westville was the center of Jewish life in New Haven, though today many have fanned out to suburban communities such as Woodbridge and Cheshire. Lowell House, the city's first settlement, opened in 1900.

=== Post-industrial era and urban redevelopment ===
New Haven's expansion continued during the two World Wars, with most new inhabitants being African Americans from the American South, and Puerto Ricans. The city reached its peak population after World War II. The area of New Haven is only 17 square miles (44 km^{2}), encouraging further development of new housing after 1950 in adjacent, suburban towns. Moreover, as in other U.S. cities in the 1950s, New Haven began to suffer white flight of middle-class workers. One author suggested that aggressive redlining and rezoning made it difficult for residents to obtain financing for older, deteriorating urban housing stock, thereby condemning such structures to deterioration.

In 1954, then-mayor Richard C. Lee began some of the earliest major urban renewal projects in the United States. Certain sections of downtown New Haven were redeveloped to include museums, new office towers, a hotel, and large shopping complexes. Other parts of the city, particularly the Wooster Square and Fair Haven neighborhoods were affected by the construction of Interstate 95 along the Long Wharf section, Interstate 91, and the Oak Street Connector. The Oak Street Connector (Route 34), running between Interstate 95, downtown, and The Hill neighborhood, was originally intended as a highway to the city's western suburbs but was only completed as a highway to the downtown area, with the area to the west becoming a boulevard (See "Redevelopment" below).

In 1970, a series of criminal prosecutions against various members of the Black Panther Party took place in New Haven, inciting mass protests on the New Haven Green involving twelve thousand demonstrators and many well-known New Left political activists. (See "Political Culture" below for more information). From the 1960s through the early 1990s, some areas of New Haven continued to decline both economically and in terms of population despite attempts to resurrect certain neighborhoods through renewal projects. In conjunction with its declining population, New Haven experienced a steep rise in its crime rate.

Since approximately 2000, many parts of downtown New Haven have been revitalized with new restaurants, nightlife, and small retail stores. In particular, the area surrounding the New Haven Green has experienced an influx of apartments and condominiums. In addition, two new supermarkets opened to serve downtown's growing residential population: a Stop and Shop opened just west of downtown, while Elm City Market, located one block from the Green, opened in 2011. The recent turnaround of downtown New Haven has received positive press from various periodicals.

Major projects include the current construction of a new campus for Gateway Community College downtown, and also a 32-story, 500-unit apartment/retail building called 360 State Street. The 360 State Street project is now occupied and is the largest residential building in Connecticut. A new boathouse and dock is planned for New Haven Harbor, and the linear park Farmington Canal Trail is set to extend into downtown New Haven within the coming year. Additionally, foundation and ramp work to widen I-95 to create a new harbor crossing for New Haven, with an extradosed bridge to replace the 1950s-era Q Bridge, has begun. The city still hopes to redevelop the site of the New Haven Coliseum, which was demolished in 2007.

In April 2009, the United States Supreme Court agreed to hear a suit over reverse discrimination brought by 18 white firefighters against the city. The suit involved the 2003 promotion test for the New Haven Fire Department. After the tests were scored, no black firefighters scored high enough to qualify for consideration for promotion, so the city announced that no one would be promoted. In the subsequent Ricci v. DeStefano decision the court found 5–4 that New Haven's decision to ignore the test results violated Title VII of the Civil Rights Act of 1964. As a result, a district court subsequently ordered the city to promote 14 of the white firefighters.

In 2010 and 2011, state and federal funds were awarded to Connecticut (and Massachusetts) to construct the Hartford Line, with a southern terminus at New Haven's Union Station and a northern terminus at Springfield's Union Station. According to the White House, "This corridor [currently] has one train per day connecting communities in Connecticut and Massachusetts to the Northeast Corridor and Vermont. The vision for this corridor is to restore the alignment to its original route via the Knowledge Corridor in western Massachusetts, improving trip time and increasing the population base that can be served." Set for construction in 2013, the "Knowledge Corridor high speed intercity passenger rail" project will cost approximately $1 billion, and the ultimate northern terminus for the project is reported to be Montreal in Canada. Train speeds between will reportedly exceed 110 miles per hour (180 km/h) and increase both cities' rail traffic exponentially.

=== Timeline of notable firsts ===
- 1638: New Haven becomes the first planned city in America.
- 1776: Yale student David Bushnell invents the first American submarine.
- 1787: John Fitch builds the first steamboat.
- 1836: Samuel Colt invents the automatic revolver in Whitney's factory.
- 1839: Charles Goodyear of New Haven discovers the process of vulcanizing rubber in Woburn, Massachusetts, and later perfects it and patents the process in nearby Springfield, Massachusetts.
- 1860: Philios P. Blake patents the first corkscrew.
- 1877: New Haven hosts the first Bell PSTN (telephone) switch office.
- 1878–1880: The District Telephone Company of New Haven creates the world's first telephone exchange and the first telephone directory and installs the first public phone. The company expanded and became the Connecticut Telephone Company, then the Southern New England Telephone Company (now part of AT&T).
- 1882: The Knights of Columbus are founded in New Haven. The city still serves as the world headquarters of the organization, which maintains a museum downtown.
- 1892: Local confectioner George C. Smith of the Bradley Smith Candy Co. invents the first lollipops.
- Late 19th century-early 20th century: The first public tree planting program takes place in New Haven, at the urging of native James Hillhouse.
- 1900: Louis Lassen, owner of Louis' Lunch, is credited with inventing the hamburger, as well as the steak sandwich.
- 1911: The Erector Set, the popular and culturally important construction toy, is invented in New Haven by A.C. Gilbert. It was manufactured by the A. C. Gilbert Company at Erector Square from 1913 until the company's bankruptcy in 1967.
- 1920: In competition with competing explanations, the Frisbee is said to have originated on the Yale campus, based on the tin pans of the Frisbie Pie Company which were tossed around by students on the New Haven Green.
- 1977: The first memorial to victims of the Holocaust on public land in America stands in New Haven's Edgewood Park at the corner of Whalley and West Park avenues. It was built with funds collected from the community and is maintained by Greater New Haven Holocaust Memory, Inc. The ashes of victims killed and cremated at Auschwitz are buried under the memorial.

== Geography ==
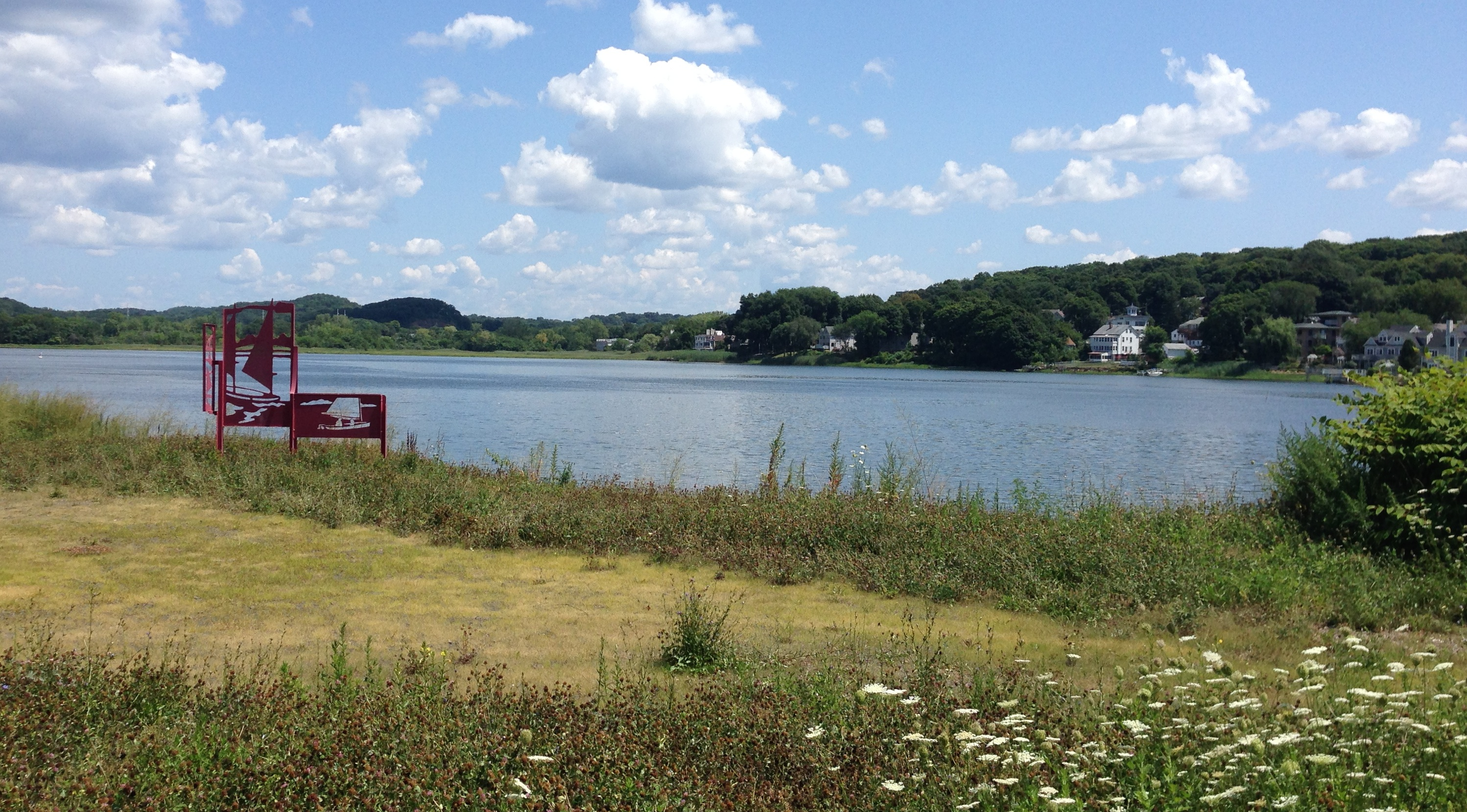
View of the Quinnipiac River from Fair Haven

According to the United States Census Bureau, the city has a total area of 20.1 square miles (52.1 km^{2}), of which 18.7 square miles (48.4 km^{2}) is land and 1.4 square miles (3.7 km^{2}), or 6.67%, is water.

New Haven's best-known geographic features are its large, shallow harbor, and two reddish basalt trap rock ridges which rise to the northeast and northwest of the city core. These trap rocks are known respectively as East Rock and West Rock, and both serve as extensive parks. West Rock has been tunneled through to make way for the east–west passage of the Wilbur Cross Parkway (the only highway tunnel through a natural obstacle in Connecticut), and once served as the hideout of the "Regicides" (see: Regicides Trail). Most New Haveners refer to these men as "The Three Judges". East Rock features the prominent Soldiers and Sailors war monument on its peak as well as the "Great/Giant Steps" which run up the rock's cliffside.

The city is drained by three rivers; the West, Mill, and Quinnipiac, named in order from west to east. The West River discharges into West Haven Harbor, while the Mill and Quinnipiac rivers discharge into New Haven Harbor. Both harbors are embayments of Long Island Sound. In addition, several smaller streams flow through the city's neighborhoods, including Wintergreen Brook, the Beaver Ponds Outlet, Wilmot Brook, Belden Brook, and Prospect Creek. Not all of these small streams have continuous flow year-round.

=== Climate ===
According to the Köppen classification, New Haven experiences a bordering a hot-summer humid continental climate (Dfa), bordering on a humid subtropical climate (Cfa). The city has hot, humid summers and cool to cold winters. From May to late September, the weather is typically hot and humid, with average temperatures exceeding 80 °F (27 °C) on 70 days per year. In summer, the Bermuda High creates as southern flow of warm and humid air, with frequent (but brief) thundershowers. October to early December is normally mild to cool late in the season, while early spring (April) can be cool to warm. Winters are more variable, with cool to cold temperatures, mixed with warmer spells, with both rain and snow fall.

While the weather patterns that affect New Haven result from a primarily offshore direction, thus reducing the marine influence of Long Island Sound, the location on Long Island Sound often influences the weather along the coastline compared to inland. During summer heat waves, temperatures may reach 95 °F (35 °C) or higher on occasion with heat-index values of over 100 °F (38 °C). Tropical cyclones have struck New Haven in the past, including 1938 Hurricane (Long Island Express), Hurricane Carol in 1954, Hurricane Gloria in 1985. The hardiness zone is 7a.

Climate data for New Haven (HVN), Connecticut, elevation: 4 m or 13 ft, 1991–2020 normals, extremes 1948–present
Month	Jan	Feb	Mar	Apr	May	Jun	Jul	Aug	Sep	Oct	Nov	Dec	Year
Record high °F (°C)	69 (21)	68 (20)	77 (25)	88 (31)	95 (35)	96 (36)	101 (38)	100 (38)	93 (34)	89 (32)	80 (27)	65 (18)	101 (38)
Mean maximum °F (°C)	56.4 (13.6)	54.8 (12.7)	64.4 (18.0)	76.9 (24.9)	82.7 (28.2)	88.4 (31.3)	91.1 (32.8)	90.0 (32.2)	86.1 (30.1)	77.8 (25.4)	68.3 (20.2)	59.3 (15.2)	92.1 (33.4)
Mean daily maximum °F (°C)	38.1 (3.4)	40.2 (4.6)	47.0 (8.3)	57.8 (14.3)	67.7 (19.8)	76.4 (24.7)	82.1 (27.8)	81.0 (27.2)	74.7 (23.7)	63.8 (17.7)	53.4 (11.9)	43.7 (6.5)	60.5 (15.8)
Daily mean °F (°C)	30.5 (−0.8)	32.0 (0.0)	38.5 (3.6)	48.5 (9.2)	58.5 (14.7)	67.9 (19.9)	73.9 (23.3)	72.9 (22.7)	66.0 (18.9)	54.7 (12.6)	44.7 (7.1)	36.3 (2.4)	52.0 (11.1)
Mean daily minimum °F (°C)	23.0 (−5.0)	23.9 (−4.5)	30.1 (−1.1)	39.3 (4.1)	49.4 (9.7)	59.3 (15.2)	65.7 (18.7)	64.7 (18.2)	57.3 (14.1)	45.5 (7.5)	35.9 (2.2)	28.9 (−1.7)	43.9 (6.6)
Mean minimum °F (°C)	4.8 (−15.1)	8.9 (−12.8)	15.8 (−9.0)	27.5 (−2.5)	37.7 (3.2)	47.7 (8.7)	56.9 (13.8)	54.1 (12.3)	45.0 (7.2)	30.7 (−0.7)	21.8 (−5.7)	14.5 (−9.7)	6.2 (−14.3)
Record low °F (°C)	−8 (−22)	−6 (−21)	1 (−17)	17 (−8)	30 (−1)	40 (4)	50 (10)	43 (6)	34 (1)	23 (−5)	13 (−11)	−3 (−19)	−8 (−22)
Average precipitation inches (mm)	2.72 (69)	2.84 (72)	3.66 (93)	4.19 (106)	3.54 (90)	3.47 (88)	3.36 (85)	3.55 (90)	4.03 (102)	3.78 (96)	3.12 (79)	3.53 (90)	41.79 (1,061)
Average snowfall inches (cm)	9.0 (23)	9.8 (25)	7.2 (18)	1.0 (2.5)	0.0 (0.0)	0.0 (0.0)	0.0 (0.0)	0.0 (0.0)	0.0 (0.0)	0.1 (0.25)	1.1 (2.8)	7.2 (18)	35.4 (89.55)
Average precipitation days (≥ 0.01 in)	9.5	8.5	9.6	10.9	12.9	11.8	10.4	9.9	9.3	11.1	9.4	11.0	124.3
Average snowy days (≥ 0.1 in)	5.9	5.9	4.5	0.7	0.0	0.0	0.0	0.0	0.0	0.1	0.7	4.4	22.2
Average relative humidity (%)	62.8	60.3	64.4	65.1	69.7	73.8	74.2	73.8	74.1	70.4	68.2	63.6	68.4
Average ultraviolet index	2	2	4	6	7	8	8	8	6	4	2	1	5
Source 1: NOAA (snow/snow days 1948–1974)
Source 2: Weatherbase (humidity), Weather Atlas (UV index)

=== Streetscape ===
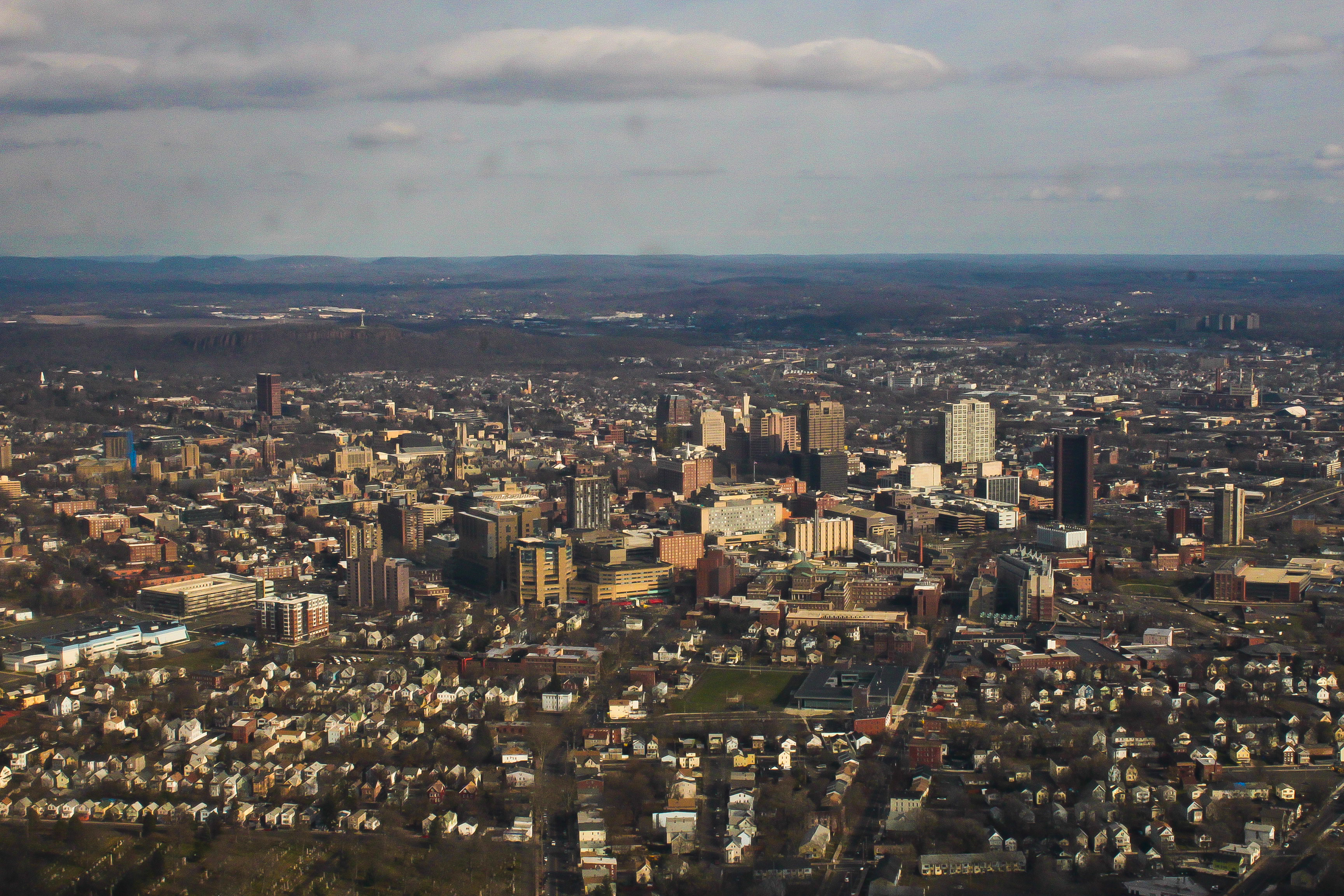
The city from the south with The Hill in the foreground. East Rock is visible in the background.

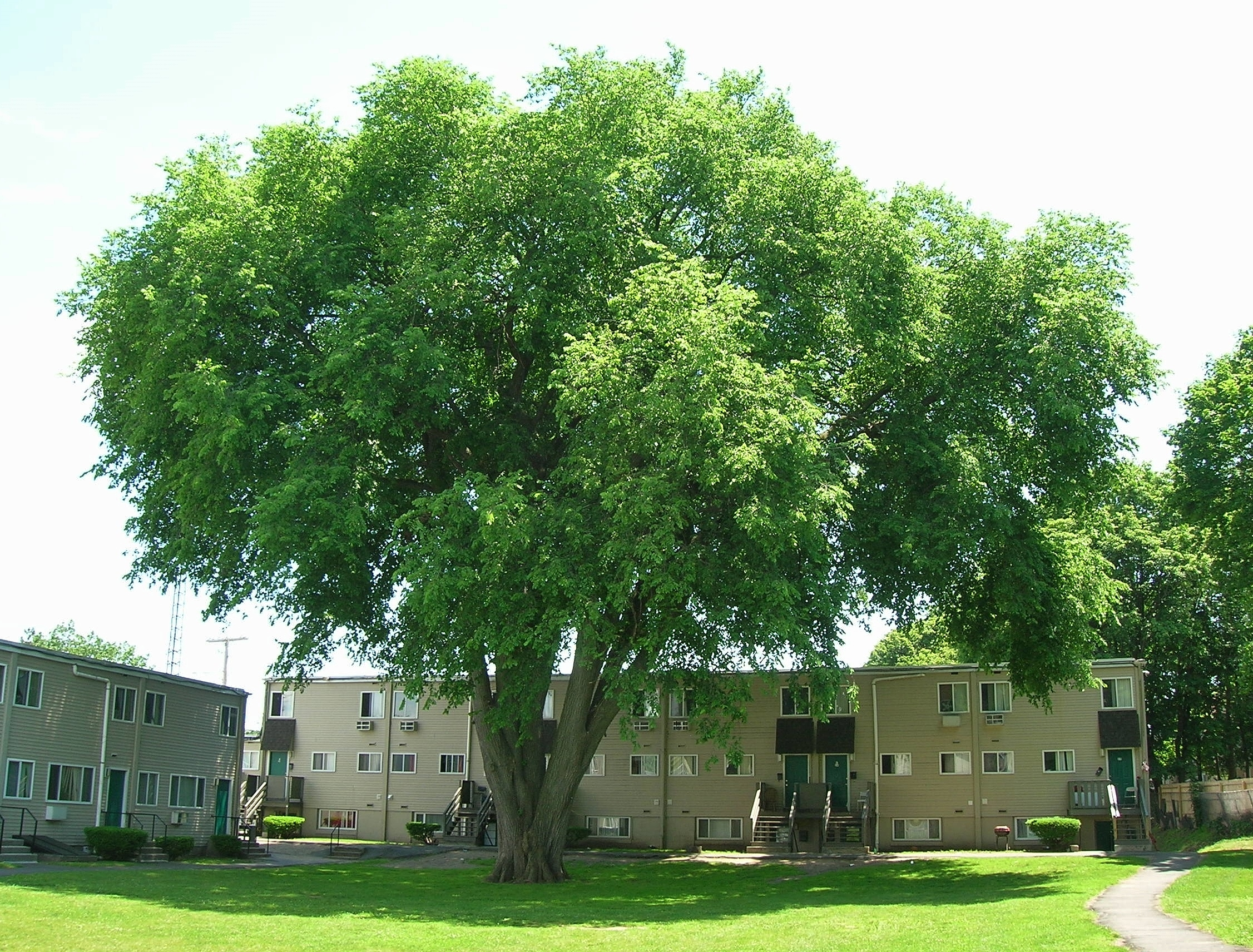
American elm in New Haven

New Haven has a long tradition of urban planning and a purposeful design for the city's layout. The city could be argued to have some of the first preconceived layouts in the country. Upon founding, New Haven was laid out in a grid plan of nine square blocks; the central square was left open, in the tradition of many New England towns, as the city green (a commons area). The city also instituted the first public tree planting program in America. As in other cities, many of the elms that gave New Haven the nickname "Elm City" perished in the mid-20th century due to Dutch elm disease, although many have since been replanted. The New Haven Green is currently home to three separate historic churches which speak to the original theocratic nature of the city. The Green remains the social center of the city today. It was named a National Historic Landmark in 1970.

Downtown New Haven, occupied by nearly 7,000 residents, has a more residential character than most downtowns. The downtown area provides about half of the city's jobs and half of its tax base and in recent years has become filled with dozens of new upscale restaurants, in addition to shops and thousands of apartments and condominium units which subsequently help overall growth of the city.

=== Neighborhoods ===
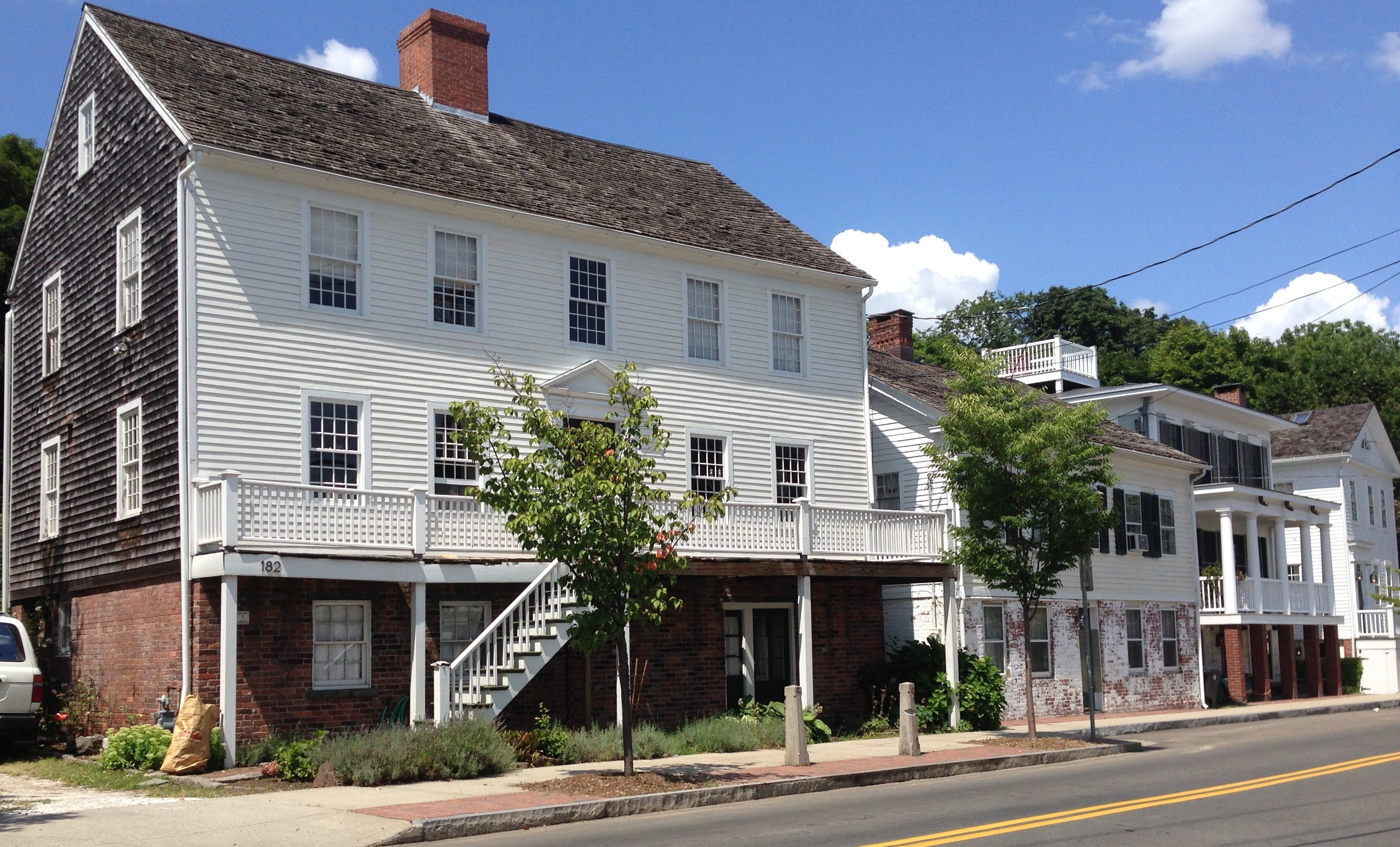
The Quinnipiac River Historic District, located in the Fair Haven neighborhood, is one of dozens of listed historic districts in New Haven.

The city has many distinct neighborhoods. In addition to Downtown, centered on the central business district and the Green, are the following neighborhoods: the west central neighborhoods of Dixwell and Dwight; the southern neighborhoods of The Hill, historic water-front City Point (or Oyster Point), and the harborside district of Long Wharf; the western neighborhoods of Beaver Hills, Edgewood, West River, Westville, Amity, and West Rock-Westhills; East Rock, Cedar Hill, Prospect Hill, and Newhallville in the northern side of town; the east central neighborhoods of Mill River and Wooster Square, an Italian-American neighborhood; Fair Haven, an immigrant community located between the Mill and Quinnipiac rivers; Quinnipiac Meadows and Fair Haven Heights across the Quinnipiac River; and facing the eastern side of the harbor, The Annex and East Shore (or Morris Cove).

== Demographics ==
=== Census data ===
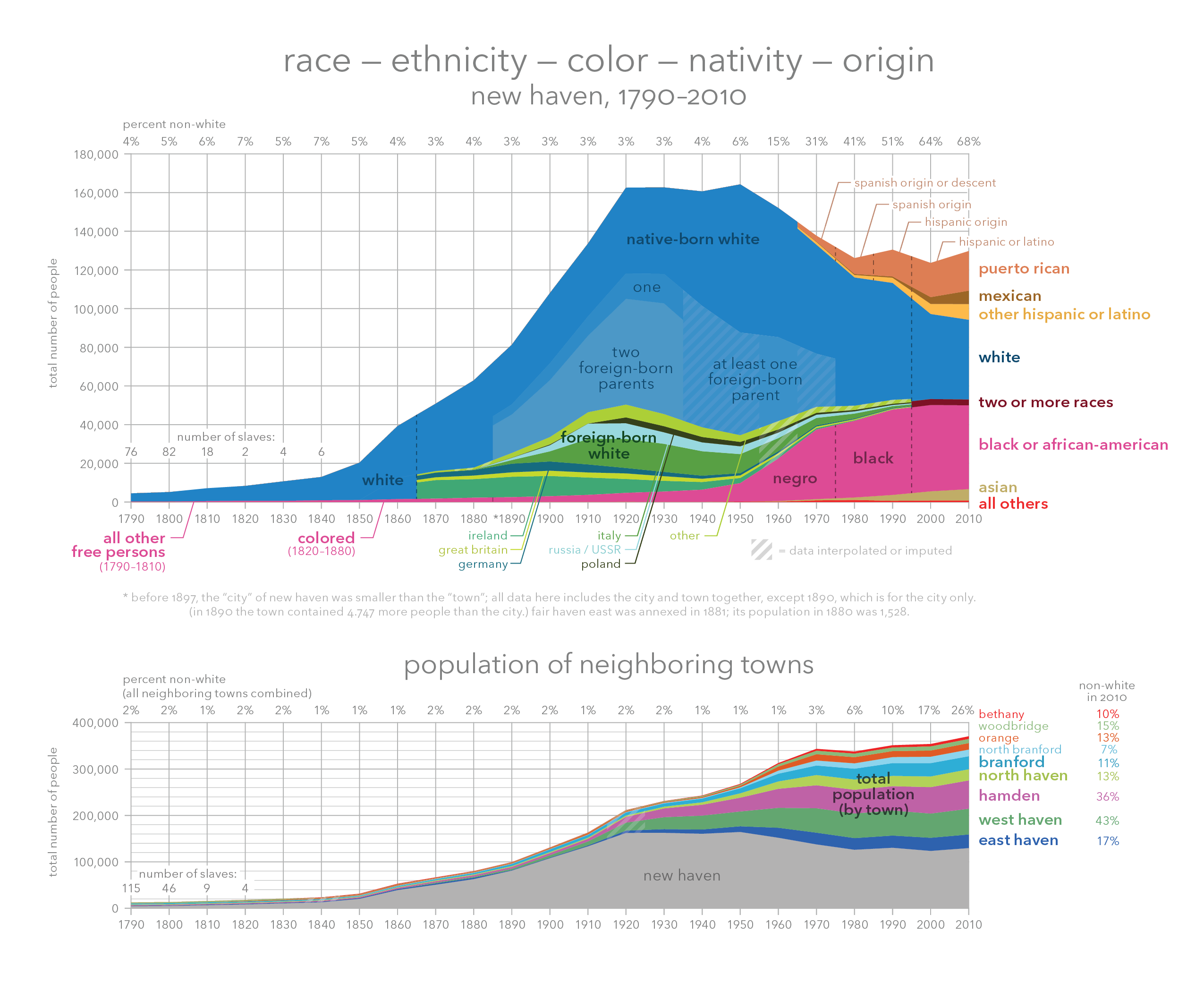
Graph of New Haven demographics from the US Census, 1790–2010

Historical population
Year	Pop.	±%
1756	5,085	—
1774	8,295	+63.1%
1790	4,487	−45.9%
1800	4,049	−9.8%
1810	5,772	+42.6%
1820	7,147	+23.8%
1830	10,180	+42.4%
1840	12,960	+27.3%
1850	20,345	+57.0%
1860	39,267	+93.0%
1870	50,840	+29.5%
1880	62,882	+23.7%
1890	86,045	+36.8%
1900	108,027	+25.5%
1910	133,605	+23.7%
1920	162,537	+21.7%
1930	162,665	+0.1%
1940	160,605	−1.3%
1950	164,443	+2.4%
1960	152,048	−7.5%
1970	137,707	−9.4%
1980	126,021	−8.5%
1990	130,474	+3.5%
2000	123,626	−5.2%
2010	129,779	+5.0%
2020	134,023	+3.3%
2025 est.	138,774	+3.5%
Source: U.S. Decennial Census; Connecticut Census 1756 & 1774; 2025 Estimate

New Haven, Connecticut – Racial and ethnic composition Note: the US Census treats Hispanic/Latino as an ethnic category. This table excludes Latinos from the racial categories and assigns them to a separate category. Hispanics/Latinos may be of any race.
Race / Ethnicity (NH = Non-Hispanic)	Pop 2000	Pop 2010	Pop 2020	% 2000	% 2010	% 2020
White alone (NH)	43,979	41,230	37,010	35.57%	31.77%	27.61%
Black or African American alone (NH)	44,598	43,332	40,788	36.07%	33.39%	30.43%
Native American or Alaska Native alone (NH)	348	379	339	0.28%	0.29%	0.25%
Asian alone (NH)	4,776	5,864	9,044	3.86%	4.52%	6.75%
Pacific Islander alone (NH)	47	34	61	0.04%	0.03%	0.05%
Some Other Race alone (NH)	408	415	873	0.33%	0.32%	0.65%
Mixed Race or Multi-Racial (NH)	3,027	2,934	4,840	2.45%	2.26%	3.61%
Hispanic or Latino (any race)	26,443	35,591	41,068	21.39%	27.42%	30.64%
Total	123,626	129,779	134,023	100.00%	100.00%	100.00%

The U.S. Census Bureau reports a 2010 population of 129,779, with 47,094 households and 25,854 families within the city of New Haven. The population density was 6,859.8 inhabitants per square mile (2,648.6/km^{2}). There were 52,941 housing units at an average density of 2,808.5 per square mile (1,084.4/km^{2}). The racial makeup of the city was 42.6% White, 35.4% African American, 0.5% Native American, 4.6% Asian, 0.1% Pacific Islander, 12.9% from other races, and 3.9% from two or more races. Hispanic or Latino residents of any race were 27.4% of the population. Non-Hispanic whites were 31.8% of the population in 2010, down from 69.6% in 1970. The city's Latino population is growing rapidly. Previous influxes among ethnic groups have been African-Americans in the postwar era, and Irish, Italian and (to a lesser degree) Slavic peoples in the prewar period.

By the 2020 census, its population was 134,023; its racial and ethnic makeup was 27.61% non-Hispanic white, 30.43% Black or African American, 0.25% Native American or Alaska Native, 6.75% Asian, 0.05% Pacific Islander, 0.65% some other race, 3.61% multiracial, and 30.64% Hispanic or Latino of any race.

As of the 2010 census, of the 47,094 households, 29.3% had children under the age of 18 living with them, 27.5% include married couples living together, 22.9% had a female householder with no husband present, and 45.1% were non-families. 36.1% of all households were made up of individuals, and 10.5% had someone living alone who was 65 years of age or older. The average household size was 2.40 and the average family size 3.19.

The ages of New Haven's residents were 25.4% under the age of 18, 16.4% from 18 to 24, 31.2% from 25 to 44, 16.7% from 45 to 64, and 10.2% who were 65 years of age or older. The median age was 29 years, which was significantly lower than the national average. There were 91.8 males per 100 females. For every 100 females age 18 and over, there were 87.6 males.

The median income for a household in the city was $29,604, and the median income for a family was $35,950. Median income for males was $33,605, compared with $28,424 for females. The per capita income for the city was $16,393. About 20.5% of families and 24.4% of the population were living below the poverty line, including 32.2% of those under age 18 and 17.9% of those age 65 or over.

=== Other data ===
It is estimated that 14% of New Haven residents are pedestrian commuters, ranking it number four by highest percentage in the United States. This is primarily due to New Haven's small area and the presence of Yale University.

New Haven is noted for having the highest percentage of Italian American residents of any US city, and is noted for its local style of pizza.

A study of the demographics of the New Haven metro area, based on age, educational attainment, and race and ethnicity, found that they were the closest of any American city to the national average.

== Economy ==
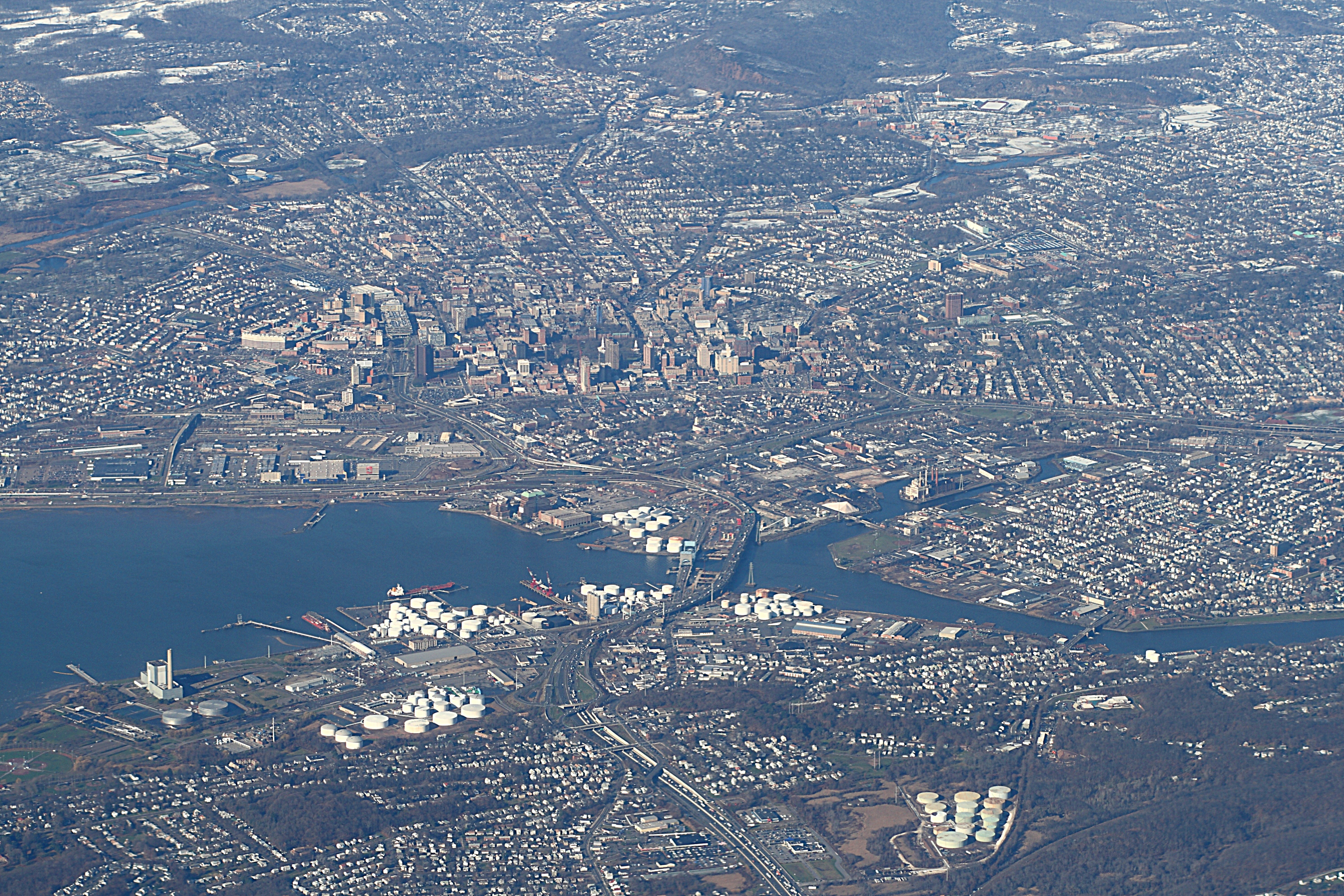
The Port of New Haven

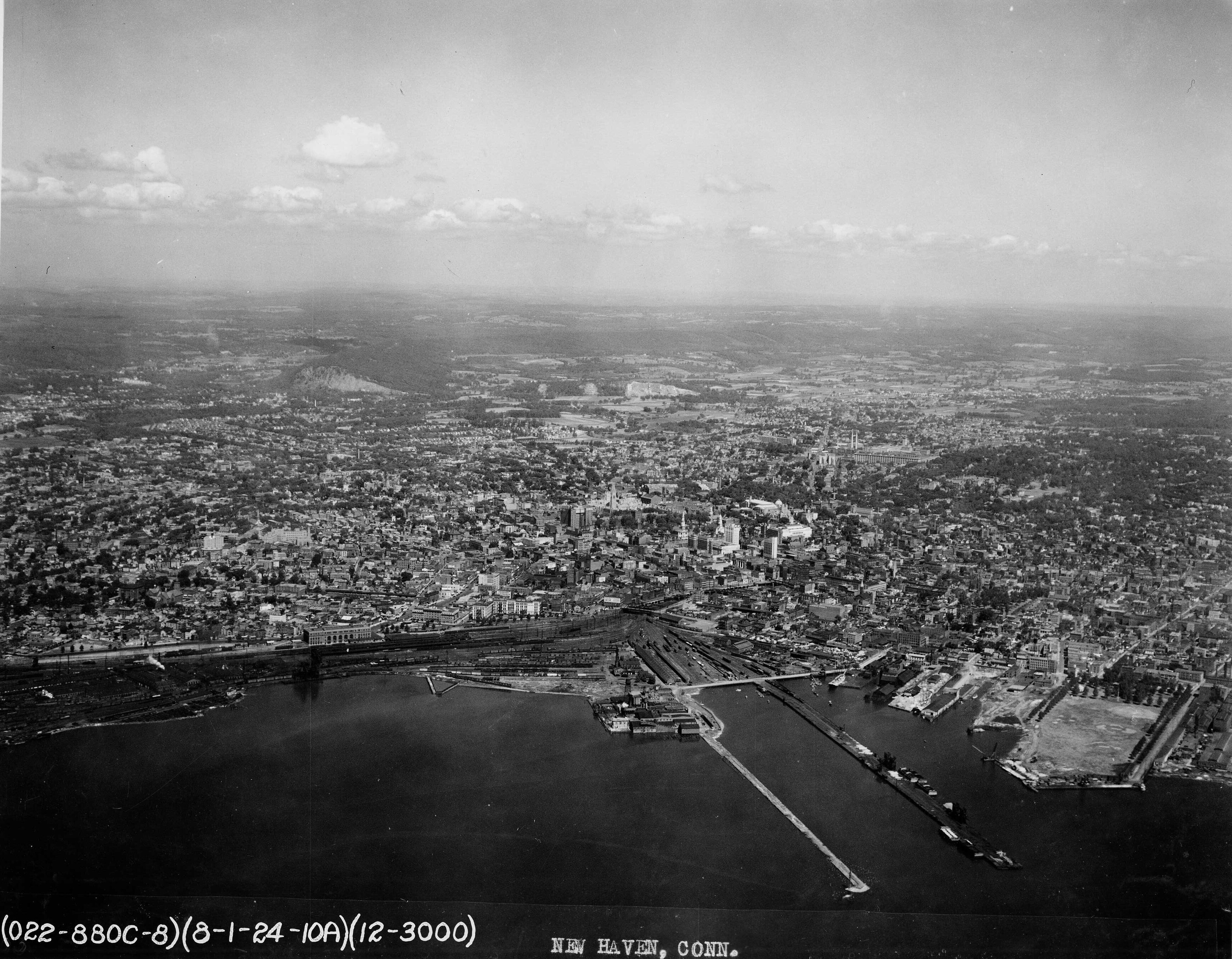
Port in the 1930s

New Haven's economy originally was based in manufacturing, but the postwar period brought rapid industrial decline; the entire Northeast was affected, and medium-sized cities with large working-class populations, like New Haven, were hit particularly hard. Simultaneously, the growth and expansion of Yale University further affected the economic shift. Today, over half (56%) of the city's economy is now made up of services, in particular education and health care; Yale is the city's largest employer, followed by Yale – New Haven Hospital. Other large employers include Southern Connecticut State University, Assa Abloy lock manufacturing, the Knights of Columbus headquarters, Higher One, Alexion Pharmaceuticals, Covidien and United Illuminating. Clothing stores Gant and Ann Taylor were founded in the city.

In 2017, New Haven was ranked by a Verizon study as one of the top 10 cities in America for launching tech startups, and top two in New England.

Industry sectors: Agriculture (.6%), Construction and Mining (4.9%), Manufacturing (2.9%), Transportation and Utilities (2.9%), Trade (21.7%), Finance and Real Estate (7.1%), Services (55.9%), Government (4.0%)

=== Headquarters ===
The Knights of Columbus, the world's largest Catholic fraternal service organization and a Fortune 1000 company, is headquartered in New Haven. Amphenol, based in Greater New Haven (Wallingford), is a Fortune 100 company. Eight Courant 100 companies are based in Greater New Haven, with four headquartered in New Haven proper. New Haven-based companies publicly listed include NewAlliance Bank, the second largest bank in Connecticut and fourth-largest in New England (NYSE: NAL), Higher One Holdings (NYSE: ONE), a financial services firm, United Illuminating, the electricity distributor for southern Connecticut (NYSE: UIL), and Transpro Inc. (AMEX: TPR). The American division of Assa Abloy (one of the world's leading manufacturers of locks) is located in the city. The Southern New England Telephone Company (SNET) began operations in the city as the District Telephone Company of New Haven in 1878; the company remains headquartered in New Haven as a subsidiary of Frontier Communications and provides telephone service for all but two municipalities in Connecticut. SeeClickFix was founded and has been headquartered in the city since 2007. Peter Paul Candy Manufacturing Company (a candy-making division of the Hershey Company) was formerly located in the city. Achillion Pharmaceuticals and Alexion Pharmaceuticals were also formerly headquartered in New Haven.

== Law and government ==
=== Political structure ===
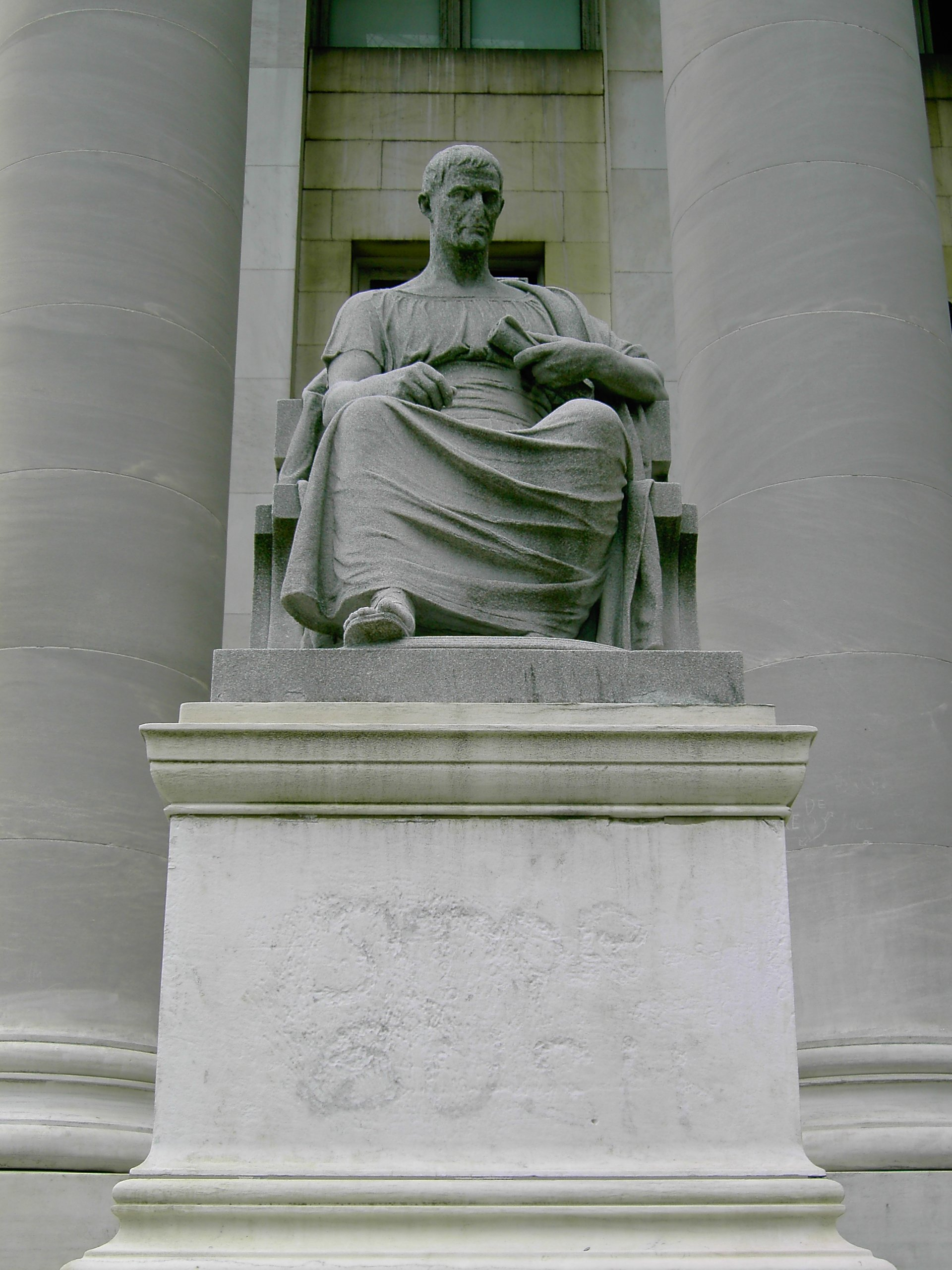
Statue of Roman orator Cicero at the New Haven County Courthouse

New Haven is governed via the mayor-council system. Connecticut municipalities (like those of neighboring states Massachusetts and Rhode Island) provide nearly all local services (such as fire and rescue, education, snow removal, etc.), as county government has been abolished since 1960.

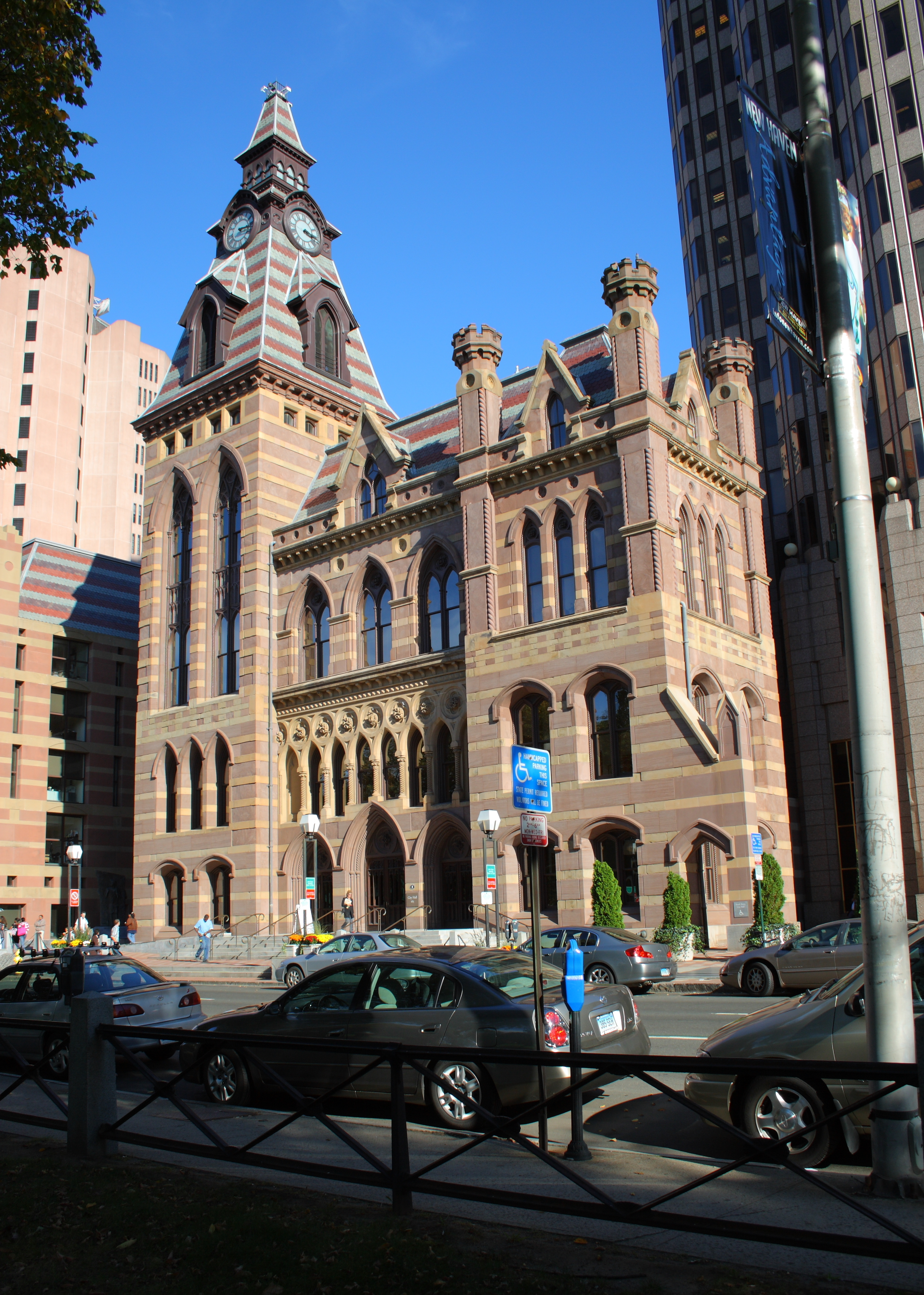
New Haven City Hall

New Haven County merely refers to a grouping of towns and a judicial district, not a governmental entity. New Haven is a member of the South Central Connecticut Regional Council of Governments (SCRCOG), a regional agency created to facilitate coordination between area municipal governments and state and federal agencies, in the absence of county government.

Justin Elicker is the mayor of New Haven. He was sworn in as the 51st mayor of New Haven on January 1, 2020.

The city council, called the Board of Alders, consists of thirty members, each elected from single-member wards. Each of the 30 wards consists of slightly over 4,300 residents; redistricting takes place every ten years. Beginning in 2027, all mayor and alder terms are four years.

As of 2026, the Board of Alders consists of thirty Democrats.

The city is overwhelmingly Democratic. In 2017, of the town's 83,694 voters, 66% were registered as Democrats (−4% since 2015), 4% were registered as Republicans (+1%), and 29% were unaffiliated (+3). The board of alders is dominated by Democrats; a Republican has not served as a New Haven alder since 2011.

New Haven is served by the New Haven Police Department, which had 443 sworn officers in 2011. The city is also served by the New Haven Fire Department.

=== State and federal representation ===
The Greater New Haven area is served by the New Haven Judicial District Court and the New Haven Superior Court, both headquartered at the New Haven County Courthouse. The federal District Court for the District of Connecticut has a New Haven facility, the Richard C. Lee United States Courthouse.

==== Connecticut General Assembly ====
New Haven is represented in the Connecticut General Assembly by two senators and six representatives, all Democrats.

Connecticut State Senate
District	Name	Assumed office	Party affiliation
10	Gary Winfield	2014	Democratic
11	Martin Looney	1993	Democratic

Connecticut House of Representatives
District	Name	Assumed office	Party affiliation
92	Patricia Dillon	1985	Democratic
93	Toni Walker	2001	Democratic
94	Steven Winter	2025	Democratic
95	Juan Candelaria	2003	Democratic
96	Roland Lemar	2011	Democratic
97	Alphonse Paolillo	2017	Democratic

==== United States Congress ====
New Haven lies within Connecticut's 3rd congressional district and has been represented by Democrat Rosa DeLauro in the United States House of Representatives since 1991. It is represented by Democrats Richard Blumenthal and Chris Murphy in the United States Senate.

=== Political history ===
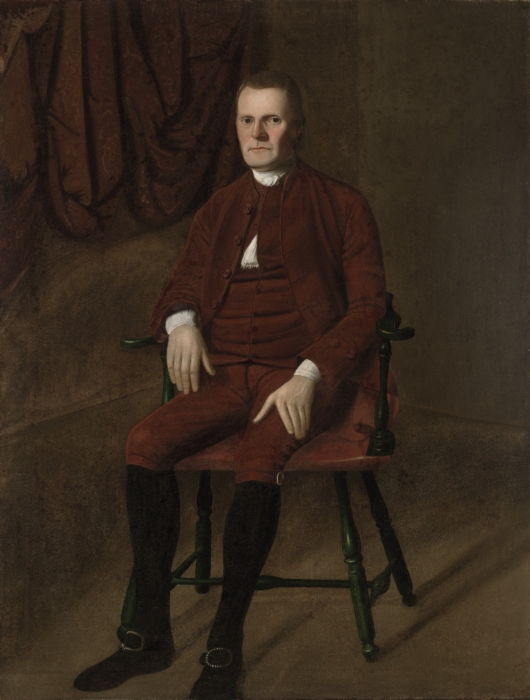
Roger Sherman, signer of Declaration of Independence and Constitution, author of Connecticut Compromise, and first mayor of New Haven. Portrait by Ralph Earl, c. 1775.

New Haven is the birthplace of former president George W. Bush, who was born when his father, former president George H. W. Bush, was living in New Haven while a student at Yale. In addition to being the site of the college educations of both Presidents Bush, as Yale students, New Haven was also the temporary home of former presidents William Howard Taft, Gerald Ford, and Bill Clinton, as well as Secretary of State John Kerry. President Clinton met his wife, former U.S. Secretary of State Hillary Clinton, while the two were students at Yale Law School. Former vice presidents John C. Calhoun and Dick Cheney also studied in New Haven (although the latter did not graduate from Yale). Before the 2008 election, the last time there was not a person with ties to New Haven and Yale on either major party's ticket was 1968. James Hillhouse, a New Haven native, served as President pro tempore of the United States Senate in 1801.

New Haven voters overwhelmingly supported Al Gore in the 2000 election, Yale graduate John Kerry in 2004, and Barack Obama in 2008 and 2012. In the 2008 election, New Haven County was third among all Connecticut counties in campaign contributions, after Fairfield and Hartford counties. (Connecticut, in turn, was ranked 14th among all states in total campaign contributions.)

New Haven was the subject of Who Governs? Democracy and Power in An American City, a very influential book in political science by preeminent Yale professor Robert A. Dahl, which includes an extensive history of the city and thorough description of its politics in the 1950s. New Haven's theocratic history is also mentioned several times by Alexis de Tocqueville in his classic volume on 19th-century American political life, Democracy in America. New Haven was the residence of conservative thinker William F. Buckley, Jr., in 1951, when he wrote his influential God and Man at Yale. William Lee Miller's The Fifteenth Ward and the Great Society (1966) similarly explores the relationship between local politics in New Haven and national political movements, focusing on Lyndon Johnson's Great Society and urban renewal.

George Williamson Crawford, a Yale Law School graduate, served as the city's first black corporation counsel from 1954 to 1962, under Mayor Richard C. Lee.

In 1970, the New Haven Black Panther trials took place, the largest and longest trials in Connecticut history. Black Panther Party co-founder Bobby Seale and ten other party members were tried for murdering an alleged informant. Beginning on May Day, the city became a center of protest for 12,000 Panther supporters, college students, and New Left activists (including Jean Genet, Benjamin Spock, Abbie Hoffman, Jerry Rubin, and John Froines), who amassed on the New Haven Green, across the street from where the trials were being held. Violent confrontations between the demonstrators and the New Haven Police occurred, and several bombs were set off in the area by radicals. The event became a rallying point for the New Left and critics of the Nixon Administration.

During the summer of 2007, New Haven was the center of protests by anti-immigration groups who opposed the city's program of offering municipal ID cards, known as the Elm City Resident Card, to illegal immigrants. In 2008, the country of Ecuador opened a consulate in New Haven to serve the large Ecuadorean immigrant population in the area. It is the first foreign mission to open in New Haven since Italy opened a consulate (now closed) in the city in 1910.

In April 2009, the United States Supreme Court agreed to hear a suit over reverse discrimination brought by 20 white and Hispanic firefighters against the city. The suit involved the 2003 promotion test for the New Haven Fire Department. After the tests were scored, no blacks scored high enough to qualify for consideration for promotion, so the city announced that no one would be promoted. On June 29, 2009, the United States Supreme Court ruled in favor of the firefighters, agreeing that they were improperly denied promotion because of their race. The case, Ricci v. DeStefano, became highly publicized and brought national attention to New Haven politics due to the involvement of then-Supreme Court nominee (and Yale Law School graduate) Sonia Sotomayor in a lower court decision.

Garry Trudeau, creator of the political Doonesbury comic strip, attended Yale University. There he met fellow student and later Green Party candidate for Congress Charles Pillsbury, a long-time New Haven resident for whom Trudeau's comic strip is named. During his college years, Pillsbury was known by the nickname "The Doones". A theory of international law, which argues for a sociological normative approach in regards to jurisprudence, is named the New Haven Approach, after the city. Connecticut US senator Richard Blumenthal is a Yale graduate, as was former Connecticut US Senator Joe Lieberman who also was a New Haven resident for many years, before moving back to his hometown of Stamford.

=== Crime ===
Crime increased in the 1990s, with New Haven having one of the ten highest violent crime rates per capita in the United States. In the late 1990s New Haven's crime began to stabilize. The city, adopting a policy of community policing, saw crime rates drop during the 2000s.

Violent crime levels vary dramatically among New Haven's neighborhoods, with some areas having crime rates in line with the state of Connecticut average, and others having extremely high rates of crime. A 2011 New Haven Health Department report identifies these issues in greater detail.

In 2010, New Haven ranked as the 18th most dangerous city in the United States (albeit below the safety benchmark of 200.00 for the second consecutive year). However, according to a completely different analysis conducted by the "24/7 Wall Street Blog", in 2011 New Haven had risen to become the fourth most dangerous city in the United States, and was widely cited in the press as such.

However, an analysis by the Regional Data Cooperative for Greater New Haven, Inc., has shown that due to issues of comparative denominators and other factors, such municipality-based rankings can be considered inaccurate. For example, two cities of identical population can cover widely differing land areas, making such analyses irrelevant. The research organization called for comparisons based on neighborhoods, blocks, or standard methodologies (similar to those used by Brookings, DiversityData, and other established institutions), not based on municipalities.

== Education ==
=== Colleges and universities ===
New Haven is a notable center for higher education. Yale University, at the heart of downtown, is one of the city's best known features and its largest employer. New Haven is also home to Southern Connecticut State University, part of the Connecticut State University System, and Albertus Magnus College, a private institution. Gateway Community College has a campus in downtown New Haven, formerly located in the Long Wharf district; Gateway consolidated into one campus downtown into a new state-of-the-art campus (on the site of the old Macy's building) and was open for the Fall 2012 semester.

There are several institutions immediately outside of New Haven, as well. Quinnipiac University and the Paier College of Art are located just to the north, in the town of Hamden. The University of New Haven is located not in New Haven but in neighboring West Haven.

The 1911 student body of the Hopkins School, the fifth-oldest educational institution in the United States

=== Primary and secondary schools ===
New Haven Public Schools is the school district serving the city. Wilbur Cross High School and Hillhouse High School are New Haven's two largest public secondary schools.

Hopkins School, a private school, was founded in 1660 and is the fifth-oldest educational institution in the United States. New Haven is home to a number of other private schools as well as public magnet schools, including Metropolitan Business Academy, High School in the Community, Hill Regional Career High School, Co-op High School, New Haven Academy, Edgewood Magnet School, ACES Educational Center for the Arts, the Foote School and the Sound School, all of which draw students from New Haven and suburban towns. New Haven is also home to two Achievement First charter schools, Amistad Academy and Elm City College Prep, and to Common Ground, an environmental charter school.

The city is renowned for its progressive school lunch programs, and participation in statewide bussing efforts toward increased diversity in schools.

== Culture ==
=== Cuisine ===
Livability.com named New Haven as the Best Foodie City in the country in 2014. There are dozens of Zagat-rated restaurants in New Haven, the most in Connecticut and the third most in New England (after Boston and Cambridge). More than 120 restaurants are located within two blocks of the New Haven Green. The city is home to an eclectic mix of ethnic restaurants and small markets specializing in various foreign foods. Represented cuisines include Malaysian, Ethiopian, Spanish, Belgian, French, Greek, Latin American, Mexican, Italian, Thai, Chinese, Japanese, Vietnamese, Korean, Indian, Jamaican, Cuban, Peruvian, Syrian/Lebanese, and Turkish.

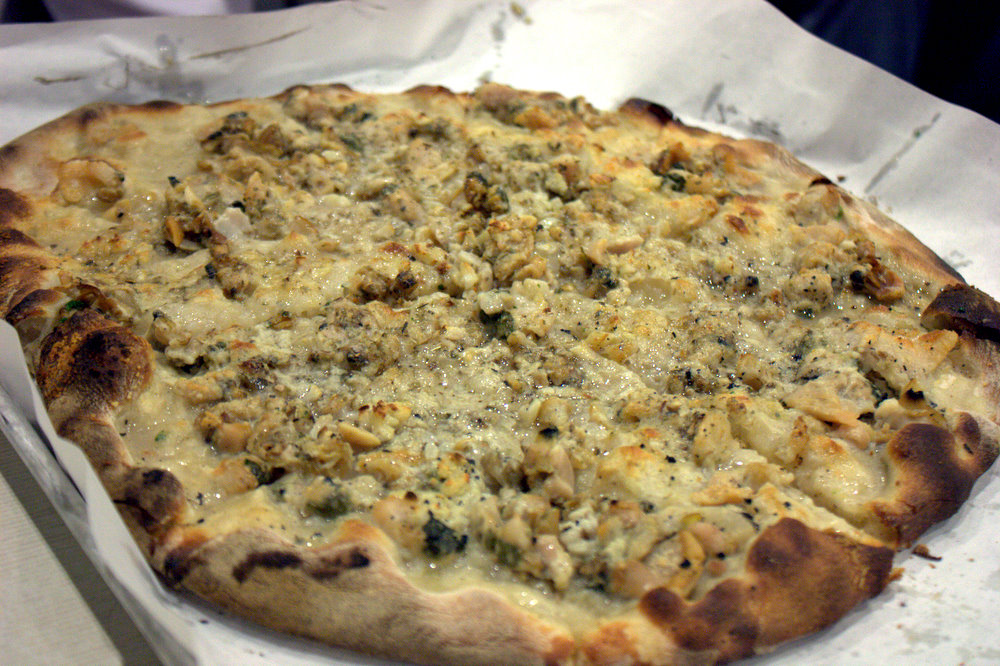
White clam pizza from Pepe's, in the classic New Haven-style

New Haven's greatest culinary claim to fame may be its pizza, which has been claimed to be among the best in the country, or even in the world. New Haven-style pizza, called "apizza", made its debut at the iconic Frank Pepe Pizzeria Napoletana (known as Pepe's) in 1925. Apizza is baked in coal- or wood-fired brick ovens, and is notable for its thin crust. Apizza may be red (with a tomato-based sauce) or white (with a sauce of garlic and olive oil), and pies ordered "plain" are made without the otherwise customary mozzarella (originally smoked mozzarella, known as "scamorza" in Italian). A white clam pie is a well-known specialty of the restaurants on Wooster Street in the Little Italy section of New Haven, including Pepe's and Sally's Apizza (which opened in 1938). Modern Apizza on State Street, which opened in 1934, is also well-known.

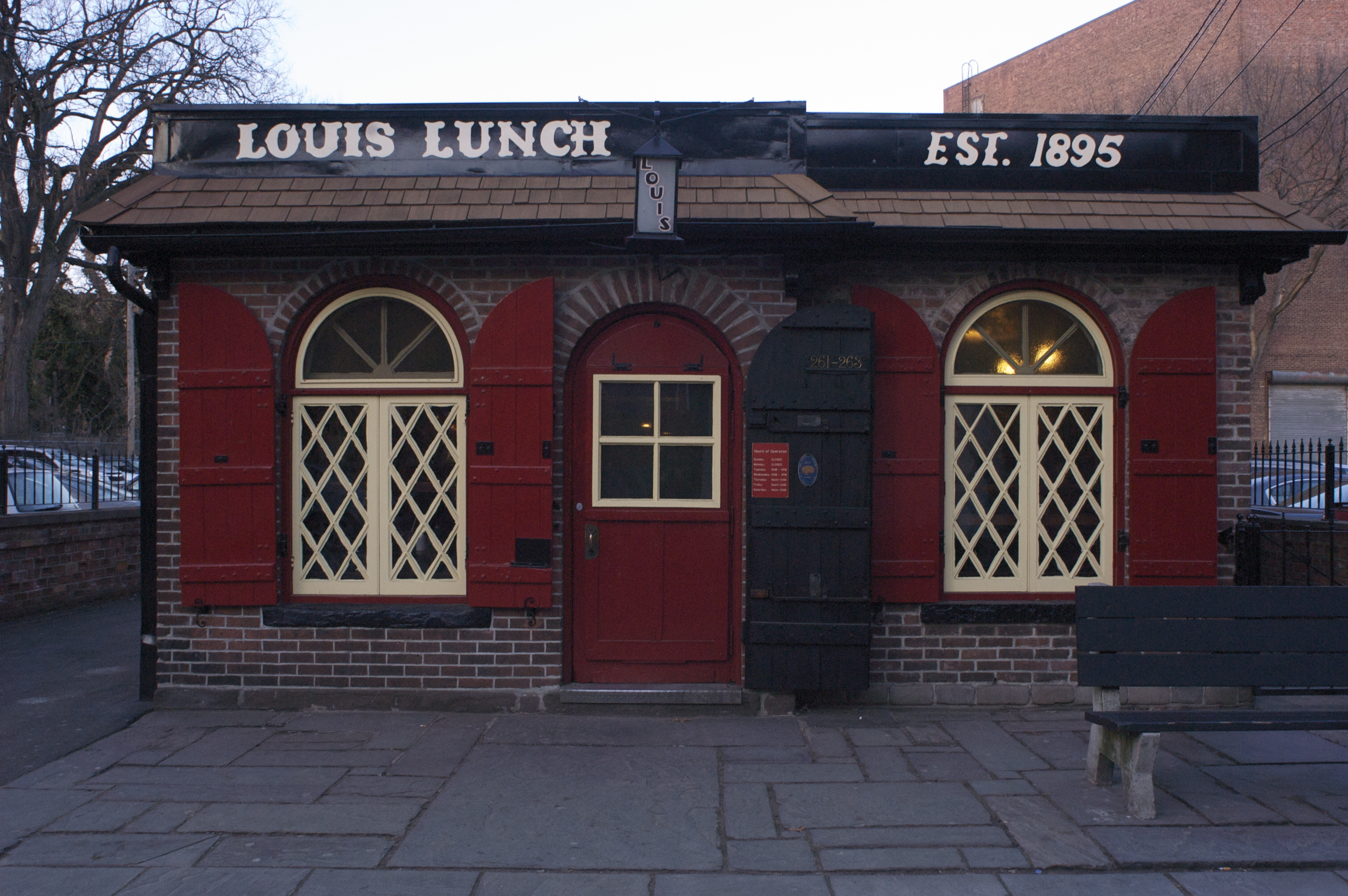
Louis' Lunch, where the hamburger was reputedly invented in 1900

A second New Haven gastronomical claim to fame is Louis' Lunch, which is located in a small brick building on Crown Street and has been serving fast food since 1895. Though fiercely debated, the restaurant's founder Louis Lassen is credited by the Library of Congress with inventing the hamburger and steak sandwich. Louis' Lunch broils hamburgers, steak sandwiches and hot dogs vertically in original antique 1898 cast iron stoves using gridirons, patented by local resident Luigi Pieragostini in 1939, that hold the meat in place while it cooks.

A third New Haven gastronomical claim to fame is Miya's, the first sustainable sushi restaurant in the world. Miya's, founded by Chef Yoshiko Lai in 1982, featured the first sustainable seafood-based sushi menu, the first plant-based sushi menu, and the first invasive species menu in the world. Second generation Miya's chef, Bun Lai, is the 2016 White House Champions of Change for Sustainable Seafood and a James Beard Foundation Award nominee. Chef Bun Lai is credited as the first chef in the world for implementing a sustainability paradigm to the cuisine of sushi.

During weekday lunchtime, over 150 lunch carts and food trucks cater to diners around the city. The carts and food trucks cluster at four main points: on Long Wharf Drive, along the city's shoreline with quick access off Interstate 95, by Yale – New Haven Hospital in the center of the Hospital Green (Cedar and York streets), by Yale's Trumbull College (Elm and York streets), and on the intersection of Prospect and Sachem streets by the Yale School of Management.

Popular farmers' markets, managed by the local non-profit CitySeed, set up shop weekly in several neighborhoods, including Westville/Edgewood Park, Fair Haven, Upper State Street, Wooster Square, and Downtown/New Haven Green.

=== Theatre and film ===
The city hosts numerous theatres and production houses, including the Yale Repertory Theatre, the Long Wharf Theatre, and the Shubert Theatre. There is also theatre activity from the Yale School of Drama, which works through the Yale University Theatre and the student-run Yale Cabaret. Southern Connecticut State University hosts the Lyman Center for the Performing Arts. The shuttered Palace Theatre (opposite the Shubert Theatre) was renovated and reopened as the College Street Music Hall in May 2015. Smaller theatres include the Little Theater on Lincoln Street. Cooperative Arts and Humanities High School also has a theatre on College Street. The theatre is used for student productions, and is the home to weekly services to a local non-denominational church, the City Church New Haven.

The Shubert Theatre once premiered many major theatrical productions before their Broadway debuts. Productions that premiered at the Shubert include Oklahoma! (which was also written in New Haven), Carousel, South Pacific, My Fair Lady, The King and I, and The Sound of Music, and the Tennessee Williams play A Streetcar Named Desire.

Bow Tie Cinemas owns and operates the Criterion Cinemas, the first new movie theater to open in New Haven in over 30 years and the first luxury movie complex in the city's history. The Criterion has seven screens and opened in November 2004, showing a mix of upscale first run commercial and independent film.

=== Museums ===
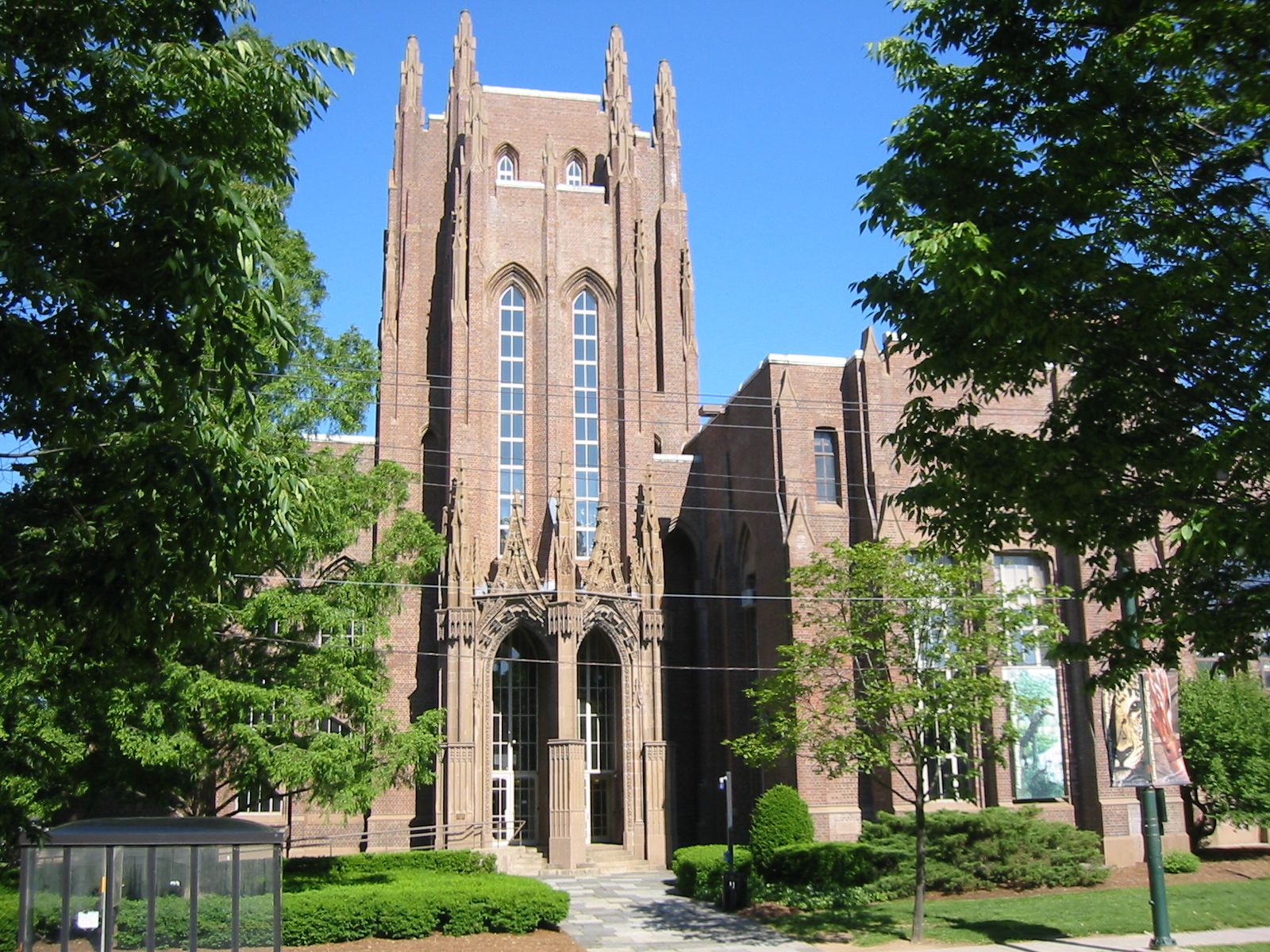
The historic Peabody Museum of Natural History at Yale

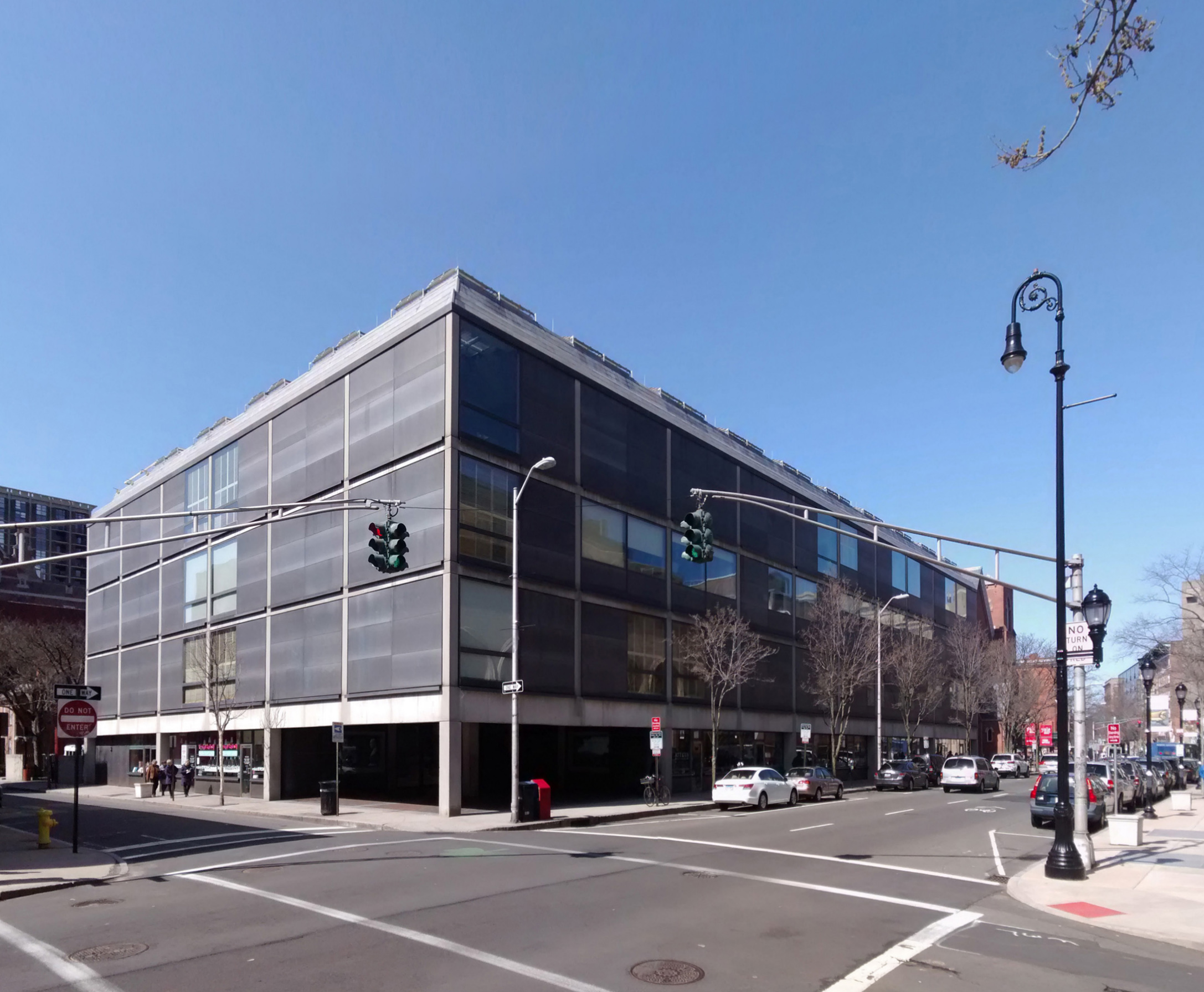
The Yale Center for British Art, designed by Louis Kahn

New Haven has a variety of museums, many of them associated with Yale. The Beinecke Rare Book and Manuscript Library features an original copy of the Gutenberg Bible. There is also the Connecticut Children's Museum; the Blessed Michael McGivney Pilgrimage Center (the Knights of Columbus museum) near that organization's world headquarters; the Peabody Museum of Natural History; the Yale University Collection of Musical Instruments; the Eli Whitney Museum (across the town line in Hamden, Connecticut, on Whitney Avenue); the Yale Center for British Art, which houses the largest collection of British art outside the U.K.; Lost in New Haven, and the Yale University Art Gallery, the western hemisphere's oldest college art museum. New Haven is also home to the New Haven Museum and Historical Society on Whitney Avenue, which has a library of many primary source treasures dating from Colonial times to the present.

New Haven has several contemporary art galleries showcasing the work of local, national, and international artists. These include City Gallery and A. Leaf Gallery in the downtown area. Westville galleries include Kehler Liddell, Jennifer Jane Gallery, and The Hungry Eye. Other arts venues in the city include the Creative Arts Workshop, the Ely Center of Contemporary Art, and NXTHVN, an arts incubator in the Dixwell neighborhood.

The Erector Square complex in the Fair Haven neighborhood, a former A.C. Gilbert toy factory established in 1923, houses more than 175 studios used by artists, designers, and other creative professionals. The complex is a principal venue of New Haven's annual Open Studios event each October, during which artists open their studios to the public. The event, formerly known as City-Wide Open Studios and organized by the Artspace gallery, has continued as an artist-led effort since Artspace closed its Orange Street space in 2023.

New Haven is the home port of a life-size replica of the historical Freedom Schooner Amistad, which is open for tours at Long Wharf pier at certain times during the summer. Also at Long Wharf pier is the Quinnipiack schooner, offering sailing cruises of the harbor area throughout the summer. The Quinnipiack also functions as a floating classroom for hundreds of local students.

=== Music ===
The New Haven Green is the site of many free music concerts, especially during the summer months. These have included the New Haven Symphony Orchestra, the July Free Concerts on the Green, and the New Haven Jazz Festival in August. The Jazz Festival, which began in 1982, is one of the longest-running free outdoor festivals in the U.S., until it was canceled for 2007. Headliners such as Dave Brubeck, Ray Charles and Celia Cruz have historically drawn 30,000 to 50,000 fans, filling up the New Haven Green to capacity. The New Haven Jazz Festival was revived in 2008 and has been sponsored since by Jazz Haven.

New Haven is home to the concert venue Toad's Place, and a new venue, College Street Music Hall. The city has retained an alternative art and music underground that has helped to influence post-punk era music movements such as indie, college rock and underground hip-hop.

The Yale School of Music contributes to the city's music scene by offering hundreds of free concerts throughout the year at venues in and around the Yale campus. Large performances are held in the 2,700-seat Woolsey Hall auditorium, which contains the world's largest symphonic organs, while chamber music and recitals are performed in Sprague Hall.

Hardcore band Hatebreed are from Wallingford, but got their start in New Haven under the name Jasta 14. The band Miracle Legion formed in New Haven in 1983. Folk musicians from New Haven include Loren Mazzacane Connors and Kath Bloom.

The Hillhouse Opera Company is a U.S. non-profit opera company based in New Haven that performs in the New Haven area. Founded in 2008 by Victoria Leigh Gardner, Nicole Rodriguez and Jim Coatsworth Hillhouse Opera Company has performed operas as well as opera scenes programs, master classes and concert series. In 2011, the Company professionally staged the works created through the Riverview Opera Project. The Riverview Opera Project created workshops for children and adolescents at Riverview Hospital, Connecticut's only state-funded psychiatric hospital for youth, and helped them to successfully create, produce, and perform four original operas.

=== Festivals ===
In addition to the Jazz Festival (described above), New Haven serves as the home city of the annual International Festival of Arts and Ideas. New Haven's Saint Patrick's Day parade, which began in 1842, is New England's oldest and draws the largest crowds of any one-day spectator event in Connecticut. The St. Andrew the Apostle Italian Festival has taken place in the historic Wooster Square neighborhood every year since 1900. Other parishes in the city celebrate the Feast of Saint Anthony of Padua and a carnival in honor of St. Bernadette Soubirous. New Haven celebrates Powder House Day every April on the New Haven Green to commemorate the city's entrance into the Revolutionary War. The annual Wooster Square Cherry Blossom Festival commemorates the 1973 planting of 72 Yoshino Japanese cherry blossom trees by the New Haven Historic Commission in collaboration with the New Haven Parks Department and residents of the neighborhood. The Festival now draws well over 5,000 visitors. The Film Fest New Haven has been held annually since 1995.

=== Newspapers and media ===
New Haven is served by the daily New Haven Register, the weekly "alternative" New Haven Advocate (which is run by Tribune, the corporation owning the Hartford Courant), the online daily New Haven Independent, and the monthly Grand News Community Newspaper. Downtown New Haven is covered by an in-depth civic news forum, Design New Haven. The Register also backs PLAY magazine, a weekly entertainment publication. The city is also served by several student-run papers, including the Yale Daily News, the weekly Yale Herald and a humor tabloid, Rumpus Magazine.

WTNH Channel 8, the ABC affiliate for Connecticut, WCTX Channel 59, the MyNetworkTV affiliate for the state, Connecticut Public Television station WEDY channel 65, a PBS affiliate, and WTXX Channel 34, the IntrigueTV affiliate, broadcast from New Haven. All New York City news and sports team stations broadcast to New Haven County.

=== Sports and athletics ===
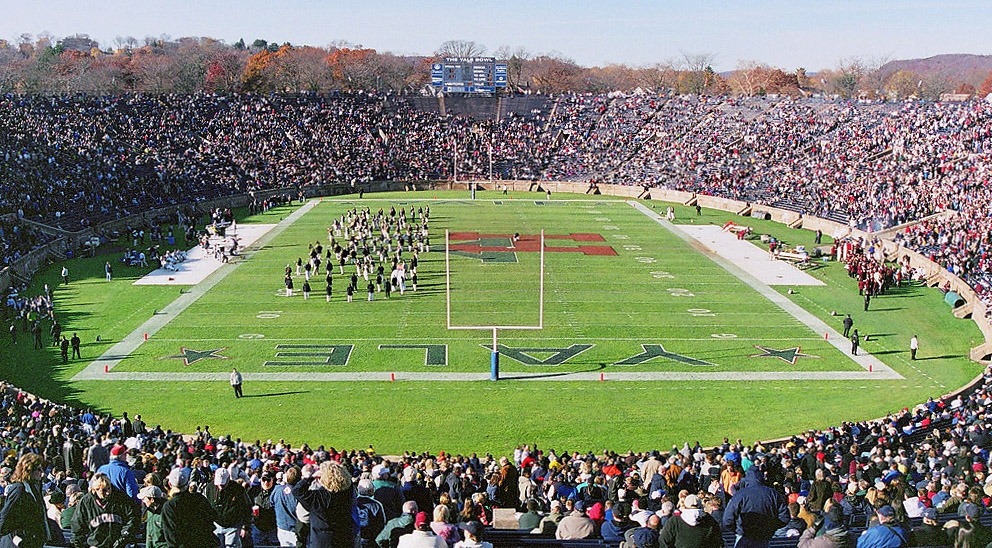
Yale Bowl during "The Game" in 2001

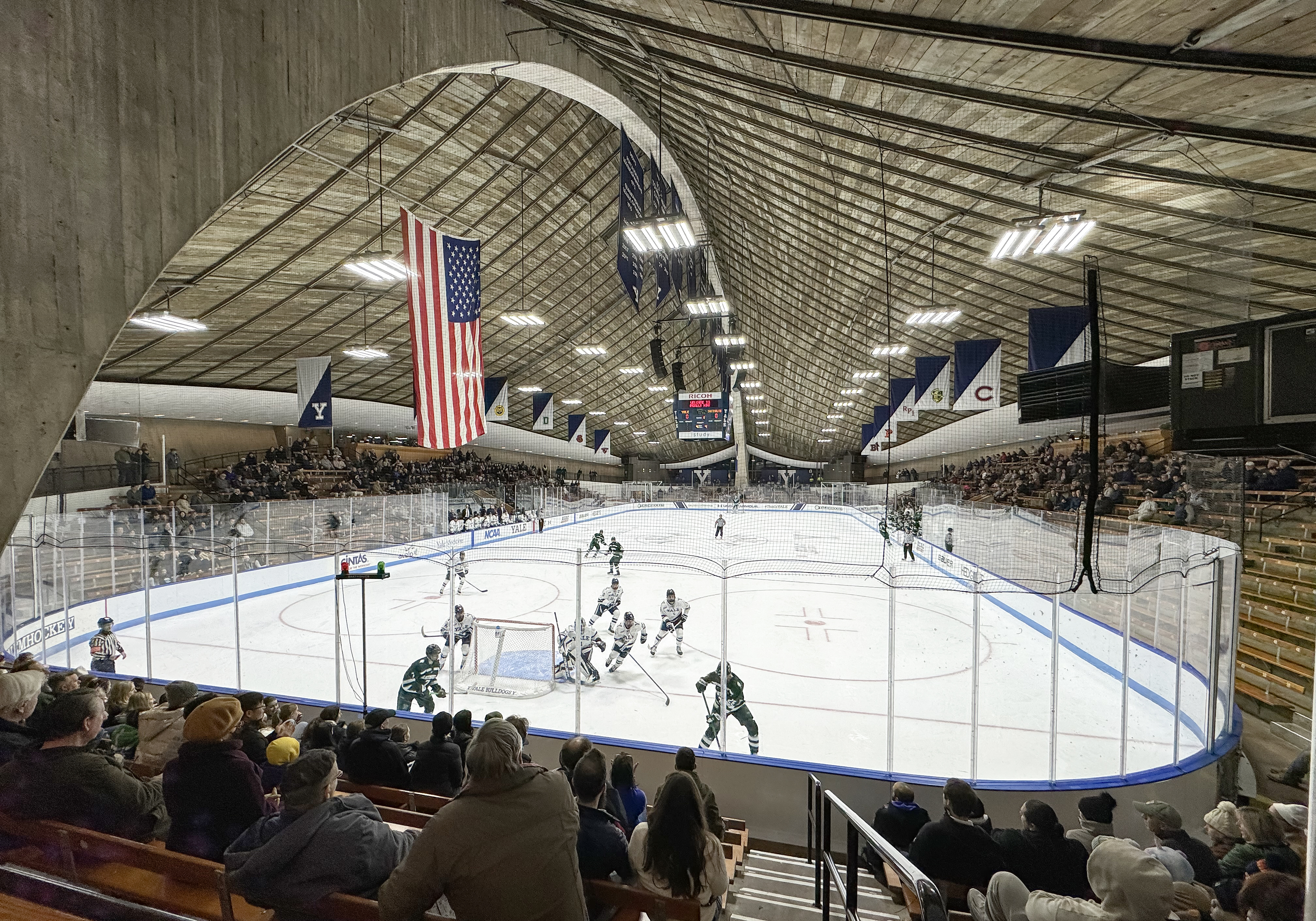
Ingalls Rink

New Haven has a history of professional sports franchises dating back to the 19th century and has been the home to professional baseball, basketball, football, hockey, and soccer teams—including the New York Giants of the National Football League from 1973 to 1974, who played at the Yale Bowl. Throughout the second half of the 20th century, New Haven consistently had minor league hockey and baseball teams, which played at the New Haven Arena (built in 1926, demolished in 1972), New Haven Coliseum (1972–2002), and Yale Field (1928–present).

When John DeStefano, Jr., became mayor of New Haven in 1995, he outlined a plan to transform the city into a major cultural and arts center in the Northeast, which involved investments in programs and projects other than sports franchises. As nearby Bridgeport built new sports facilities, the brutalist New Haven Coliseum rapidly deteriorated. Believing the upkeep on the venue to be a drain of tax dollars, the DeStefano administration closed the Coliseum in 2002; it was demolished in 2007. New Haven's last professional sports team, the New Haven County Cutters, left in 2009. The DeStefano administration did, however, see the construction of the New Haven Athletic Center in 1998, a 94,000-square-foot (8,700 m^{2}) indoor athletic facility with a seating capacity of over 3,000. The NHAC, built adjacent to Hillhouse High School, is used for New Haven public schools athletics, as well as large-scale area and state sporting events; it is the largest high school indoor sports complex in the state.

New Haven was the host of the 1995 Special Olympics World Summer Games; then-President Bill Clinton spoke at the opening ceremonies. The city is home to the Pilot Pen International tennis event, which takes place every August at the Connecticut Tennis Center, one of the largest tennis venues in the world. New Haven biannually hosts "The Game" between Yale and Harvard, the country's second-oldest college football rivalry. Numerous road races take place in New Haven, including the USATF 20K Championship during the New Haven Road Race.

Greater New Haven is home to a number of college sports teams. The Yale Bulldogs play Division I college sports, as do the Quinnipiac Bobcats in neighboring Hamden. Division II athletics are played by Southern Connecticut State University and the University of New Haven (actually located in neighboring West Haven), while Albertus Magnus College athletes perform at the Division III level.

New Haven is home to many New York Yankees, New York Mets, and Boston Red Sox fans due to the proximity of New York City and Boston.

Walter Camp, deemed the "father of American football", was a New Havener.

The New Haven Warriors rugby league team play in the AMNRL. They have a large number of Pacific Islanders playing for them. Their field is located at the West Haven High School's Ken Strong Stadium. They won the 2008 AMNRL Grand Final.

== Structures ==
=== Architecture ===
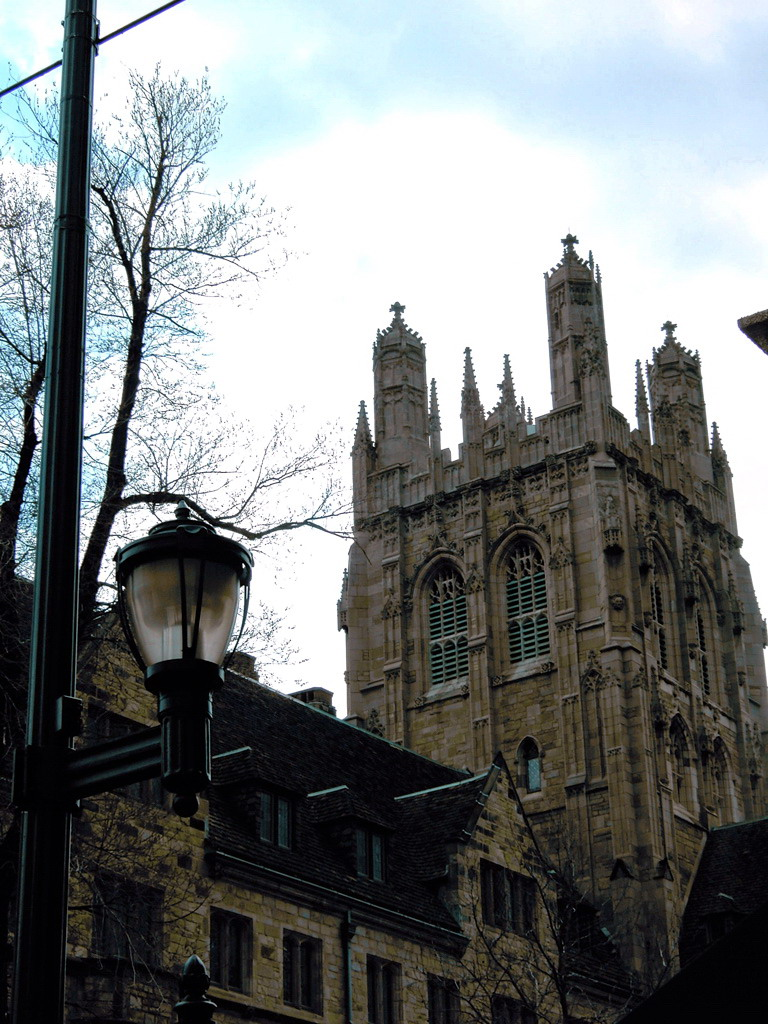
Collegiate Gothic architecture is popular in New Haven.

New Haven has many architectural landmarks dating from every important time period and architectural style in American history. The city has been home to a number of architects and architectural firms that have left their mark on the city including Ithiel Town and Henry Austin in the 19th century and Cesar Pelli, Warren Platner, Kevin Roche, Herbert Newman and Barry Svigals in the 20th. The Yale School of Architecture has fostered this important component of the city's economy. Cass Gilbert, of the Beaux-Arts school, designed New Haven's Union Station and the New Haven Free Public Library and was also commissioned for a City Beautiful plan in 1919. Frank Lloyd Wright, Marcel Breuer, Alexander Jackson Davis, Philip C. Johnson, Gordon Bunshaft, Louis Kahn, James Gamble Rogers, Frank Gehry, Charles Willard Moore, Stefan Behnisch, James Polshek, Paul Rudolph, Eero Saarinen and Robert Venturi all have designed buildings in New Haven. Yale's 1950s-era Ingalls Rink, designed by Eero Saarinen, was included on the America's Favorite Architecture list created in 2007.

Several residential homes in New Haven were designed by Alice Washburn, a noted female architect whose Colonial Revival style set a standard for homes in the region.

Many of the city's neighborhoods are well-preserved as walkable "museums" of 19th- and 20th-century American architecture, particularly by the New Haven Green, Hillhouse Avenue and other residential sections close to Downtown New Haven. Overall, a large proportion of the city's land area is National (NRHP) historic districts. One of the best sources on local architecture is New Haven: Architecture and Urban Design, by Elizabeth Mills Brown.

The five tallest buildings in New Haven are:

1. Connecticut Financial Center 383 ft (117m) 26 floors
2. 360 State Street 338 ft (103m) 32 floors
3. Knights of Columbus Building 321 ft (98m) 23 floors
4. Kline Biology Tower 250 ft (76m) 16 floors
5. Crown Towers 233 ft (71m) 22 floors

=== Historic points of interest ===
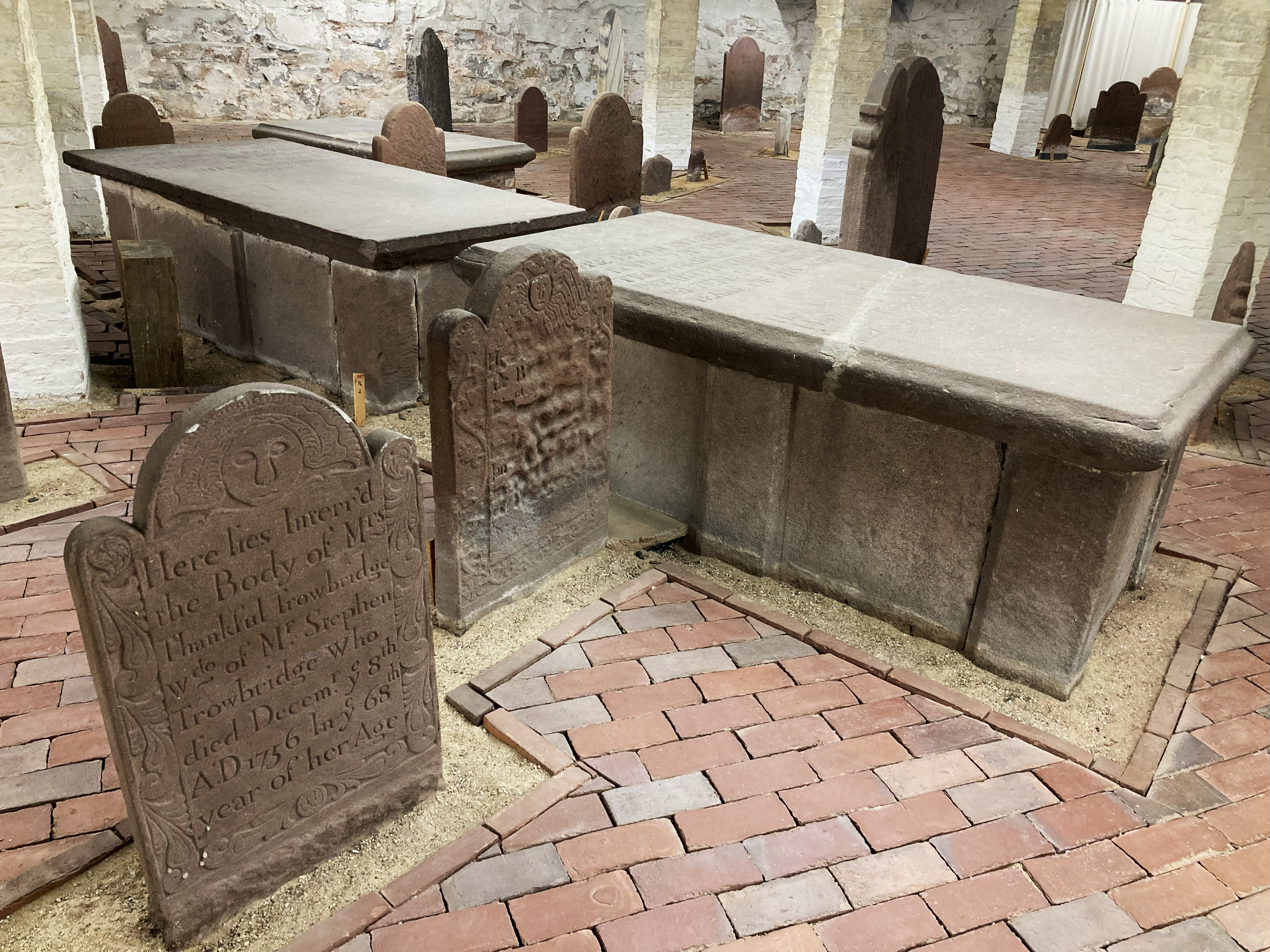
The Crypt - Center Church on the Green

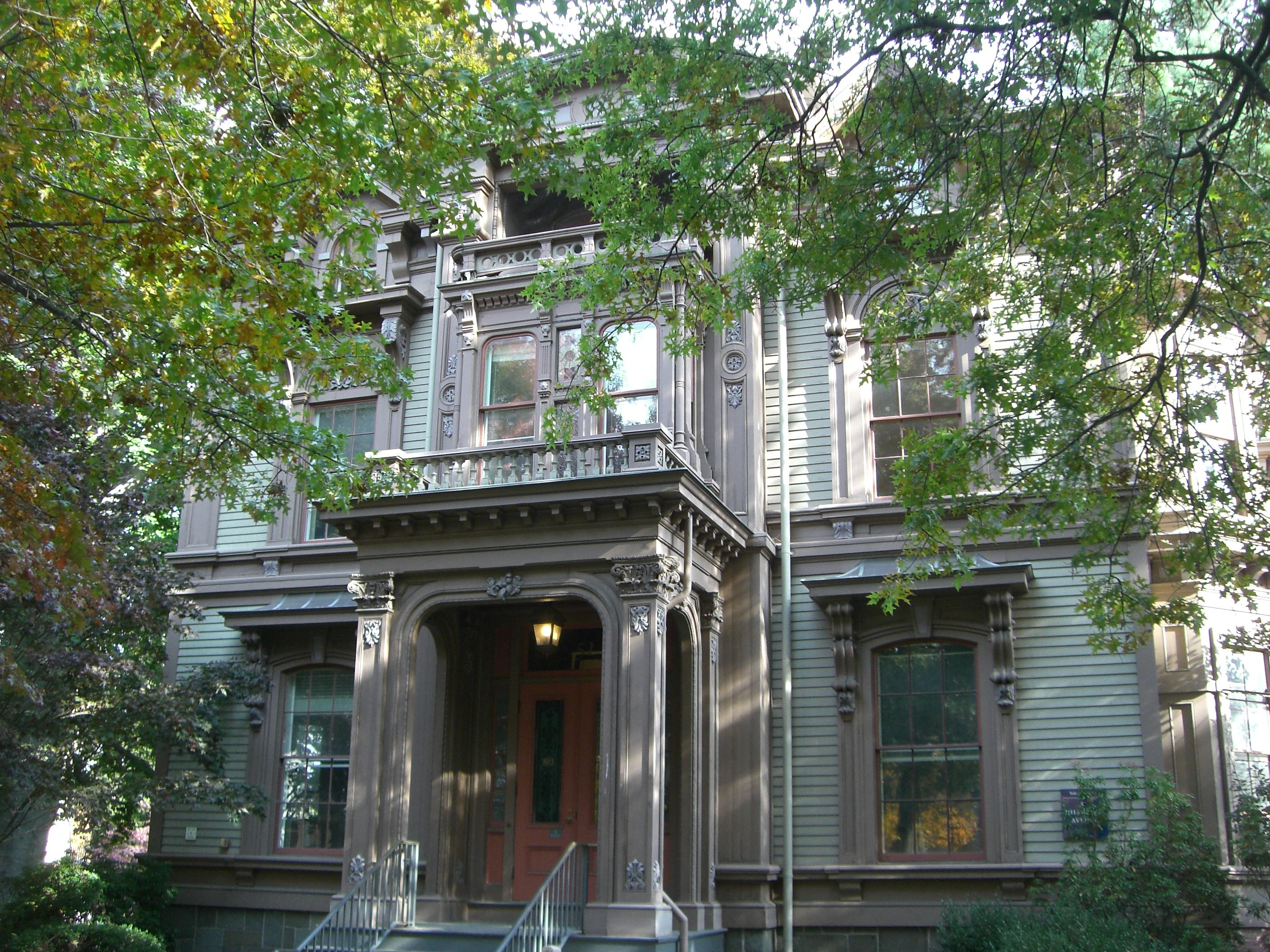
The Graves-Dwight on Hillhouse Avenue

Many historical sites exist throughout the city, including 59 properties listed on the National Register of Historic Places. Of these, nine are among the 60 U.S. National Historic Landmarks in Connecticut. The New Haven Green, one of the National Historic Landmarks, was formed in 1638, and is home to three 19th-century churches. Below the First Church of Christ in New Haven (referred to as the Center Church on the Green) lies a 17th-century crypt, which is open to visitors. Some of the more famous burials include the first wife of Benedict Arnold and the aunt and grandmother of President Rutherford B. Hayes; Hayes visited the crypt while President in 1880. The Old Campus of Yale University is located next to the Green, and includes Connecticut Hall, Yale's oldest building and a National Historic Landmark. The Hillhouse Avenue area, which is listed on the National Register of Historic Places and is also a part of Yale's campus, has been called a walkable museum, due to its 19th-century mansions and street scape; Charles Dickens is said to have called Hillhouse Avenue "the most beautiful street in America" when visiting the city in 1868.

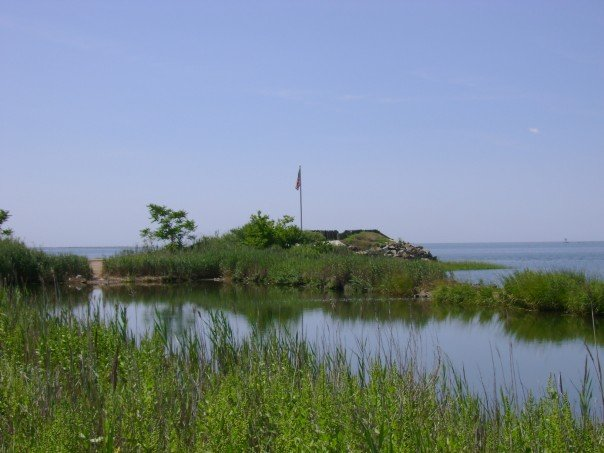
The restored Black Rock Fort

In 1660, Edward Whalley (a cousin and friend of Oliver Cromwell) and William Goffe, two English Civil War generals who signed the death warrant of King Charles I, hid in a rock formation in New Haven after having fled England upon the restoration of Charles II to the English throne. They were later joined by a third regicide, John Dixwell. The rock formation, which is now a part of West Rock Park, is known as Judges' Cave, and the path leading to the cave is called the Regicides Trail.

After the American Revolutionary War broke out in 1776, the Connecticut colonial government ordered the construction of Black Rock Fort (to be built on top of an older 17th-century fort) to protect the port of New Haven. In 1779, during the Battle of New Haven, British soldiers captured Black Rock Fort and burned the barracks to the ground. The fort was reconstructed in 1807 by the federal government (on orders from the Thomas Jefferson administration), and rechristened Fort Nathan Hale, after the Revolutionary War hero who had lived in New Haven. The cannons of Fort Nathan Hale were successful in defying British war ships during the War of 1812. In 1863, during the Civil War, a second Fort Hale was built next to the original, complete with bomb-resistant bunkers and a moat, to defend the city should a Southern raid against New Haven be launched. The United States Congress deeded the site to the state in 1921, and all three versions of the fort have been restored. The site is now listed on the National Register of Historic Places and receives thousands of visitors each year.

Grove Street Cemetery, a National Historic Landmark which lies adjacent to Yale's campus, contains the graves of Roger Sherman, Eli Whitney, Noah Webster, Josiah Willard Gibbs, Charles Goodyear and Walter Camp, among other notable burials. The cemetery is noted for its Egyptian Revival gateway, and is the oldest planned burial ground in the United States. The Union League Club of New Haven building, located on Chapel Street, is notable for not only being a historic Beaux-Arts building, but also is built on the site where Roger Sherman's home once stood; George Washington is known to have stayed at the Sherman residence while President in 1789 (one of three times Washington visited New Haven throughout his lifetime).

Two sites pay homage to the time President and Chief Justice William Howard Taft lived in the city, as both a student and later Professor at Yale: a plaque on Prospect Street marks the site where Taft's home formerly stood, and downtown's Taft Apartment Building (formerly the Taft Hotel) bears the name of the former president who resided in the building for eight years before becoming Chief Justice of the United States.

Lighthouse Point Park, a public beach run by the city, was a popular tourist destination during the Roaring Twenties, attracting luminaries of the period such as Babe Ruth and Ty Cobb. The park remains popular among New Haveners, and is home to the Five Mile Point Lighthouse, constructed in 1847, and the Lighthouse Point Carousel, constructed in 1916. Five Mile Point Light was decommissioned in 1877 following the construction of Southwest Ledge Light at the entrance of the harbor, which remains in service to this day. Both of the lighthouses and the carousel are listed on the National Register of Historic Places.

Other historic sites in the city include the Soldiers and Sailors Monument, which stands at the summit of East Rock, the Marsh Botanical Garden, Wooster Square, Dwight Street, Louis' Lunch, and the Farmington Canal, all of which date back to the 19th century. Other historic parks besides the Green include Edgerton Park, Edgewood Park, and East Rock Park, each of which is included on the National Register of Historic Places.

== Transportation ==
=== Rail ===
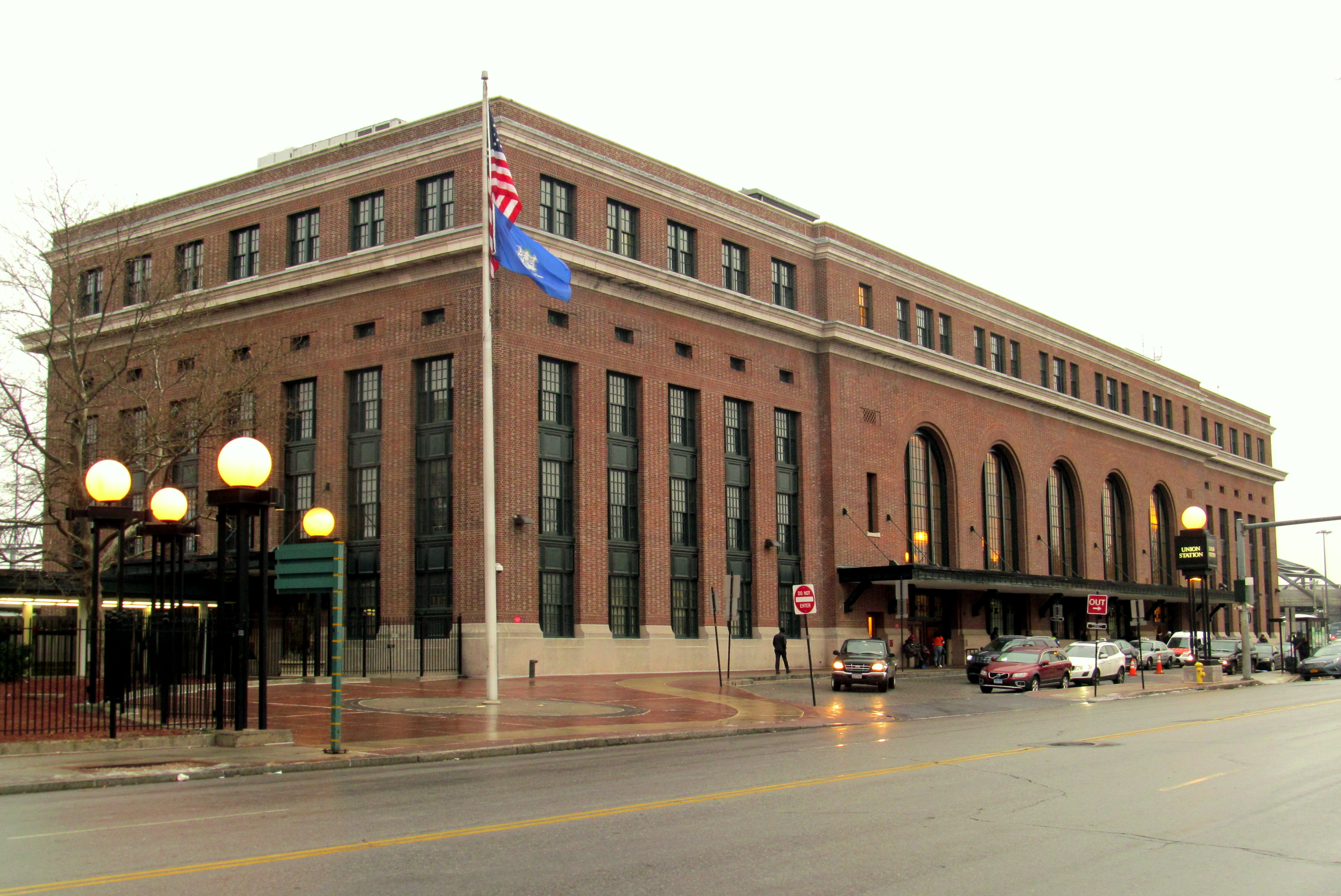
Union Station in 2016

New Haven has two railroad stations, connected to New York City and points along the Northeast Corridor by commuter rail, regional rail and inter-city rail. Service is provided by:

- Metro-North Railroad's New Haven Line (commuter rail) to points west, such as Bridgeport, Stamford, Greenwich, and New York City
- Shore Line East (commuter rail) to points east, such as Old Saybrook and New London, with limited rush-hour service west to Stamford
- Hartford Line (commuter rail) to points north, such as Meriden, Hartford, Windsor, and Springfield, Massachusetts
- Amtrak (regional and intercity rail) to Northeast Corridor hubs, such as New York, Philadelphia, Washington D.C., and Boston

The city's main railroad station is the historic Beaux-Arts Union Station, which serves Metro-North, Hartford Line, and Shore Line East commuter trains. Approximately 175 trains serve Union Station on weekdays. Union Station is also served by four Amtrak lines: the Northeast Regional and the high-speed Acela Express provide service to New York, Washington, D.C., and Boston, and rank as the first and second busiest routes in the country; the New Haven–Springfield Line provides service to Hartford and Springfield, Massachusetts; and the Vermonter provides service to both Washington, D.C., and Vermont, 15 miles (24 km) from the Canada–US border.

An additional station, State Street Station, was opened in 2002, providing passengers easier access to downtown New Haven. State Street Station is currently serviced by Shore Line East and Hartford Line trains, plus some peak-hour Metro-North trips.

=== Bus ===
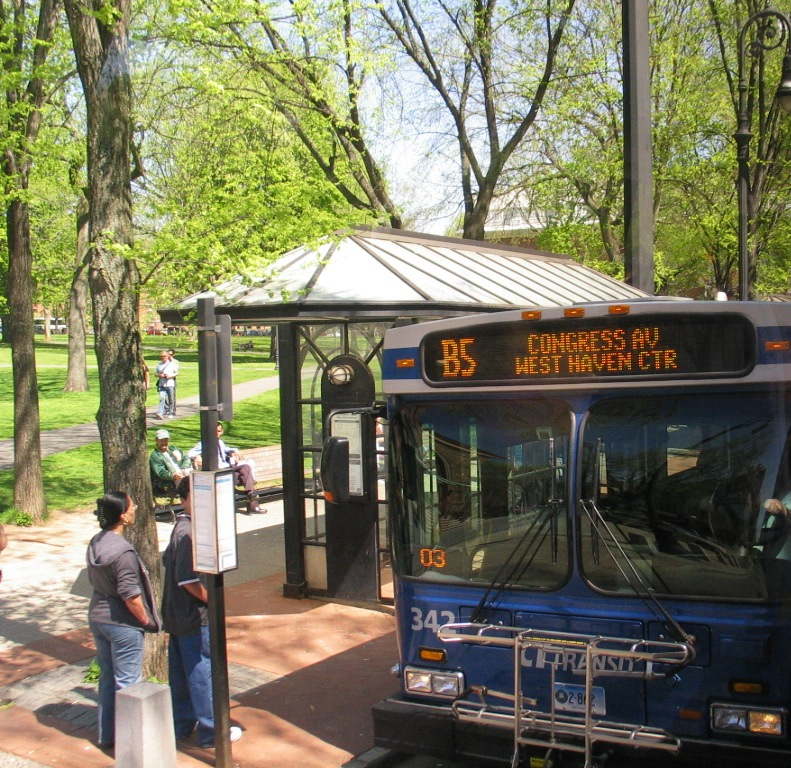
A New Haven Division bus in Downtown New Haven, near the Green

The New Haven Division of Connecticut Transit (CT Transit), the state's bus system, is the second largest division in the state with 24 routes. All routes originate from the New Haven Green, making it the central transfer hub of the city. Service is provided to 19 different municipalities throughout Greater New Haven. Bus routes were formerly identified by letters, but as of October 8, 2017, all service was renamed using 200-series numbers, in accordance with a renumbering of CTtransit's statewide services.

CT Transit's Union Station Shuttle provides free service from Union Station to the New Haven Green and several New Haven parking garages. Peter Pan and Greyhound bus lines have scheduled stops at Union Station, and connections downtown can be made via the Union Station Shuttle. A private company operates the New Haven/Hartford Express which provides commuter bus service to Hartford. The Yale University Shuttle provides free transportation around New Haven for Yale students, faculty, and staff.

The New Haven Division buses follow routes that had originally been covered by trolley service. Horse-drawn streetcars began operating in New Haven in the 1860s, and by the mid-1890s all the lines had become electric. In the 1920s and 1930s, some of the trolley lines began to be replaced by bus lines, with the last trolley route converted to bus in 1948. The City of New Haven is in the very early stages of considering the restoration of streetcar (light-rail) service, which has been absent since the postwar period.

=== Bicycle ===
==== Bikeshare ====
On February 21, 2018, New Haven officially launched its Bike New Haven bikeshare program. based on dockless technology powered by Noa Technologies At time of launch, the program features 10 docking stations and 100 bikes, spread throughout the urban core; there are plans to reach 30 bike stations and 300 bikes by the end of April 2018. The launch of the New Haven bikeshare program coincided with the launch of Yale University's own bikeshare program, which uses the same technology powered by Noa.

==== Bike lanes ====
In 2004, the first bike lane in the city was added. The city has added covered bike parking spots at Union Station, in order to facilitate bike commuting to the station.

==== Farmington Canal Greenway ====
The Farmington Canal Trail is a rail trail that will eventually run continuously from downtown New Haven to Northampton, Massachusetts. The scenic trail follows the path of the historic New Haven and Northampton Company and the Farmington Canal. Currently, there is a continuous 14-mile (23 km) stretch of the trail from downtown, through Hamden and into Cheshire, making bicycle commuting between New Haven and those suburbs possible. The trail is part of the East Coast Greenway, a proposed 3,000-mile (4,800 km) bike path that would link every major city on the East Coast from Florida to Maine.

=== Roads ===
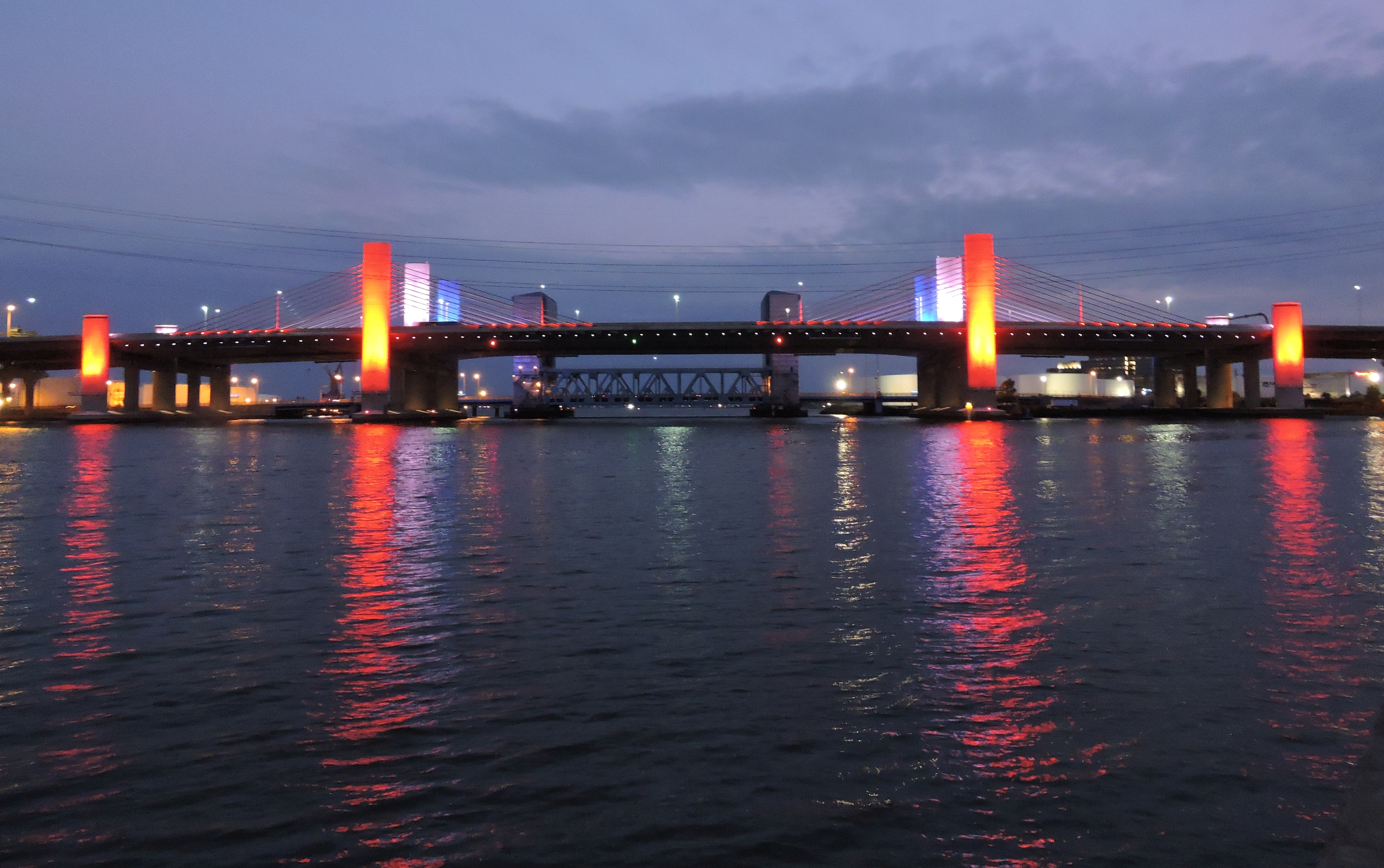
The Pearl Harbor Memorial Bridge, locally known as the Q Bridge, carries ten lanes over the Quinnipiac River along the Connecticut Turnpike.

New Haven lies at the intersection of Interstate 95 on the coast—which provides access southwards and/or westwards to the western coast of Connecticut and to New York City, and eastwards to the eastern Connecticut shoreline, Rhode Island, and eastern Massachusetts—and Interstate 91, which leads northward to the interior of Connecticut, Massachusetts and Vermont and the Canada–US border. I-95 is notorious for traffic jams increasing with proximity to New York City; on the east side of New Haven it passes over the Quinnipiac River via the Pearl Harbor Memorial, or "Q Bridge", which often presents a major bottleneck to traffic. I-91, however, is relatively less congested, except at the intersection with I-95 during peak travel times.

The Oak Street Connector (Connecticut Route 34) intersects I-91 at exit 1, just south of the I-95/I-91 interchange, and runs northwest for a few blocks as an expressway spur into downtown before emptying onto surface roads. The Wilbur Cross Parkway (Connecticut Route 15) runs parallel to I-95 west of New Haven, turning northwards as it nears the city and then running northwards parallel to I-91 through the outer rim of New Haven and Hamden, offering an alternative to the I-95/I-91 journey (restricted to non-commercial vehicles). Route 15 in New Haven is the site of the only highway tunnel in the state (officially designated as Heroes Tunnel), running through West Rock, home to West Rock Park and the Three Judges Cave.

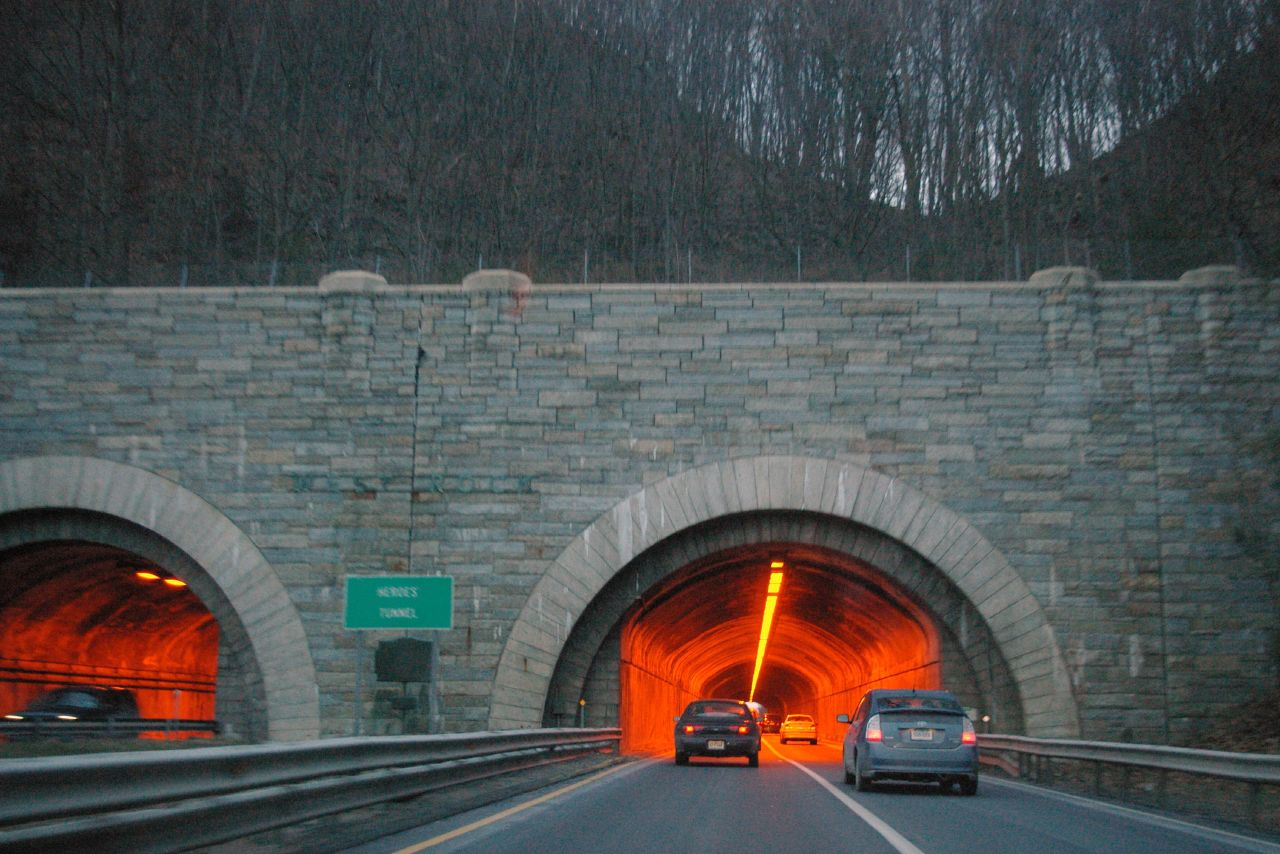
The Wilbur Cross Parkway passes through West Rock via Heroes Tunnel, the only highway tunnel in Connecticut.

The city also has several major surface arteries. U.S. Route 1 (Columbus Avenue, Union Avenue, Water Street, Forbes Avenue) runs in an east–west direction south of downtown serving Union Station and leading out of the city to Milford, West Haven, East Haven and Branford. The main road from downtown heading northwest is Whalley Avenue (partly signed as Route 10 and Route 63) leading to Westville and Woodbridge. Heading north towards Hamden, there are two major thoroughfares, Dixwell Avenue and Whitney Avenue. To the northeast are Middletown Avenue (Route 17), which leads to the Montowese section of North Haven, and Foxon Boulevard (Route 80), which leads to the Foxon section of East Haven and to the town of North Branford. To the west is Route 34, which leads to the city of Derby. Other major intracity arteries are Ella Grasso Boulevard (Route 10) west of downtown, and College Street, Temple Street, Church Street, Elm Street, and Grove Street in the downtown area.

Traffic safety is a major concern for drivers, pedestrians and cyclists in New Haven. In addition to many traffic-related fatalities in the city each year, since 2005, over a dozen Yale students, staff and faculty have been killed or injured in traffic collisions on or near the campus.

=== Airport ===
Tweed New Haven Airport is located within the city limits 3 miles (5 km) east of the business district, straddling the border with neighboring East Haven. Service to approximately 25 cities is provided by Avelo Airlines, which established its first East Coast base at the airport in 2021. Breeze Airways plans to begin operations at Tweed in December 2024, and will provide service to 10 destinations. The airport is currently planning a runway lengthening and new terminal on the East Haven side of the airport.

Bus service between Downtown New Haven and Tweed is available via the CT Transit New Haven Division.

=== Seaport ===
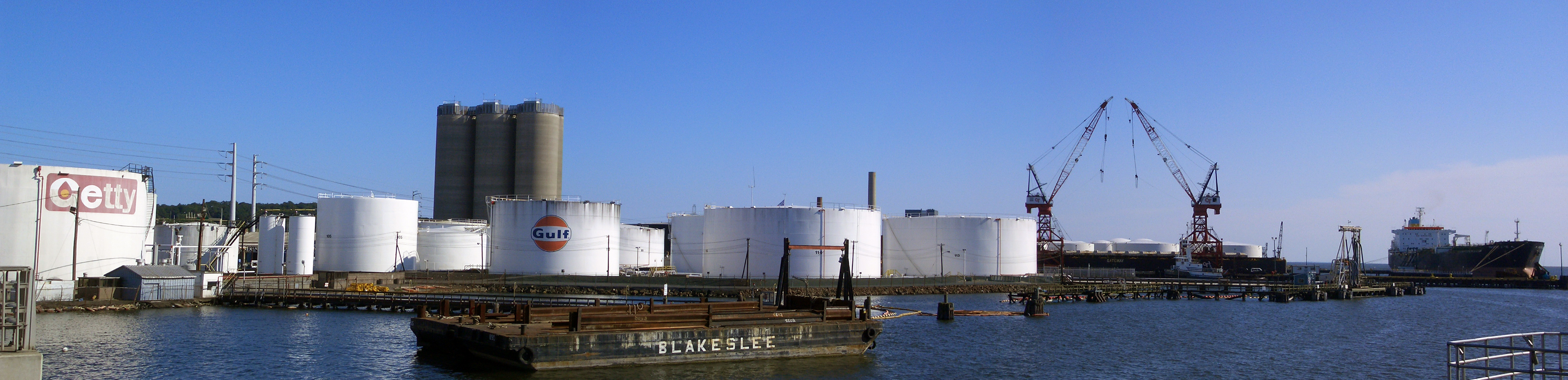
Port of New Haven

New Haven Harbor is home to the Port of New Haven, a deep-water seaport with three berths capable of hosting vessels and barges as well as the facilities required to handle break bulk cargo. The port has the capacity to load 200 trucks a day from the ground or via loading docks. Providence and Worcester Railroad provides freight rail transportation to the port, with the railroad operating a switch engine for yard movements, a private siding for loading and unloading, and trackage over the Tomlinson Lift Bridge toward the Northeast Corridor. Approximately 400,000 square feet (40,000 m^{2}) of inside storage and 50 acres (200,000 m^{2}) of outside storage are available at the site. Five shore cranes with a 250-ton capacity and 26 forklifts, each with a 26-ton capacity, are also available.

On June 17, 2013, the city commissioned the Nathan Hale, a 36 foot (11 m) port security vessel capable of serving search and rescue, firefighting, and constabulary roles.

== Infrastructure ==
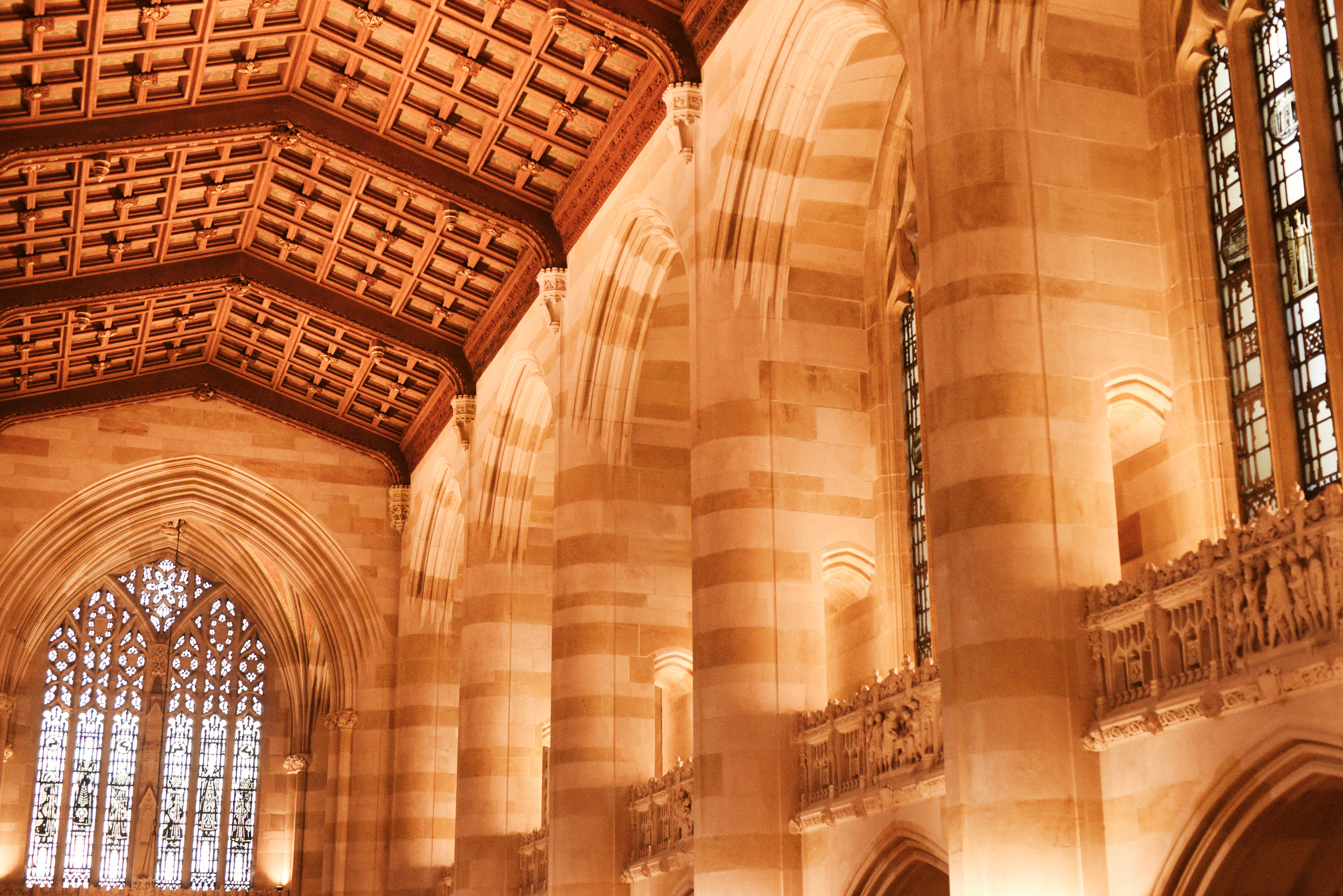
Yale's Sterling Memorial Library

=== Hospitals and medicine ===
The New Haven area supports several medical facilities that are considered some of the best hospitals in the country. There are two major medical centers downtown: Yale – New Haven Hospital has four pavilions, including the Yale – New Haven Children's Hospital and the Smilow Cancer Hospital; the Hospital of Saint Raphael is several blocks north, and touts its excellent cardiac emergency care program. Smaller downtown health facilities are the Temple Medical Center located downtown on Temple Street, Connecticut Mental Health Center/ across Park Street from Y-NHH, and the Hill Health Center, which serves the working-class Hill neighborhood. A large Veterans Affairs hospital is located in neighboring West Haven. To the west in Milford is Milford Hospital, and to the north in Meriden is the MidState Medical Center.

In recent years, Yale and the City of New Haven have been working to build a medical and biotechnology research hub in the city and Greater New Haven region. The city, state and Yale together run Science Park, a large site three blocks northwest of Yale's Science Hill campus. This multi-block site, approximately bordered by Mansfield Street, Division Street, and Shelton Avenue, is the former home of Winchester's and Olin Corporation's 45 large-scale factory buildings. Currently, sections of the site are large-scale parking lots or abandoned structures, but there is also a large remodeled and functioning area of buildings (leased primarily by a private developer) with numerous Yale employees, financial service and biotech companies.

A second biotechnology district is being planned for the median strip on Frontage Road, on land cleared for the never-built Route 34 extension. As of late 2009, a Pfizer drug-testing clinic, a medical laboratory building serving Yale – New Haven Hospital, and a mixed-use structure containing parking, housing and office space, have been constructed on this corridor. A former SNET telephone building at 300 George Street is being converted into lab space, and has been quite successful so far in attracting biotechnology and medical firms.

=== Power supply facilities ===
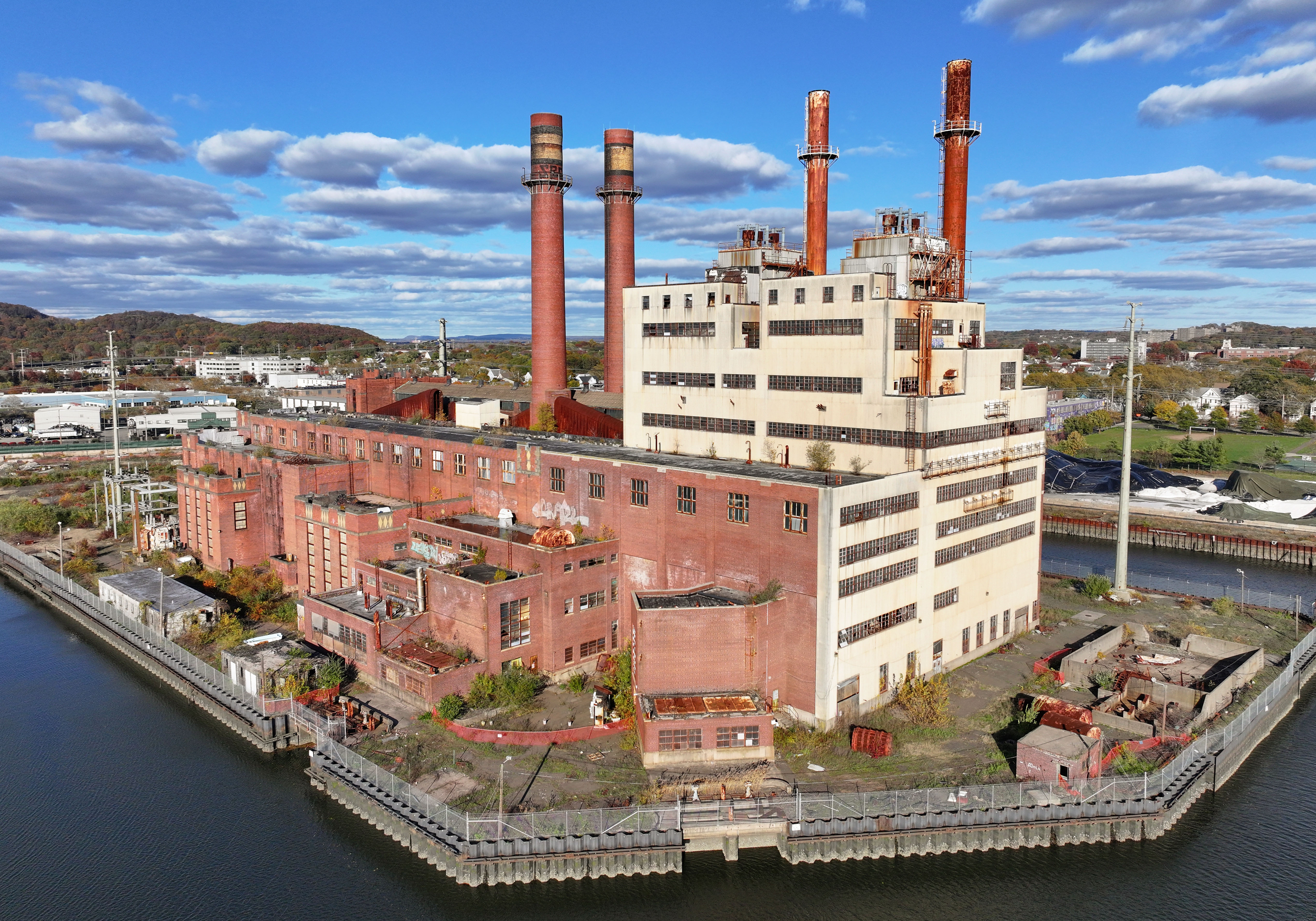
English Station, an abandoned thermal power plant in downtown

Electricity for New Haven is generated by a 448 MW oil and gas-fired generating station located on the shore at New Haven Harbor. PPL Corporation operates a 220 MW peaking natural gas turbine plant in nearby Wallingford.

Near New Haven there is the static inverter plant of the HVDC Cross Sound Cable.

There are three PureCell Model 400 fuel cells placed in the city of New Haven—one at the New Haven Public Schools and newly constructed Roberto Clemente School, one at the mixed-use 360 State Street building, and one at City Hall. According to Giovanni Zinn of the city's Office of Sustainability, each fuel cell may save the city up to $1 million in energy costs over a decade. The fuel cells were provided by ClearEdge Power, formerly UTC Power. Additional fuel cells are located at the Yale Peabody Museum of Natural History and at the Greater New Haven Water Pollution Control Authority (GNHWPCA). Ikea's New Haven facility also utilizes a 250 kW fuel cell and 940.8 kW solar array.

New Haven recently installed solar panels at 11 city schools with a combined power generation capacity of 1.8 MW. Owned and maintained by Greenskies, the panels allow New Haven to purchase electricity at a discounted rate through a power-purchasing agreement. The panels bring New Haven's solar capacity to 2.8 MW and will help New Haven meet its commitment to powering 100% of its municipal operations through clean energy, which it made in Summer 2017 and reaffirmed in the 2018 New Haven Climate and Sustainability Framework.

== In popular culture ==
Several movies have been filmed in New Haven since 2000, including Mona Lisa Smile (2003), with Julia Roberts, The Life Before Her Eyes (2007), with Uma Thurman, and Indiana Jones and the Kingdom of the Crystal Skull (2008) directed by Steven Spielberg and starring Harrison Ford, Cate Blanchett and Shia LaBeouf. The filming of Crystal Skull involved an extensive chase sequence through the streets of New Haven. Several downtown streets were closed to traffic and received a "makeover" to look like streets of 1957, when the film is set. 500 locals were cast as extras for the film. In Everybody's Fine (2009), Robert De Niro has a close encounter in what is supposed to be the Denver train station; the scene was filmed in New Haven's Union Station.

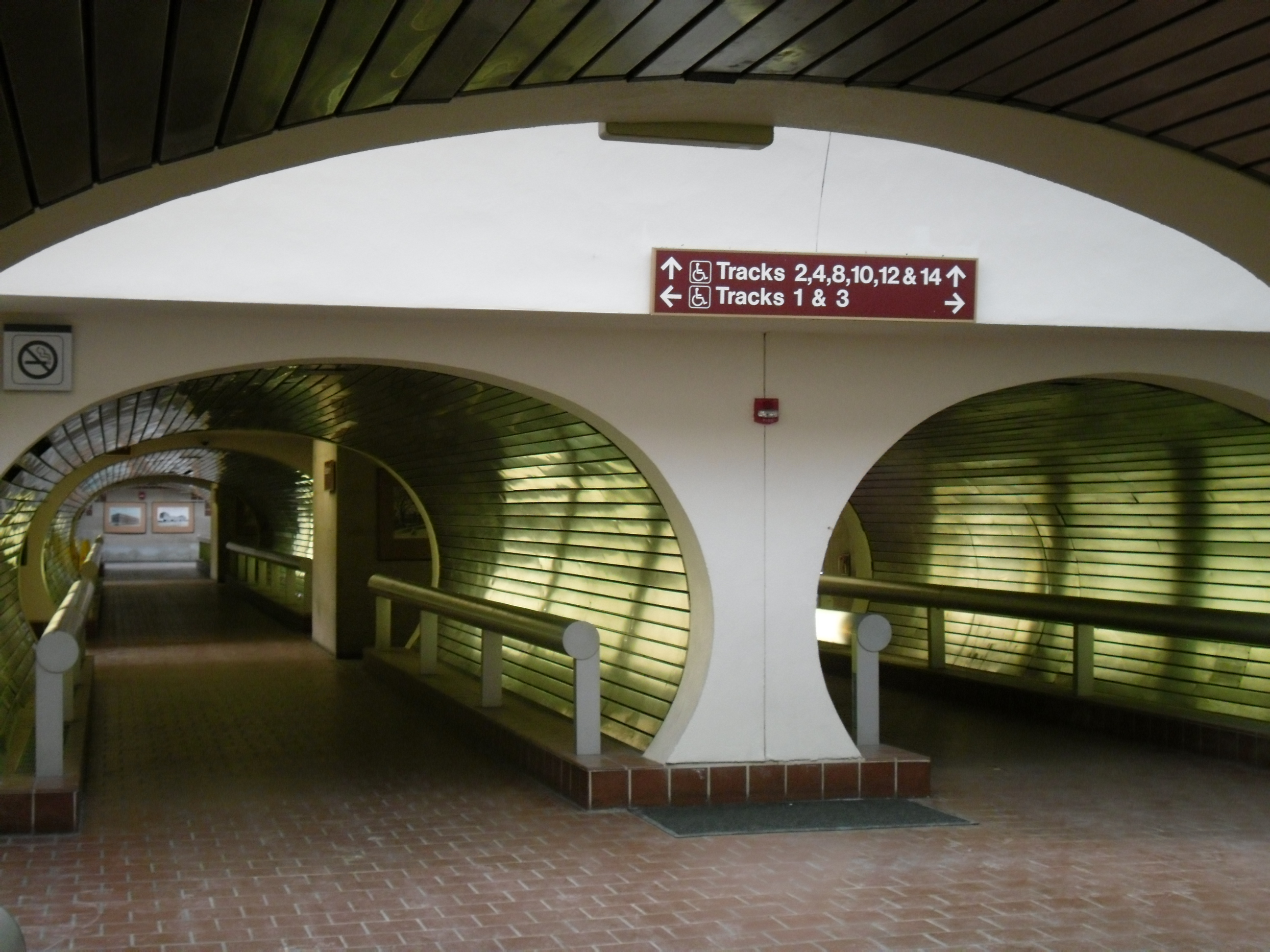
Union Station tunnel as seen in Everybody's Fine (2009)

New Haven is mentioned in the song Peace Frog by the Doors, referencing a 1967 incident where vocalist Jim Morrison was arrested for "attempting to incite a riot" in the middle of a concert at the New Haven Arena.

== Sister cities ==
New Haven's sister cities are:

- Afula, Israel
- Amalfi, Italy
- Avignon, France
- Changsha, China
- Freetown, Sierra Leone
- Huế, Vietnam
- León, Nicaragua, Nicaragua
- Taichung, Taiwan
- San Francisco Tetlanohcan, Mexico

Some of these were selected because of historical connection—Freetown because of the Amistad trial. Others, such as Amalfi and Afula, reflect ethnic groups in New Haven.

In 1990, the United Nations named New Haven a "Peace Messenger City".

== See also ==
- List of people from New Haven, Connecticut
- National Register of Historic Places listings in New Haven, Connecticut
- New Haven Fire Department
- New Haven Police Department
- Coast Guard Station New Haven
- USS New Haven, 4 ships
- Education in Connecticut
- History of Connecticut
