= Hartford Plaza =

Office building in Hartford

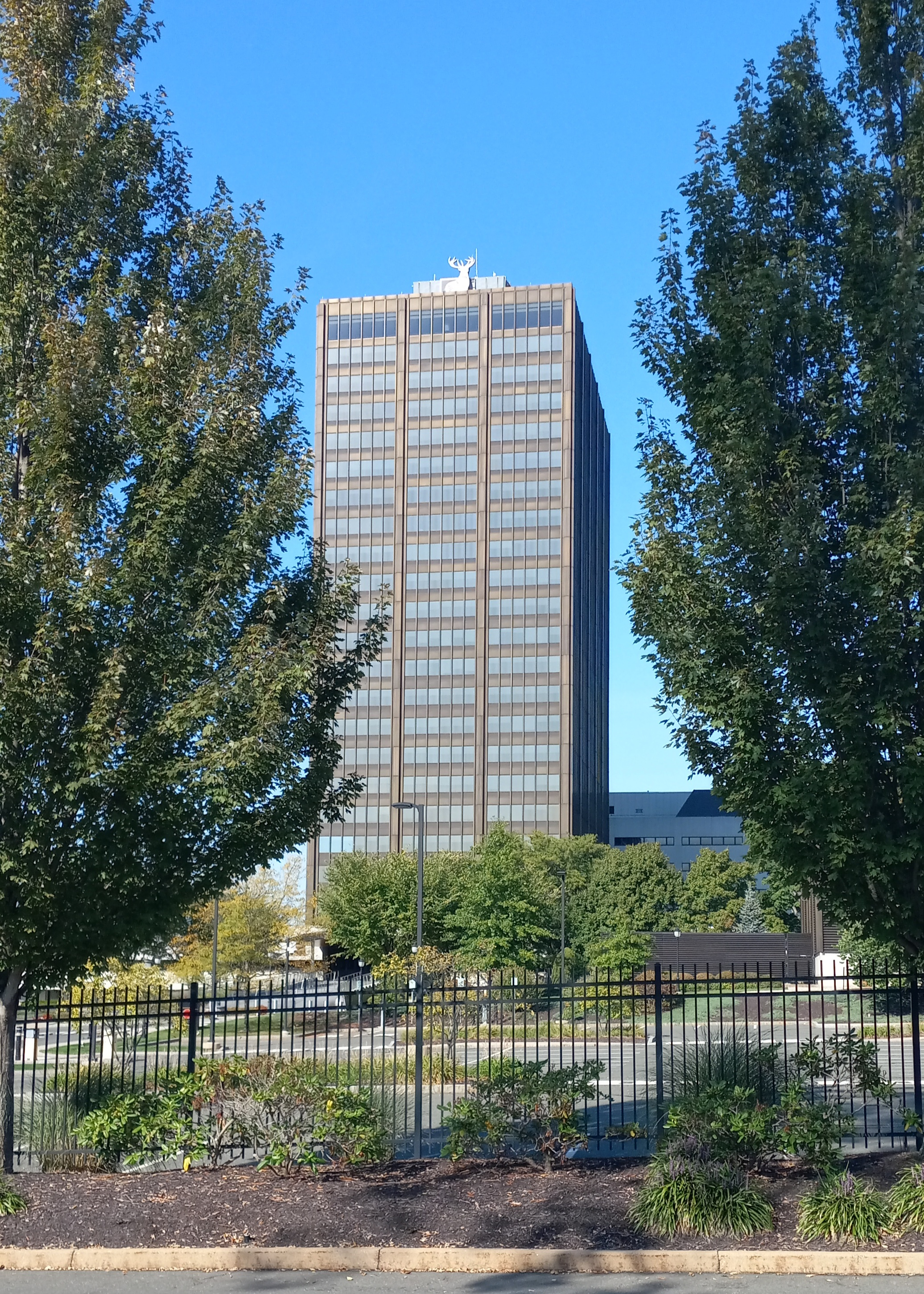
- Hartford Plaza in October 2025

- Location within Connecticut Hartford Plaza (the United States)

General information
- Status: Completed
- Type: Office
- Architectural style: International
- Location: 690 Asylum Avenue, Hartford, Connecticut, United States
- Coordinates: 41°46′16″N 72°41′18″W
- Completed: 1967

Height
- Roof: 334 ft (102 m)

Technical details
- Floor count: 22

Design and construction
- Architect: Skidmore, Owings & Merrill

Hartford Plaza is a 334 ft (102 m) tall international style office building located on 690 Asylum Avenue in the Asylum Hill neighborhood in Hartford. It was built in 1967 and has 22 floors. When it was completed it was the 3rd-tallest building in Hartford, as of January 2026 it is the 8th-tallest building in Hartford. The building is the current corporate headquarters for The Hartford, which has signage on the top of the building.

The building was designed by Skidmore, Owings & Merrill, which designed other notable skyscrapers in Hartford such as City Place I, Goodwin Square, and One State Street.

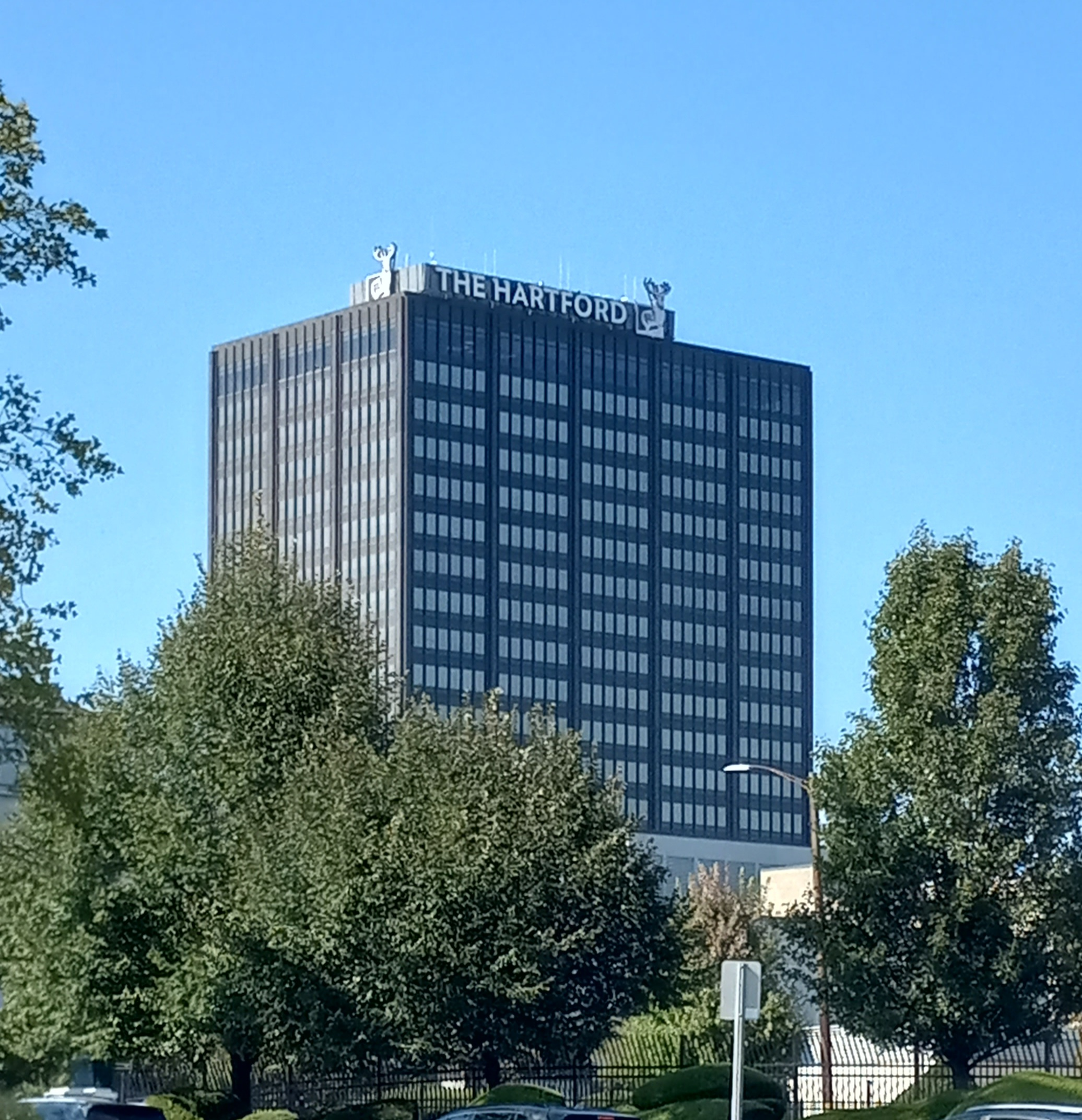
Hartford Plaza with the signage visible.

== See also ==
- List of tallest buildings in Hartford
- List of tallest buildings in Connecticut
- The Hartford
- 777 Main Street
- One Financial Plaza
- Constitution Plaza
