= Downtown Hartford =

- City
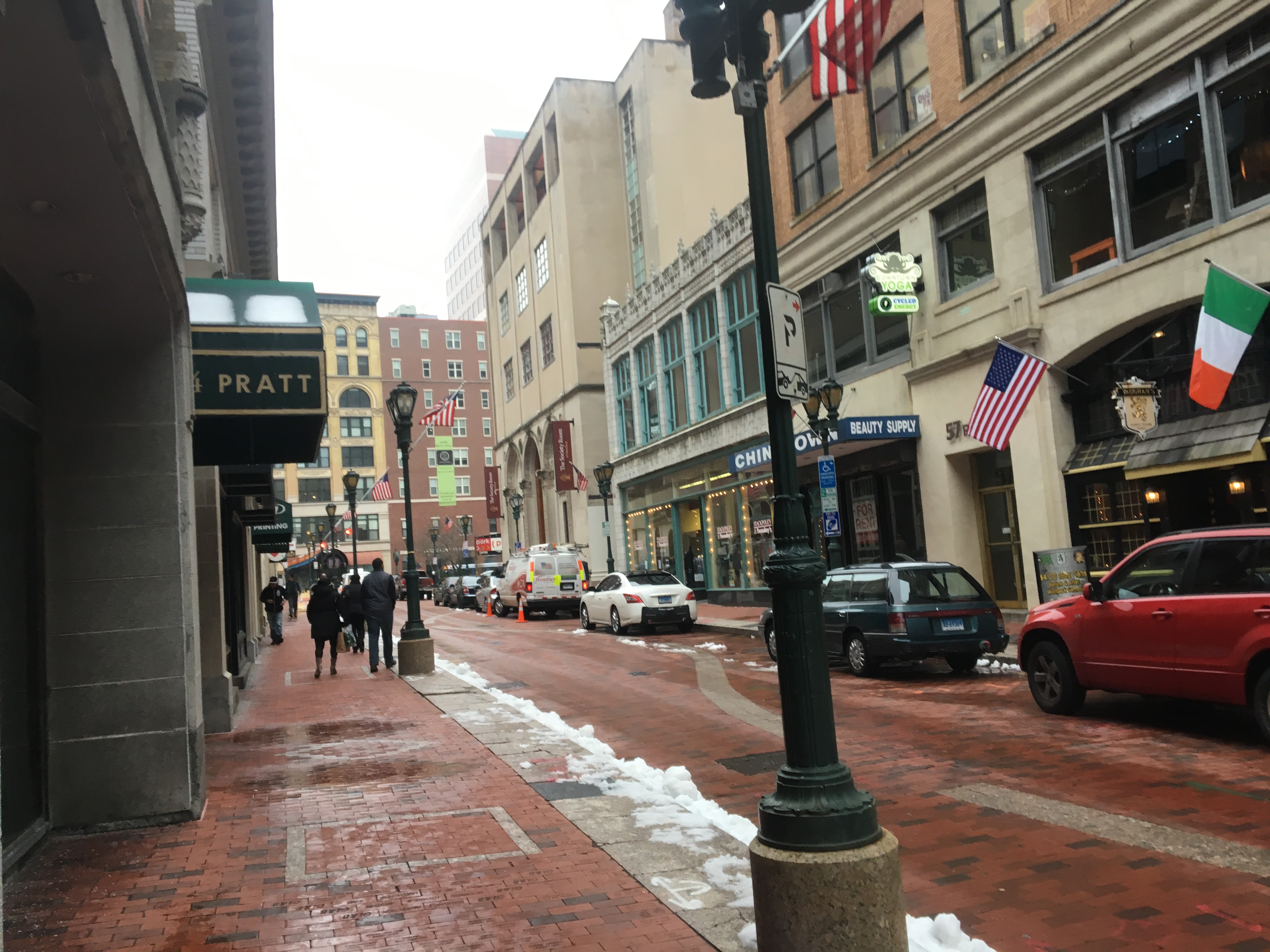
- Pratt Street is a "historic, one-block, quasi-pedestrian mall" in the heart of downtown Hartford.
- Country: United States
- State: Connecticut
- NECTA: Hartford
- Region: Capitol Region
- Time zone: EST

Downtown Hartford, Connecticut is the primary business district of the city, and the center of Connecticut's state government. Because of the large number of insurance companies headquartered there, Hartford is known as the "Insurance Capital of the World".

== Historic places ==
Main Street

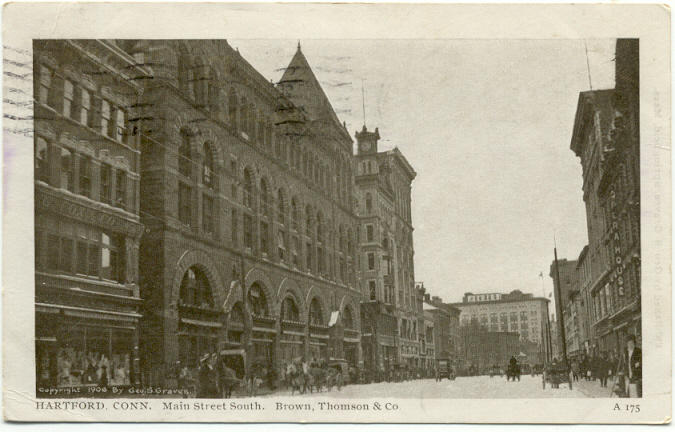
1908

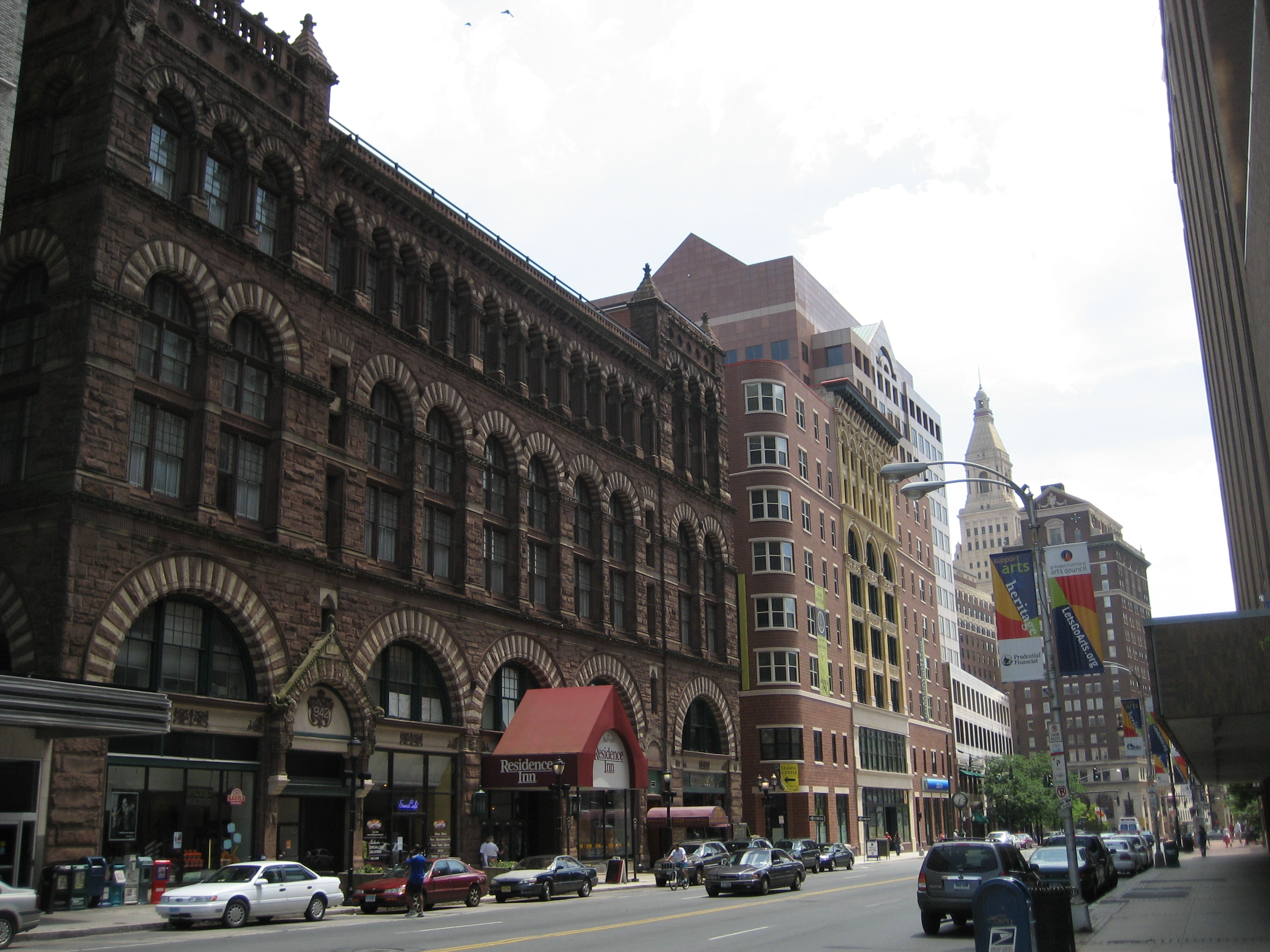
2007

Note H.H. Richardson's Cheney Building at left

The downtown area includes eight historic districts listed on the National Register of Historic Places: Ann Street Historic District; Buckingham Square Historic District; Department Store Historic District; Downtown North Historic District; Elm Street Historic District; High Street Historic District; Main Street Historic District No. 2; and Pratt Street Historic District.

== Businesses ==
Downtown Hartford is home to many corporations such as The Hartford, Travelers Insurance, Hartford Steam Boiler, The Phoenix Companies, Aetna, and United Technologies Corporation, most of which are housed in office towers constructed over the last 20–30 years. Downtown also serves as the hub for the bus routes of Connecticut Transit Hartford. Union Station is located in the western part of downtown.

Downtown is also home to the Hartford City Hall, the Hartford Public Library, which is undergoing a major expansion and renovation, the Old State House, which is one of the oldest state houses in the nation, the Wadsworth Atheneum which is the oldest public art museum in the country, Travelers Tower, historic Hotel Bond, Bushnell Park, and the Connecticut State Capitol and Legislative Office Complex.

The south downtown area south of Bushnell Park is the site of several imposing buildings built in the early decades of the 20th century as the headquarters for large insurance companies. The Scottish Union and National Insurance Company building, in the Georgian Revival style, was built in 1913. The Renaissance Revival-style Connecticut General Life Insurance Company building, built in 1926, was inspired by the Medici-Riccardi Palace in Florence, Italy.

== Housing ==
Housing

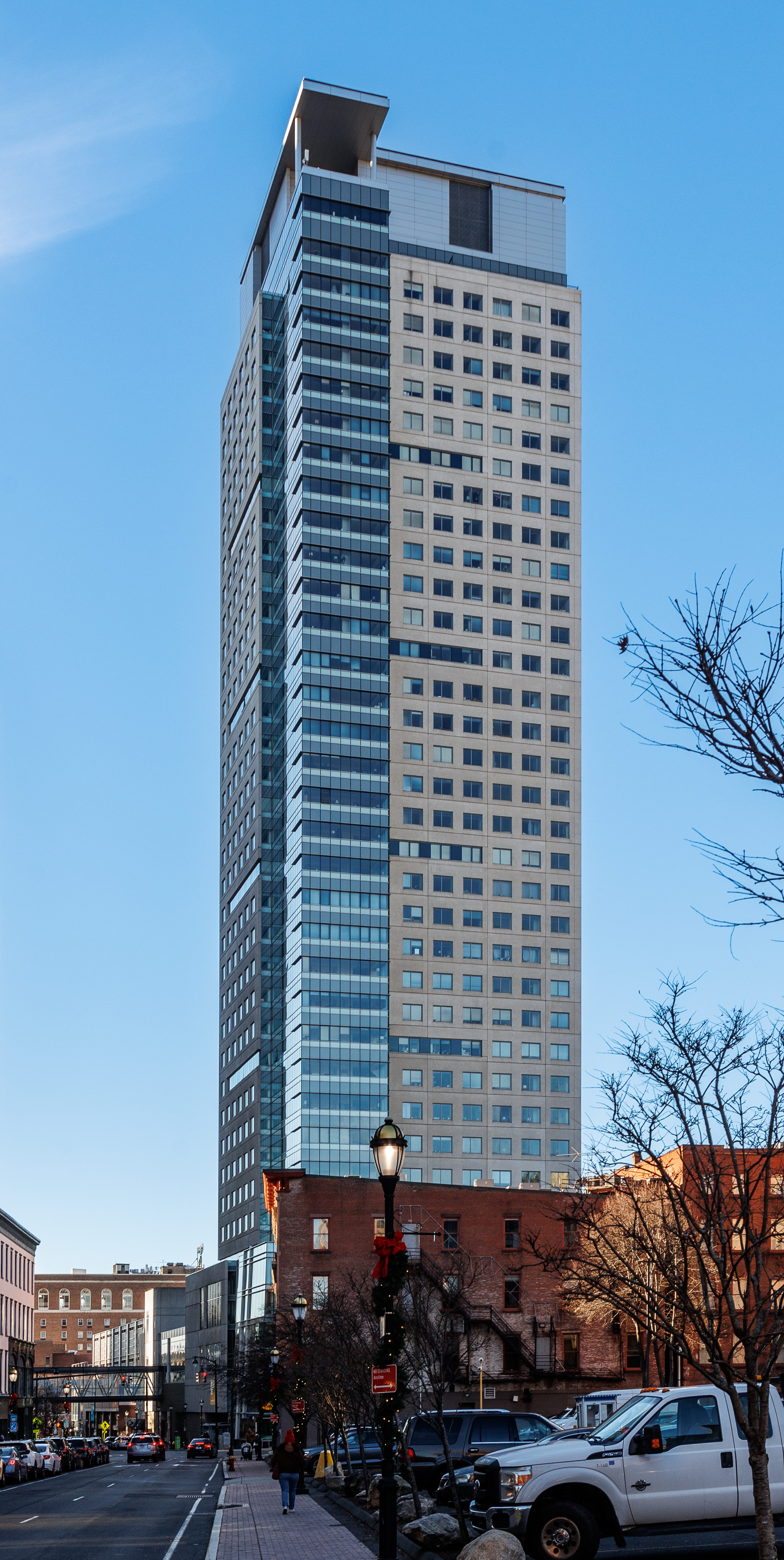
Hartford 21

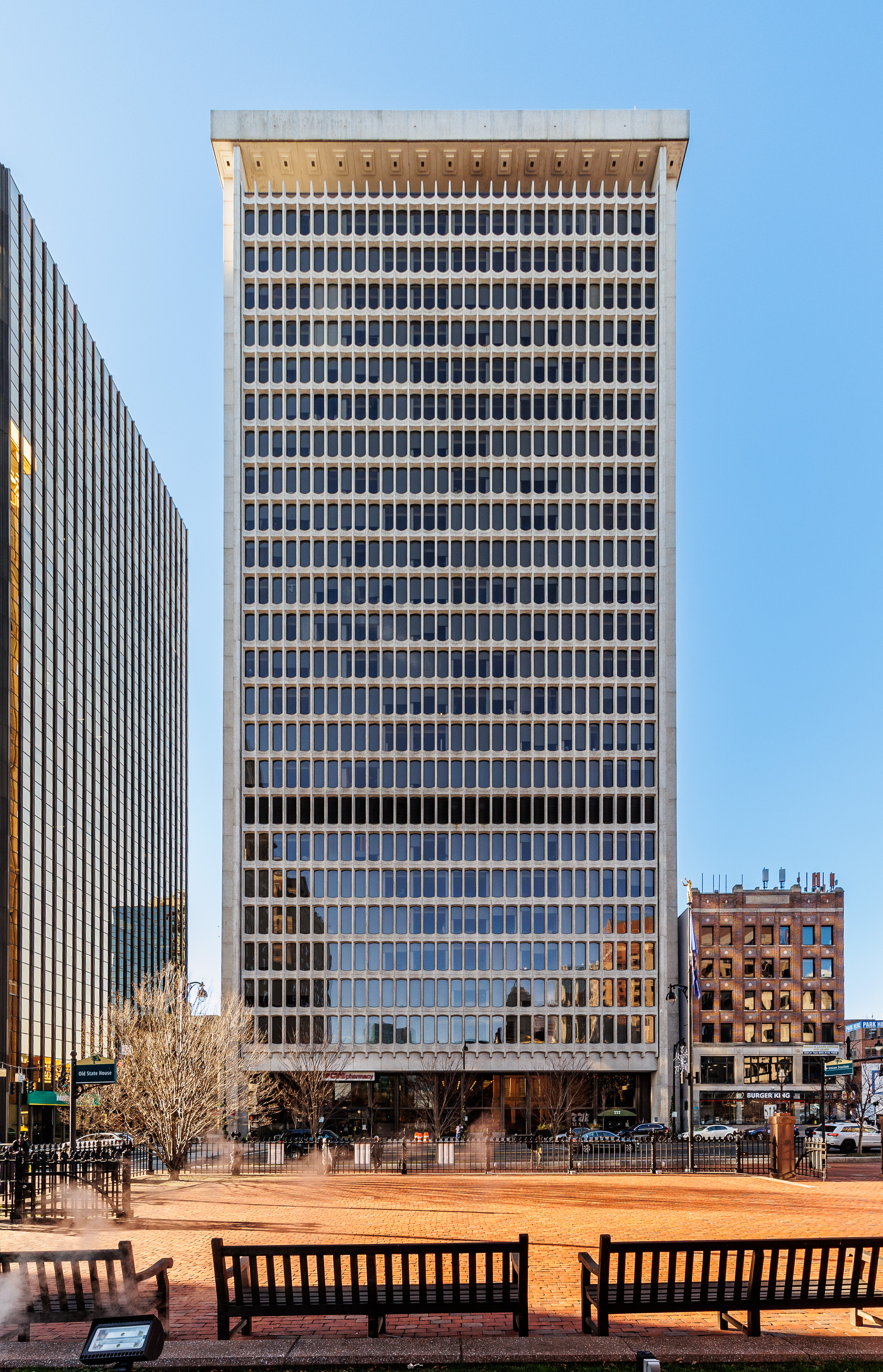
777 Main Street

A major feature of the downtown and the city skyline is Hartford 21, a 36-story apartment tower completed in 2006. Starting in 2014 the 26-story office building at 777 Main Street (formerly the Bank of America Building) was converted into 285 luxury apartments.

== Education ==
Along Main Street, Capital Community College and the Hartford Public Schools offices are located in the 11-story building that until 1993 housed the G. Fox and Company department store. The newly renovated University of Connecticut School of Business is located at Constitution Plaza. At the eastern edge of downtown at Adriaens Landing the Connecticut Convention Center opened in June 2005 near the new Marriott Hartford Hotel.

== Landmarks ==
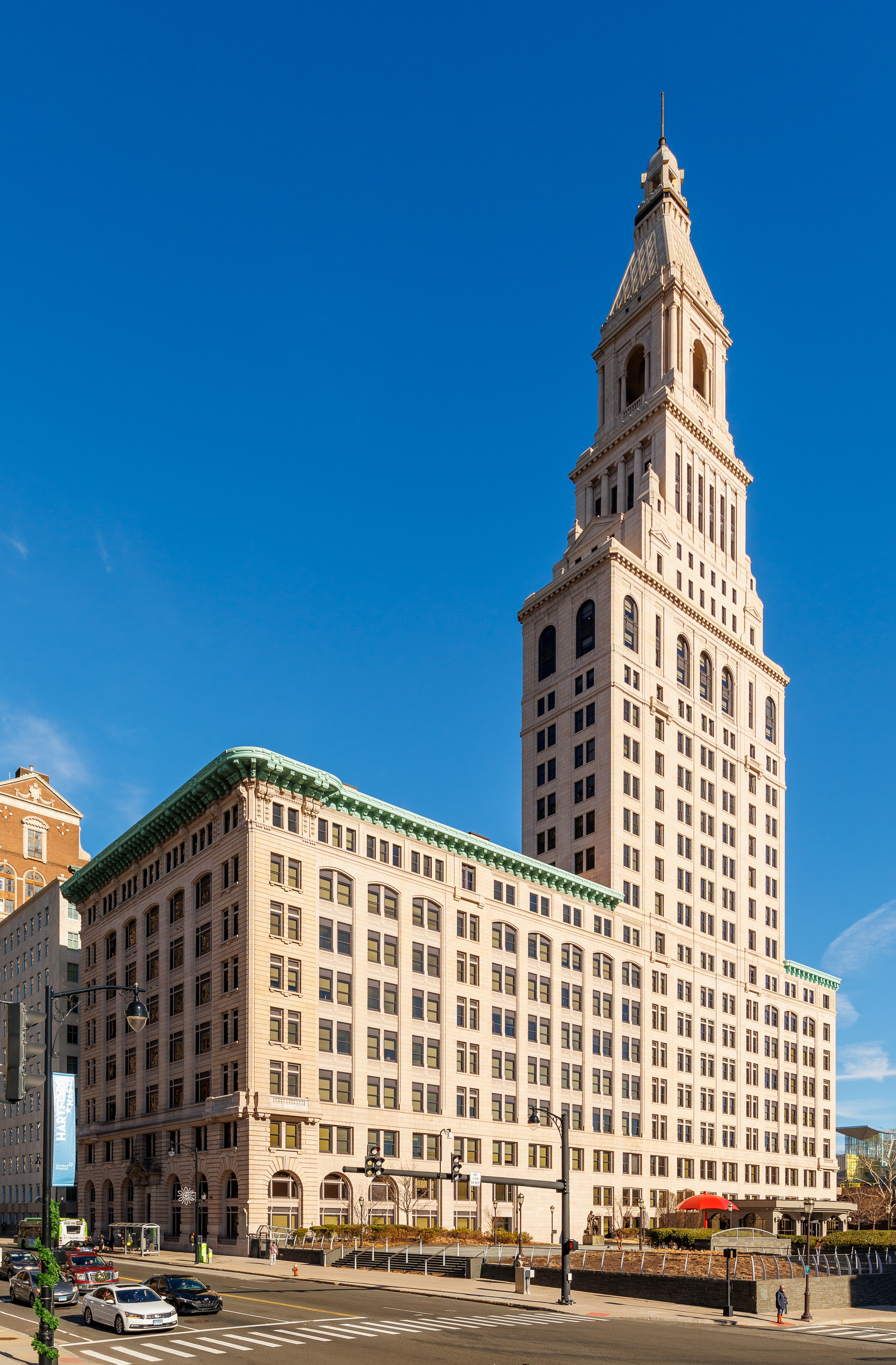
Travelers Tower

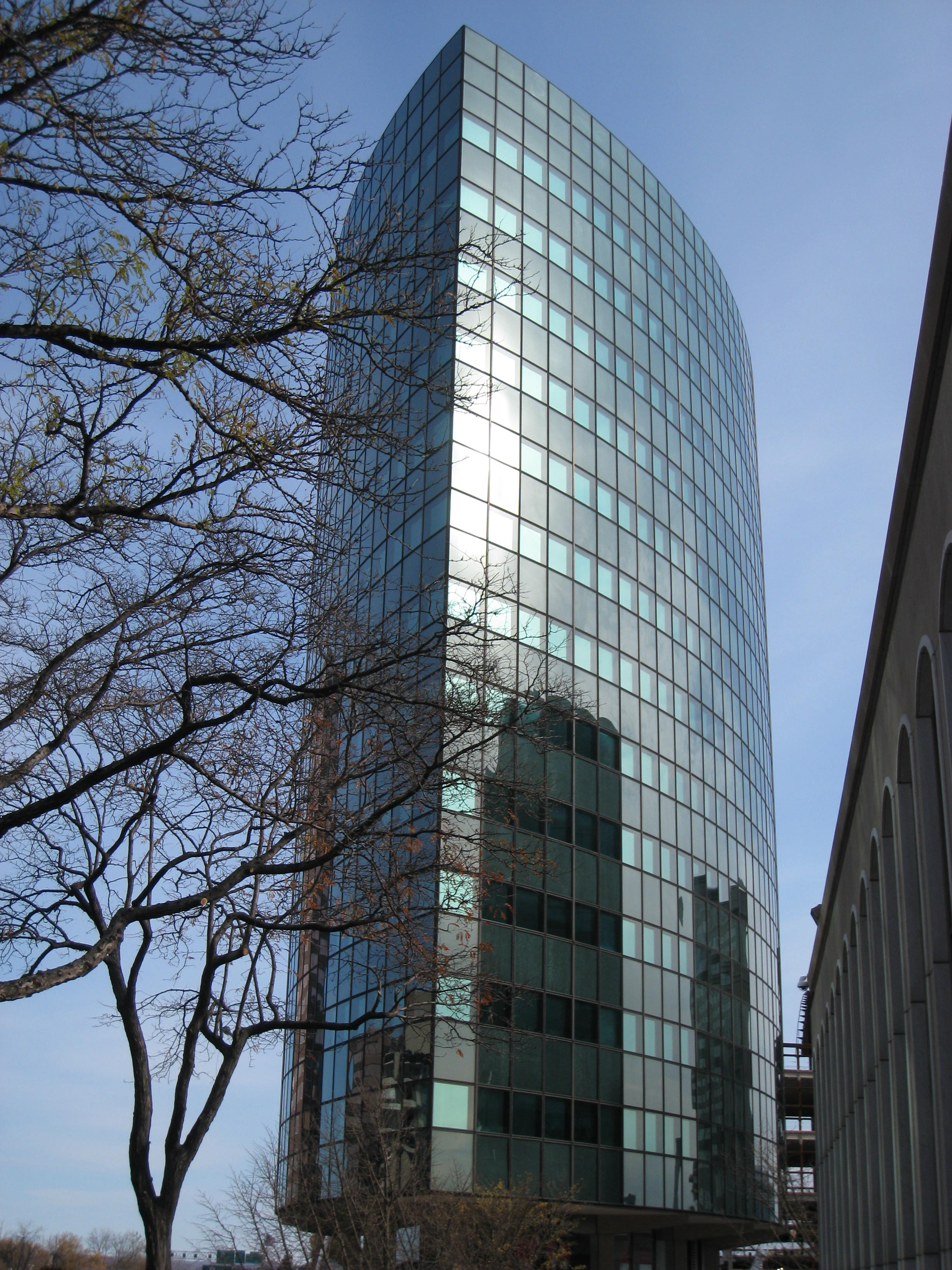
Phoenix Life Insurance Company Building

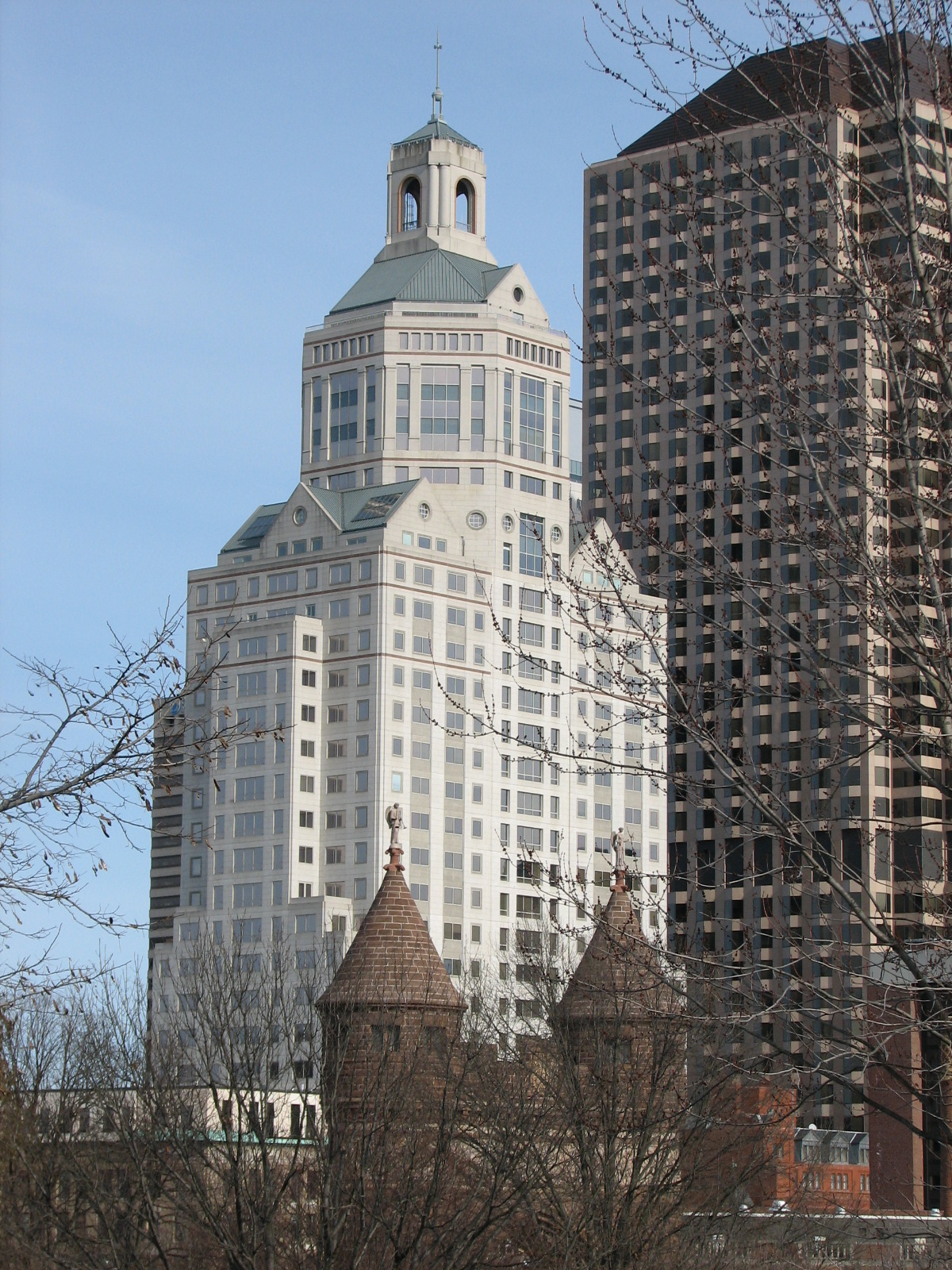
Goodwin Square

== See also ==
- Neighborhoods of Hartford, Connecticut
- List of tallest buildings in Hartford, Connecticut
