= List of tallest buildings in Connecticut =

Skyscrapers in Connecticut
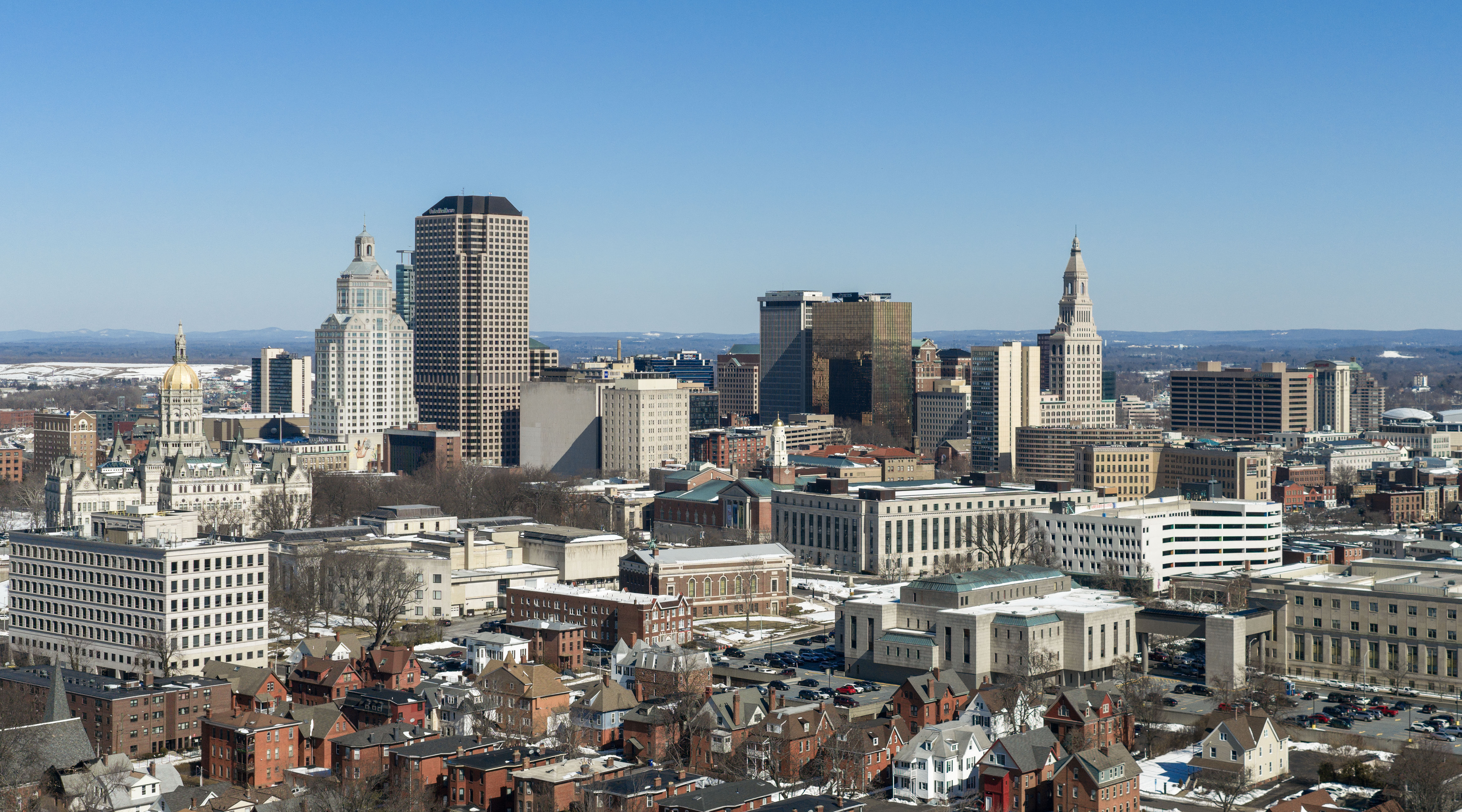
- The skyline of Hartford in 2026
- Population: 3,702,543
- Cities included: Bridgeport, Bristol, Hartford, Ledyard, Montville, New Haven, Stamford
- Tallest building: City Place I (1984)
- Tallest building height: 535 ft (163 m)
- First 150 m+ building: Travelers Tower (1919)

Number of tall buildings
- Taller than 100 m (328 ft): 15
- Taller than 150 m (492 ft): 3

Number of tall buildings — feet
- Taller than 300 ft (91.4 m): 18
- Taller than 400 ft (122 m): 4

This list ranks buildings in the U.S. state of Connecticut that stand over 250 ft (76 m) tall. As of April 2026, there are 15 buildings in Connecticut that stand over 328 ft (100 m).

Since 1984, the tallest building in Connecticut and Hartford has been the 535 ft (163 m) tall, 38-story, City Place I. The 2nd-tallest building in Connecticut is the 527 ft (161 m) tall, 24-story, Travelers Tower which when it was built, was the 8th-tallest building in the world and the 2nd-tallest building in the United States outside of New York City, with only the 548 ft (167 m) tall, Philadelphia City Hall being taller. (Note: Churches are excluded in this figure.)

Outside of Hartford, the tallest buildings in the state are the 392 ft (119 m) tall Mohegan Sun Sky Tower in Montville, the 383 ft (117 m) tall Connecticut Financial Center in New Haven, the 383 ft (117 m) tall Otis Research Center in Bristol, the 377 ft (115 m) tall Park Tower Stamford in Stamford, the 343 ft (105 m) tall Fox Tower in Ledyard, and the 268 ft (82 m) tall Bridgeport Center in Bridgeport.

The most recently completed high-rise in the state is the 282 ft (86 m) tall, Atlantic Station West in Stamford, which was built in 2021.

== Tallest buildings ==
This list ranks buildings in Connecticut that stand at least 250 ft (76 m) tall as of April 2026. Spires and other architectural details are included in the height of a building, however, antennas are excluded.

Tallest building in Connecticut upon completion

Rank	Name	Image	Height ft / (m)	Floors	Year	City	Use	Rank in its city	Notes	References
1	City Place I	Tallest building in Connecticut, 535 ft tall	535 ft (163 m)	38	1984	Hartford	Office	1	Tallest building in Connecticut since 1984.; Tallest building in New England outside of Boston.	
2	Travelers Tower	Travelers_Tower_1	527 ft (161 m)	24	1919	Hartford	Office	2	Tallest building in Connecticut from 1919 to 1984.; Upon its completion, it was the 8th-tallest building in the world.	
3	Goodwin Square	Goodwin_Square_c	522 ft (159 m)	30	1989	Hartford	Office	3	Designed by Skidmore, Owings, and Merrill.	
4	Hartford 21	Hartford 21, apartment building at 221 Trumbull St, Hartford, CT	440 ft (130 m)	36	2006	Hartford	Residential	4	Tallest residential building in Connecticut; Designed by Childs Bertman Tseckares.	
5	Mohegan Sun Sky Tower	Mohegan Sun 3 (cropped)	392 ft (119 m)	34	2002	Montville	Hotel	1	Tallest building in Connecticut outside of Hartford.; Designed by Kohn Pedersen Fox.	
6=	Connecticut Financial Center	Connecticut_Financial_Center_(54106458175)	383 ft (117 m)	27	1990	New Haven	Office	1	Tallest building in New Haven.; Built on the former site of the Powell Building.	
6=	Otis Research Center	Elevator_test_tower	383 ft (117 m)	29	1986	Bristol	Industrial	1	Tallest building in Bristol; Designed by HOK.	
8	Park Tower Stamford	Downtown, Stamford, CT, USA - panoramio (cropped)	377 ft (115 m)	35	2009	Stamford	Residential	1	Tallest building in Stamford.; Formerly known as the Trump Parc Stamford.	
9	777 Main Street	777_Main_Street_1	360 ft (110 m)	26	1967	Hartford	Residential	5	Converted from office to residential use in 2015.; Formerly known as the Bank of America Building.	
10	280 Trumbull Street	280_Trumbull_Street,_Hartford,_Connecticut	349 ft (106 m)	28	1984	Hartford	Office	6	Designed by Crang & Boake, and Hirsch & Persch Architects.	
11	Fox Tower	Fox Tower Foxwood Casino (cropped)	343 ft (105 m)	26	2007	Ledyard	Hotel	1	Tallest building in Ledyard.; Originally known as the MGM Grand at Foxwoods.	
12	360 State Street	360_State_Street,_New_Haven,_Connecticut	338 ft (103 m)	31	2010	New Haven	Residential	2	Designed by Becker + Becker.; Tallest building in Connecticut built in the 2010s.	
13	One Financial Plaza	One_Financial_Plaza_October_2025	335 ft (102 m)	26	1975	Hartford	Office	7	Tallest building in Connecticut built in the 1970s.; Also known as the Gold Building.	
14	Hartford Plaza	Hartford_Plaza_4	334 ft (102 m)	22	1967	Hartford	Office	8	Headquarters for The Hartford.; Designed by Skidmore, Owings, and Merrill.	
15	Grand Pequot Tower	Grand Pequot Tower Foxwood Casino (cropped)	328 ft (100 m)	19	1997	Ledyard	Hotel/Casino	2	The building is rated a four on the AAA Diamond Program.	
16	Knights of Columbus Tower	Knights_of_Columbus_headquarters_straightened	321 ft (98 m)	23	1969	New Haven	Office	3	Headquarters for the Knights of Columbus organization.	
17	One Corporate Center	One_Corporate_Center,_Hartford,_Connecticut	305 ft (93 m)	23	1981	Hartford	Office	9	Also known as the Stilts Building.	
18	One State Street	One_State_Street,_Hartford,_Connecticut	300 ft (91 m)	24	1983	Hartford	Office	10	Designed by Skidmore, Owings, and Merrill.	
19	One Landmark Square	Landmark building in Stamford CT	295 ft (90 m)	21	1973	Stamford	Office	2	Designed by Victor Hanna Bisharat.	
20	Connecticut State Capitol	MMDA-Photos_-_2020-05-03_-_Connecticut_State_Capitol,_at_Hartford,_Connecticut,_USA	287 ft (87 m)	6	1878	Hartford	Government	11	Designed by Richard Michell Upjohn.	
21	Cathedral of St. Joseph	Cathedral of Saint Joseph in Hartford, Connecticut	284 ft (87 m)	7	1962	Hartford	Religious	12	Tallest church in Connecticut.	
22=	Atlantic Station	Atlantic_Station_Stamford_2	282 ft (86 m)	26	2017	Stamford	Residential	3=	Tallest building in Stamford built in the 2010s.	
22=	Atlantic Station West	Atlantic_Station_West	282 ft (86 m)	26	2021	Stamford	Residential	3=	Tallest building in Connecticut to be built in the 2020s.	
24	One Century Tower	One_Century_Tower_in_New_Haven,_Connecticut	280 ft (85 m)	19	1990	New Haven	Office	4	Designed by Cesar Pelli & Associates.	
25	City Place II	Office building in Hartford	273 ft (83 m)	18	1989	Hartford	Office	13	The building shares a lobby with City Place I.	
26	195 Church Street	195 Church Street in New Haven	270 ft (82 m)	18	1974	New Haven	Office	5	Designed by William Pedersen.	
27	Bridgeport Center	Bridgeport Center Bridgeport, CT skyline (cropped)	268 ft (82 m)	18	1989	Bridgeport	Office	1	Formerly the headquarters of People's United Financial.	
28=	Bushnell Tower	Bushnell_Tower,_Hartford,_Connecticut	262 ft (80 m)	27	1969	Hartford	Residential	14	Designed by Pei Cobb Freed & Partners.	
28=	The Beacon South Tower	2 Stamford Harbor Point Marina (cropped)	262 ft (80 m)	22	2015	Stamford	Residential	5	Designed by EDI International.	
30=	2 Park Place	2_Park_Place,_Hartford,_Connecticut	257 ft (78 m)	25	1986	Hartford	Residential	15=	Twin tower of 24 Park Place.	
30=	24 Park Place	24_Park_Place,_Hartford,_Connecticut	257 ft (78 m)	25	1986	Hartford	Residential	15=	Twin tower of 2 Park Place.	
30=	One Constitution Plaza	One_Constitution_Plaza,_Hartford,_Connecticut	257 ft (78 m)	20	1963	Hartford	Office	15=	Designed by Kahn & Jacobs.	
30=	Stamford Hospital Patient Tower	Stamford Hospital (cropped)	257 ft (78 m)	11	2016	Stamford	Hospital	6	Designed by EYP Health.	
34	The Beacon North Tower	1 Stamford Harbor Point Marina (cropped)	255 ft (78 m)	21	2015	Stamford	Residential	7	Designed by EDI International.	
35=	Connecticut River Plaza North Building	Connecticut River Plaza North Building Connecticut River Plaza 1 (cropped)	252 ft (77 m)	18	1984	Hartford	Office	18=	One of the two Connecticut River Plaza towers.	
35=	State House Square Tower 2	Constitution Plaza 3 (cropped)	252 ft (77 m)	17	1987	Hartford	Office	18=	One of the two State House Square towers.	
37=	Kline Biology Tower	Kline_Biology_Tower_October_2025_b	250 ft (76 m)	16	1966	New Haven	Education	6	Designed by Philip Johnson.; 60th-tallest educational building in the world.	
37=	Summer House	A building in Stamford	250 ft (76 m)	21	2016	Stamford	Residential	8	Designed by Lessard Design.	

== Tallest building by city ==
This list ranks cities in Connecticut by their tallest building. Only cities with a tallest building over 200 ft (61 m) tall are on this list.

City	Name	Image	Height ft / (m)	Floors	Year	Use	References
Hartford	City Place I	City Place I, 185 Asylum Street, Hartford, Connecticut. Viewed from Bushnell Park.	535 ft (163 m)	38	1984	Office	
Montville	Mohegan Sun Sky Tower	Sky_Tower,_Mohegan_Sun,_Uncasville,_CT_(cropped)	392 ft (119 m)	34	2002	Hotel	
New Haven	Connecticut Financial Center	Connecticut_Financial_Center,_New_Haven	383 ft (117 m)	27	1990	Office	
Bristol	Otis Research Center	Elevator test tower (cropped)	383 ft (117 m)	29	1986	Industrial	
Stamford	Park Tower Stamford	Stamford Skyline 2018 (cropped)	377 ft (115 m)	35	2009	Residential	
Ledyard	Fox Tower	Fox Tower Foxwood Casino (cropped)	343 ft (105 m)	26	2007	Hotel	
Bridgeport	Bridgeport Center	Bridgeport_Center_Bridgeport,_CT_skyline_(cropped)	268 ft (82 m)	18	1989	Office	
Waterbury	Waterbury Republican-American Building	Waterbury, Connecticut 2 (cropped)	245 ft (75 m)	3	1909	Office	
East Hartford	111 Founders Plaza	111 Founders Plaza Hartford, Connecticut skyline (cropped)	244 ft (74 m)	19	1972	Office	
Greenwich	Second Congregational Church	Second_Congregational_Church_of_Greenwich	217 ft (66 m)	3	1858	Religious	
Norwich	Cathedral of St. Patrick	Cathedral of Saint Patrick, Norwich, Connecticut	216 ft (66 m)	4	1879	Religious	
Middletown	Middlesex Corporate Center	Middlesex Corporate Center Middletown CT river skyline (cropped)	211 ft (64 m)	12	1989	Office	
Shelton	The Renaissance		204 ft (62 m)	17	2008	Residential	

== Tallest under construction, approved and proposed ==
This lists buildings that are under construction, approved for construction or proposed for construction in Connecticut.

Name	Height* ft (m)	Floors*	Year* (est.)	City	Status	Notes	Use	References
677-707 Washington boulevard	423 (129)	34		Stamford	Approved	Will be the tallest building in Stamford.	Mixed use	
3 Landmark Square	320 (98)	31		Stamford	Approved	Will be the third tallest building in Stamford.	Residential	
110-118 Congress Street	? ft (? m)	22		Bridgeport	Approved	Would be the tallest building in Bridgeport.	Residential	
Hartford Hospital Tower	? ft (? m)	14	2031	Hartford	Approved	Will be the tallest building on the Hartford Hospital campus.	Hospital	

* Table entries with dashes (—) indicate that information regarding building heights, floor counts, or dates of completion has not yet been released.

== See also ==
- List of tallest buildings in Hartford
- List of tallest buildings in New Haven
