= List of tallest buildings in Hartford =

This article lists the tallest buildings in the US city of Hartford, Connecticut, that are at least 61 meters (200 feet) in height. The tallest building in Hartford is the commercial office building City Place I, a 163-meter skyscraper with 38 floors.

Tall Buildings in Hartford

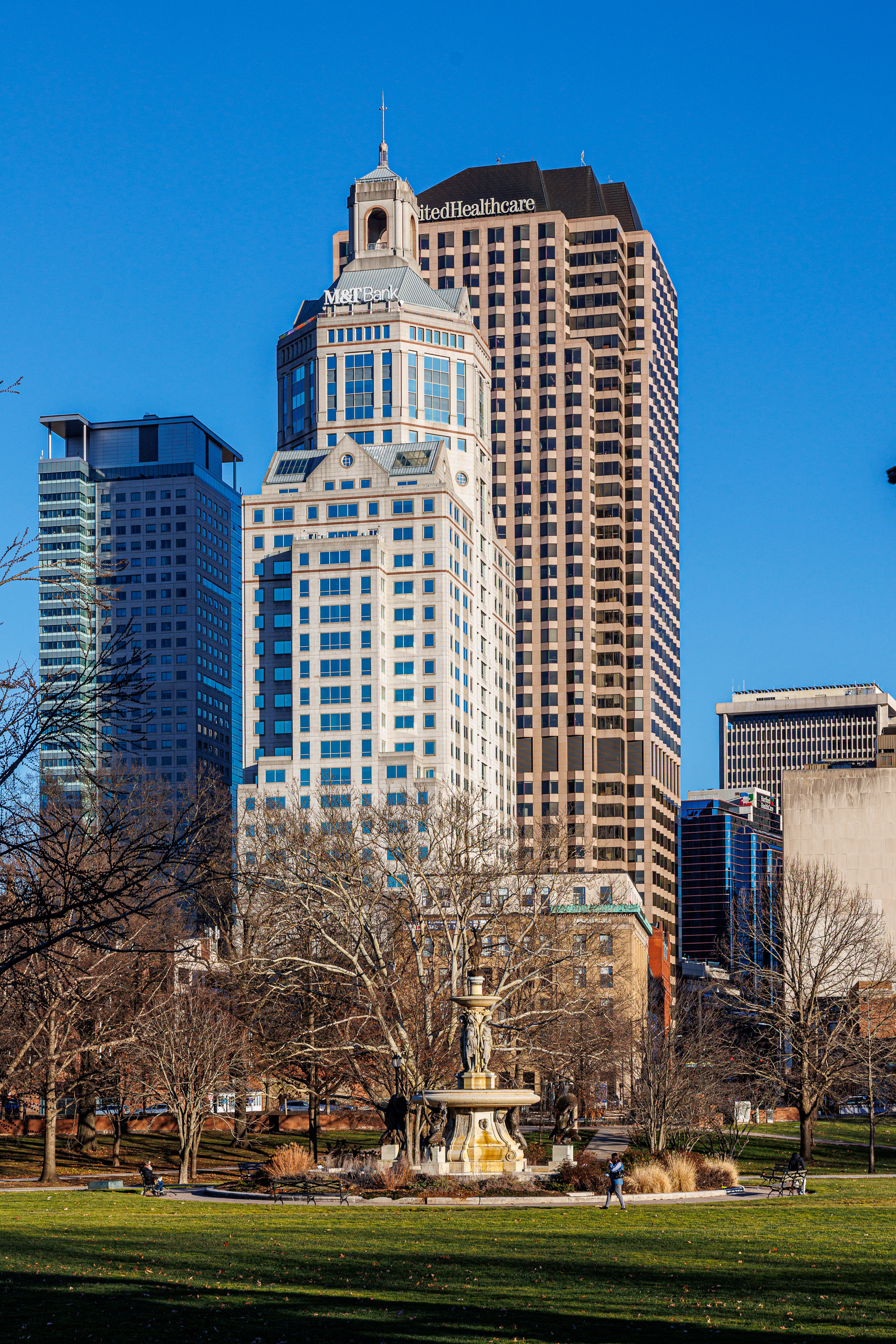
L to R: Hartford 21,
Goodwin Square,
City Place I,
and 777 Main

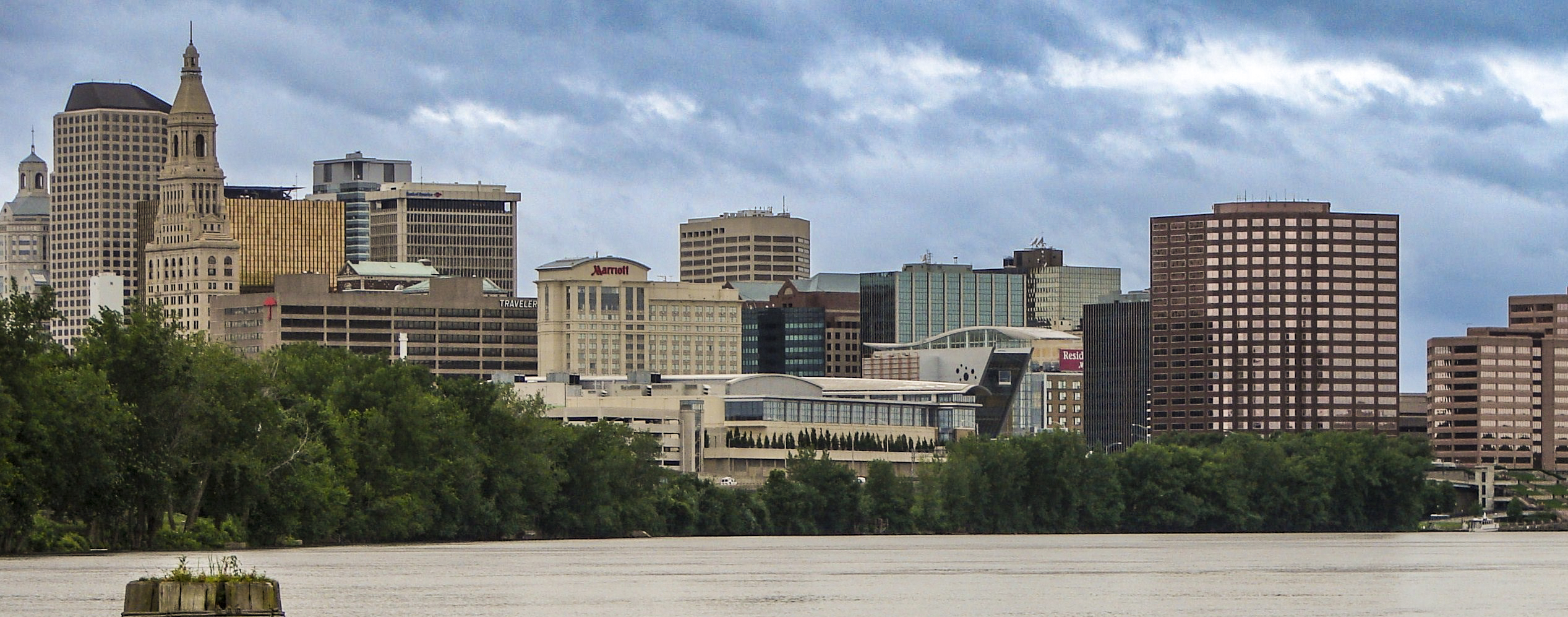
Skyline of Hartford from the Connecticut River

== Tallest buildings ==
| Rank | Name | Image | Height ft (m) | Floors | Year | Notes | Use |
|---|---|---|---|---|---|---|---|
| 1 | City Place I | | 535 (163) | 38 | 1984 | Also the tallest building in Connecticut and tallest in New England outside of Boston; Part of the City Place complex | Office |
| 2 | Travelers Tower | | 527 (161) | 24 | 1919 | Part of the Travelers Complex | Office |
| 3 | Goodwin Square | | 522 (160) | 30 | 1989 | Office tower was built into the historic Goodwin Hotel | Office |
| 4 | Hartford 21 | | 440 (134) | 36 | 2006 | Built on the site of the former Civic Center Mall | Residential |
| 5 | 777 Main Street | | 360 (110) | 26 | 1967 | Formerly known as the Fleet Bank Building and the Bank of America Building | Residential |
| 6 | 280 Trumbull Street | | 349 (106) | 28 | 1984 | | Office |
| 7 | One Financial Plaza | One_Financial_Plaza_October_2025 | 335 (102) | 26 | 1975 | Also known as the Gold Building | Office |
| 8 | Hartford Plaza | Hartford_Plaza_3 | 334 (102) | 22 | 1967 | Headquarters of The Hartford Financial Services Group | Office |
| 9= | 2 Park Place | | 309 (94) | 25 | 1987 | Twin tower of 24 Park Place | Residential |
| 9= | 24 Park Place | | 309 (94) | 25 | 1987 | Twin tower of 2 Park Place | Residential |
| 11 | One Corporate Center | | 305 (93) | 23 | 1981 | | Office |
| 12 | One State Street | | 297 (91) | 24 | 1983 | | Offices |
| 13 | Connecticut State Capitol | | 287 (87) | 6 | 1878 | Contains the office of the Governor of Connecticut and the Connecticut General Assembly | Government |
| 14 | Cathedral of Saint Joseph | | 284 (87) | 7 | 1962 | Mother church of the Roman Catholic Archdiocese of Hartford | Religious (Cathedral) |
| 15 | Hilton Hartford | Hotel in Hartford | 281 (86) | 21 | 1975 | | Hotel |
| 16 | Hartford Marriott Downtown | | 272 (83) | 22 | 2005 | | Hotel |
| 17 | Bushnell Tower | | 263 (80) | 28 | 1969 | | Residential |
| 18 | One Constitution Plaza | | 257 (78) | 20 | 1963 | Part of the Constitution Plaza complex | Office |
| 19 | The Stark Building | | 246 (75) | 18 | 1921 | Formerly the Hartford Trust Company Building | Office |
| 20 | 55 On The Park | | 225 (69) | 12 | 1931 | Formerly known as the Southern New England Telephone Company Building | Residential |
| 21= | Travelers Insurance Company Building | | 223 (68) | 18 | 1928 | Part of the Travelers Complex | Office |
| 21= | City Place II | | 223 (68) | 18 | 1989 | Part of the City Place complex | Office |
| 21= | Connecticut River Plaza North Building | | 223 (68) | 18 | 1984 | Part of Connecticut River Plaza complex | Office |
| 24 | 100 Constitution Plaza | | 218 (66) | 18 | 1961 | Part of the Constitution Plaza complex | Office |
| 25 | The Phoenix Building | | 212 (65) | 14 | 1964 | Part of the Constitution Plaza complex; Headquarters of The Phoenix Companies | Office |
| 26= | 25 Sigourney Street | | 210 (64) | 17 | 1986 | | |
| 26= | 100 Pearl Street | | 210 (64) | 17 | 1988 | | Office |
| 26= | Radisson Hotel Hartford | | 210 (64) | 17 | 1971 | | Hotel |
| 26= | State House Square Tower 1 | | 210 (64) | 17 | 1988 | Part of the State House Square complex | Office |
| 26= | State House Square Tower 2 | | 210 (64) | 17 | 1988 | Part of the State House Square complex | Office |
| 31 | Smith Tower | | 206 (63) | 21 | 1968 | | Residential |
| 32 | SBC Building | | 202 (62) | 10 | 1972 | Built to be expandable up to 18 floors | Office |

== See also ==
- List of tallest buildings in Connecticut
