= Building at 83–85 Sigourney Street =

Historic house in Connecticut, United States

- U.S. National Register of Historic Places
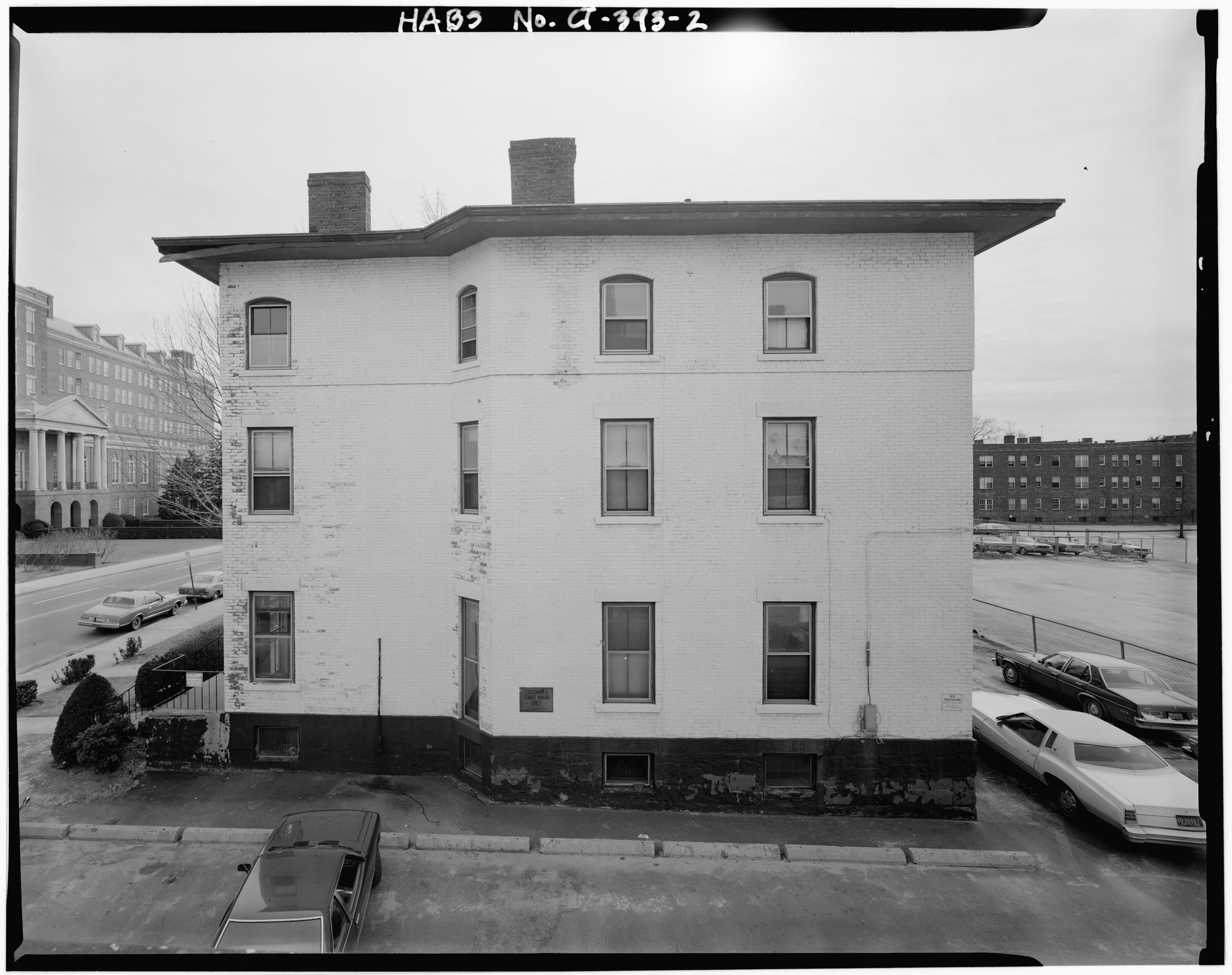
- View south - 83–85 Sigourney Street

- Location within Connecticut Location within the United States
- Location: 83–85 Sigourney Street, Hartford, Connecticut
- Coordinates: 41°45′59″N 72°41′33″W
- Area: less than one acre
- Built: 1865
- Architectural style: Italianate
- Demolished: after 1979
- MPS: Asylum Hill MRA
- NRHP reference No.: 79002679
- Added to NRHP: November 29, 1979

83–85 Sigourney Street in Hartford, Connecticut was an Italianate style double brick house. Built in 1865, it was the oldest surviving residential building on the southern part of Sigourney Street in the city's Asylum Hill neighborhood. It was listed on the National Register of Historic Places in 1979, at a time when there were no known threats to the building. A modern building, housing the former Connecticut Culinary Institute, was built on the site in 1981 and now stands at 85 Sigourney Street; it is the Hartford campus of the Lincoln Culinary Institute, and is part of the Lincoln Group of Schools.

== Description and history ==
83–85 Sigourney Street stood on the west side of Sigourney Street, a busy north–south artery west of Downtown Hartford, across the street from the main headquarters of Aetna Insurance Company. As described in 1979, it stood alone, surrounded by parking lots of the insurance company. It was a brick building, three stories in height, with a flat roof. Its front facade was four bays wide, with its ground floor altered in the 20th century for commercial use and lacking significant ornament. The surviving first and second floor windows were set in rectangular openings with stone sills and lintels, the lintels on the front facade peaked. Windows on the third floor were set in segmented-arch openings.

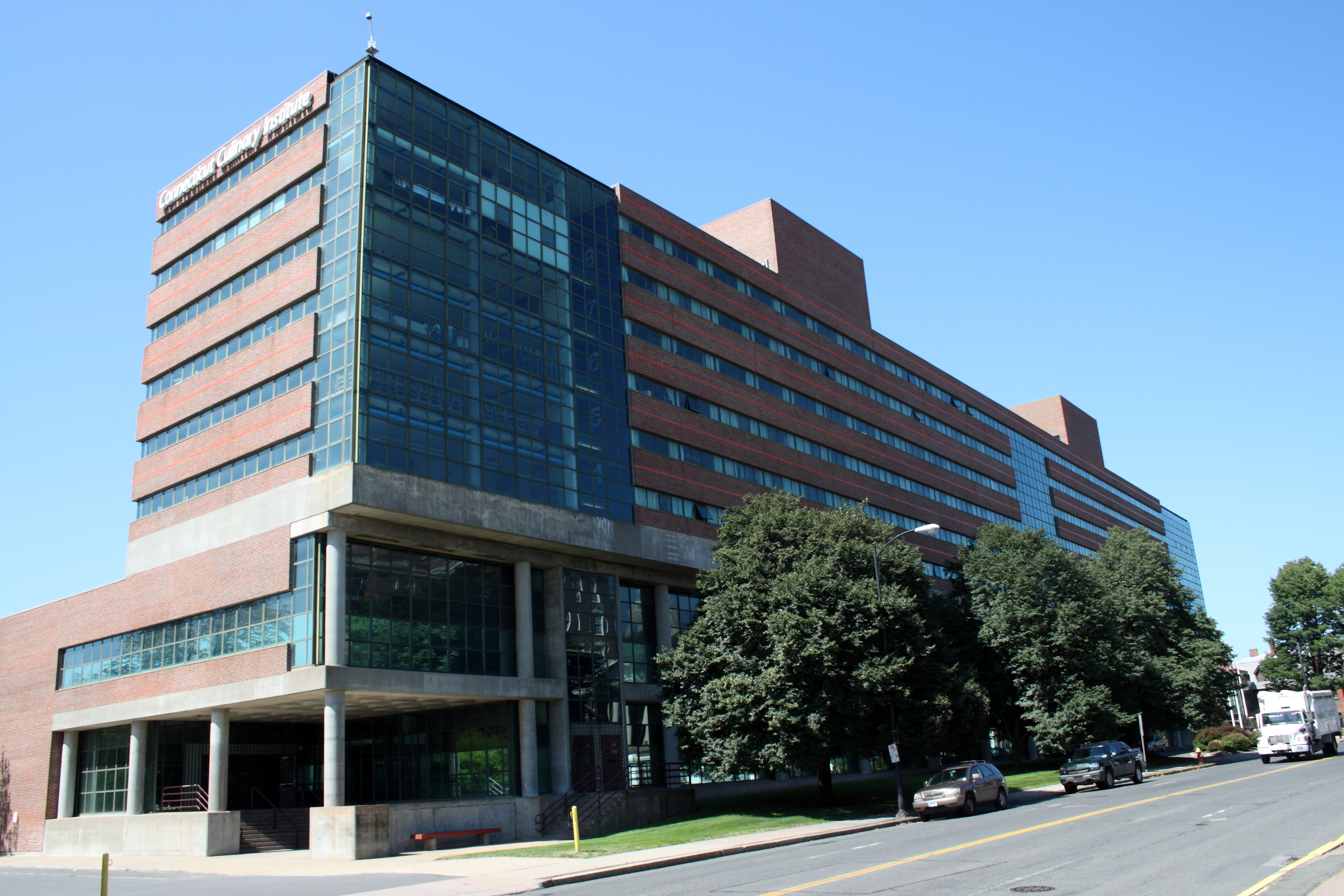
85 Sigourney Street

The house was probably built in about 1865. This type of house was at one time fairly common in the city, although few of them were built in Asylum Hill, an upper-class neighborhood area at the time. This house was the last of its type in Asylum Hill; it was demolished some time after its listing on the National Register in 1979.

== See also ==
- National Register of Historic Places in Hartford, Connecticut
