= One Corporate Centre =

One Corporate Centre or One Corporate Center may refer to:

- One Corporate Center (Hartford, Connecticut), a high-rise building in the United States
- One Corporate Centre (Manila), a high-rise building in the Philippines
