= Hartford 21 =

Building in Hartford, Connecticut

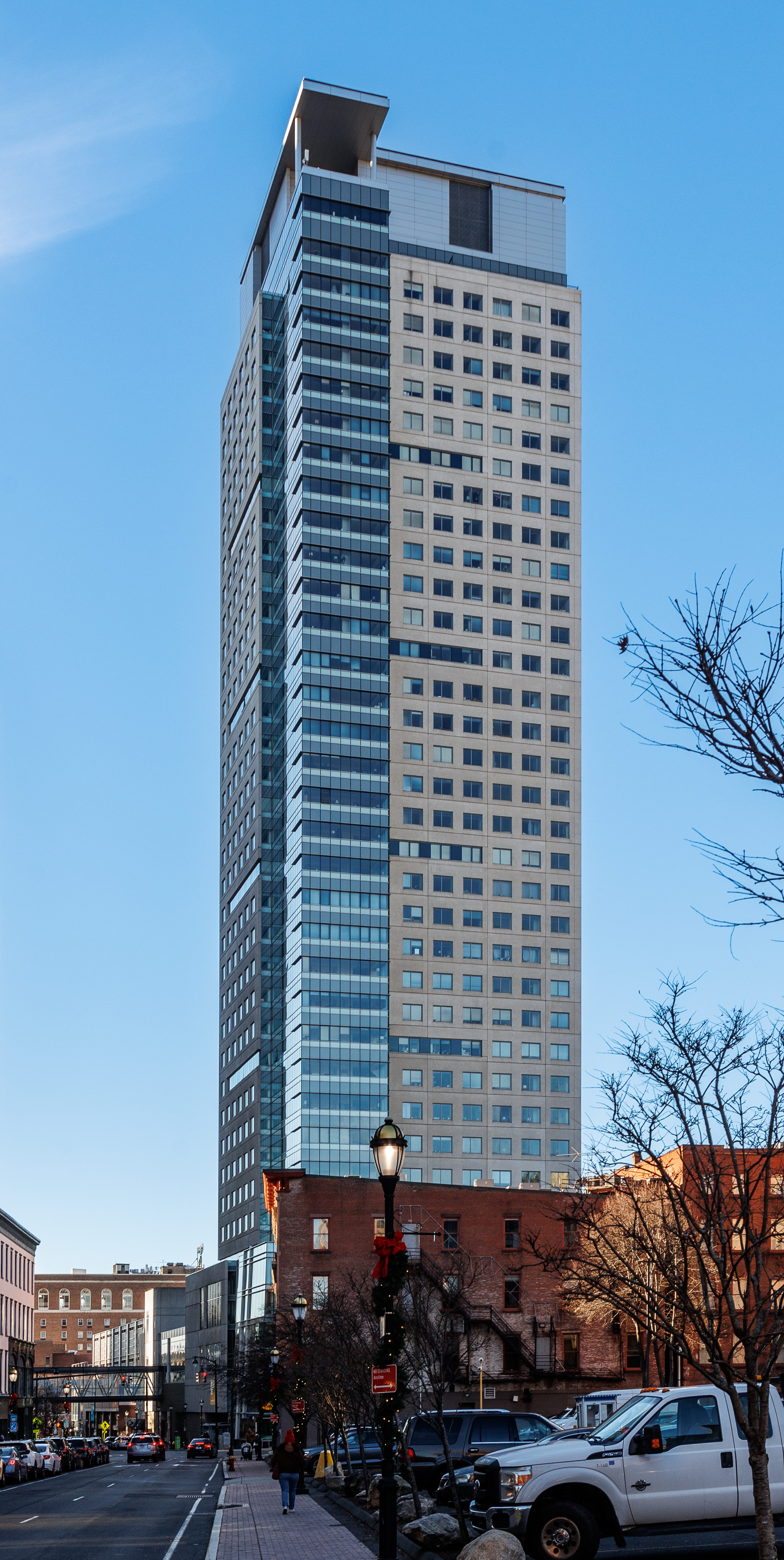

- Location within Connecticut

General information
- Status: Completed
- Type: Rental apartments
- Architectural style: Postmodern
- Location: 221 Trumbull Street; Hartford, Connecticut
- Coordinates: 41.7668°N 72.6766°W
- Construction started: 2004
- Completed: 2006
- Cost: $197.5 million
- Owner: Northland Investment Corporation
- Management: Northland Investment Corporation

Height
- Roof: 134 m (440 ft)
- Top floor: 37

Technical details
- Floor count: 36
- Floor area: 106,412 ft^{2} (9,886.0 m^{2})
- Lifts/elevators: 5 and 8 elevators

Design and construction
- Architecture firm: Childs Bertman Tseckares Inc.
- Developer: CBT Architects
- Structural engineer: Weidlinger Associates
- Main contractor: Turner Construction

Website
- www.hartford21.com

Hartford 21 is a 36-story, 134 m (440 ft) skyscraper located at 211 Trumbull Street in Downtown Hartford, Connecticut. It is the fourth tallest building in Hartford and the fifth in the state.

== Construction and structure ==
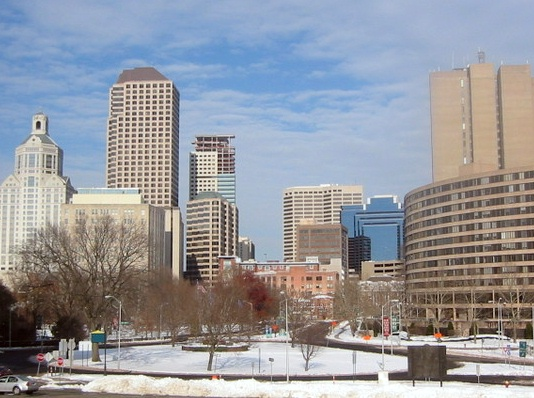
Hartford 21 under construction

Hartford 21 was designed by the Boston-based architectural firm Childs Bertman Tseckares Inc. Construction began in June 2004 and was completed in 2006 by Turner Construction. It cost nearly $200 million to complete with $32.5 million coming in a grant from the state.

There are 36 floors aboveground and three below. The building contains 262 luxury apartments as well as lower level retail and office space. It is the tallest building constructed in Hartford in the 21st century.

== History ==
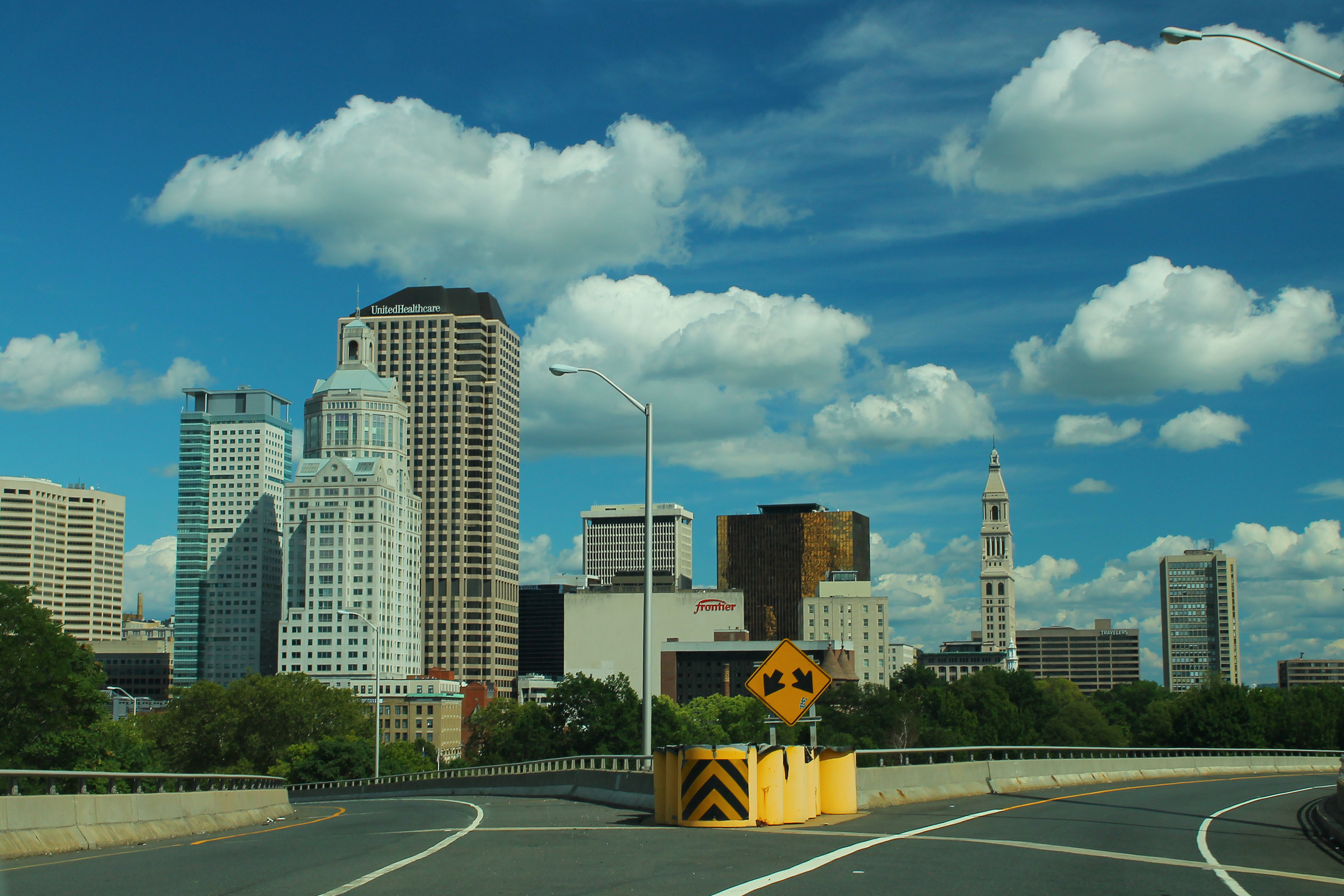
Hartford 21 is second from left

Hartford 21 was completed in 2006, and is purported to be the tallest residential tower between New York City and Boston. It is located adjacent to the PeoplesBank Arena, near where Asylum Street intersects Trumbull Street.

== See also ==
- List of tallest buildings in Hartford
- List of tallest buildings by U.S. state
