= High Street Historic District (Hartford, Connecticut) =

Historic district in Connecticut, United States

- U.S. National Register of Historic Places
- U.S. Historic district
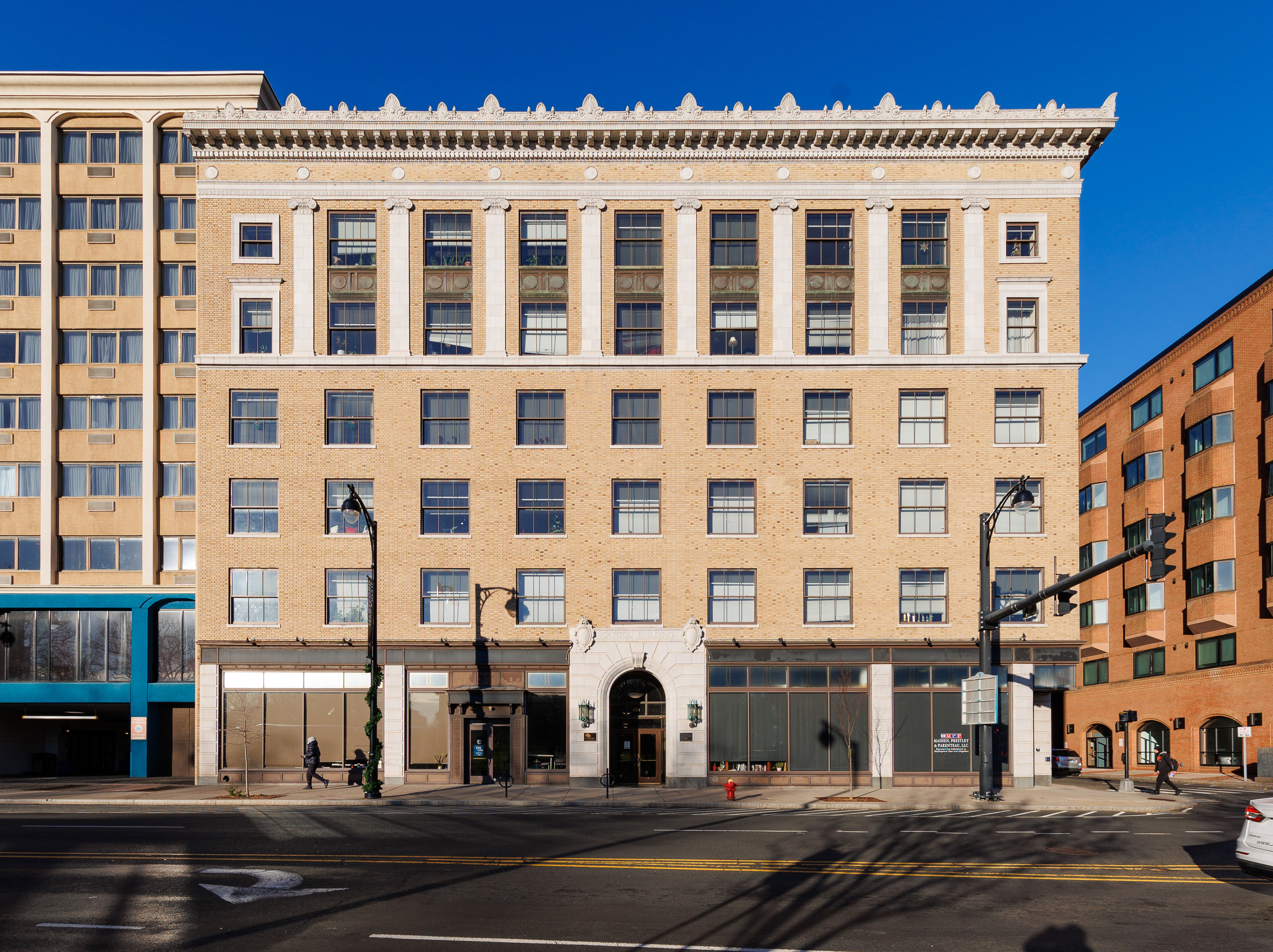
- Capitol Building, aka Hollander Apartments

- Location within Connecticut Location within the United States
- Location: 402-418 Asylum Street, 28 High Street, and 175-189 Allyn Street, Hartford, Connecticut
- Coordinates: 41°46′3″N 72°40′51″W
- Area: 1.1 acres (0.45 ha)
- Built: 1883
- Architect: multiple
- Architectural style: Gothic, Romanesque, Classical Revival
- NRHP reference No.: 98000850
- Added to NRHP: July 8, 1998

The High Street Historic District of Hartford, Connecticut is a 1.1-acre (0.45 ha) historic district that includes three buildings typifying the architectural styles of the late 19th and early 20th centuries in the city. It was listed on the National Register of Historic Places in 1998. The buildings are located at 402-418 Asylum Street, 28 High Street, and 175-189 Allyn Street, and includes the Batterson Block and Judd and Root Building, each individually listed for their architecture.

== Description and history ==
This district consists of three properties on the block of High Street between Allyn and Asylum Streets in Downtown Hartford. Located at the southwest corner of Allyn and High is the Judd and Root Building. To its south, facing High and Asylum Streets, is the Capitol Building. Across High Street from these two buildings, in the center of the block, stands the Batterson Block. The area where these buildings stand was basically residential until the 1860s, when commercial development pressures prompted its transition.

=== Batterson Block ===
The Batterson Block was the first of the three buildings to be built. It is a five-story masonry structure, with load-bearing brick walls finished with stone trim. The ground floor has a commercial storefront with five arched openings in white stone. The second through fourth floors have Romanesque style round-arch windows, with polychrome arches, and columns separating adjacent windows. The fifth floor is a less-stylish later addition. The block was built as a speculative venture c. 1860 by James G. Batterson, whose first business was the New England Granite Company. Batterson went on to found the Travelers Insurance Company in 1863. The architect of this building is unknown; the building is one of the city's most distinctive examples of Gothic and Romanesque architecture.

=== Judd and Root Building ===
The Judd and Root Building was built in 1883 to a Romanesque design by Francis Kimball and Thomas Wisedell, and is the most architecturally elaborate of the three buildings. Its ground floor has multiple storefronts, each articulated by stone piers, with three polychrome arches joining them. The second floor has alternating bands of pale stone and red brick, with paired sash windows in segmented-arch openings topped by flared polychrome lintels. In the upper levels, windows are grouped in pairs or threes, with surrounding decorative brickwork and inset terra cotta panels. Brick corbels are a feature above the upper-floor windows and on the cornice.

=== Capitol Building ===
The Capitol Building is the newest of the three buildings, constructed in 1926 to a Classical Revival design by Thomas Lamb, on the former site of the Park Street Congregational Church. It is a six-story building with a steel frame, concrete floors, and brick exterior with granite trim. The ground floor has storefronts articulated by granite piers, with a center entrance set recessed in a granite arch. The second through fourth floors are plain brick with sash windows set in rectangular openings with stone sills. The fifth and sixth floor bays are articulated by fluted stone pilasters, and the building is crowned by an elaborate projecting cornice with metal cresting.

== See also ==
- National Register of Historic Places listings in Hartford, Connecticut
