= Main Street Historic District No. 2 =

Historic district in Connecticut, United States

- U.S. National Register of Historic Places
- U.S. Historic district
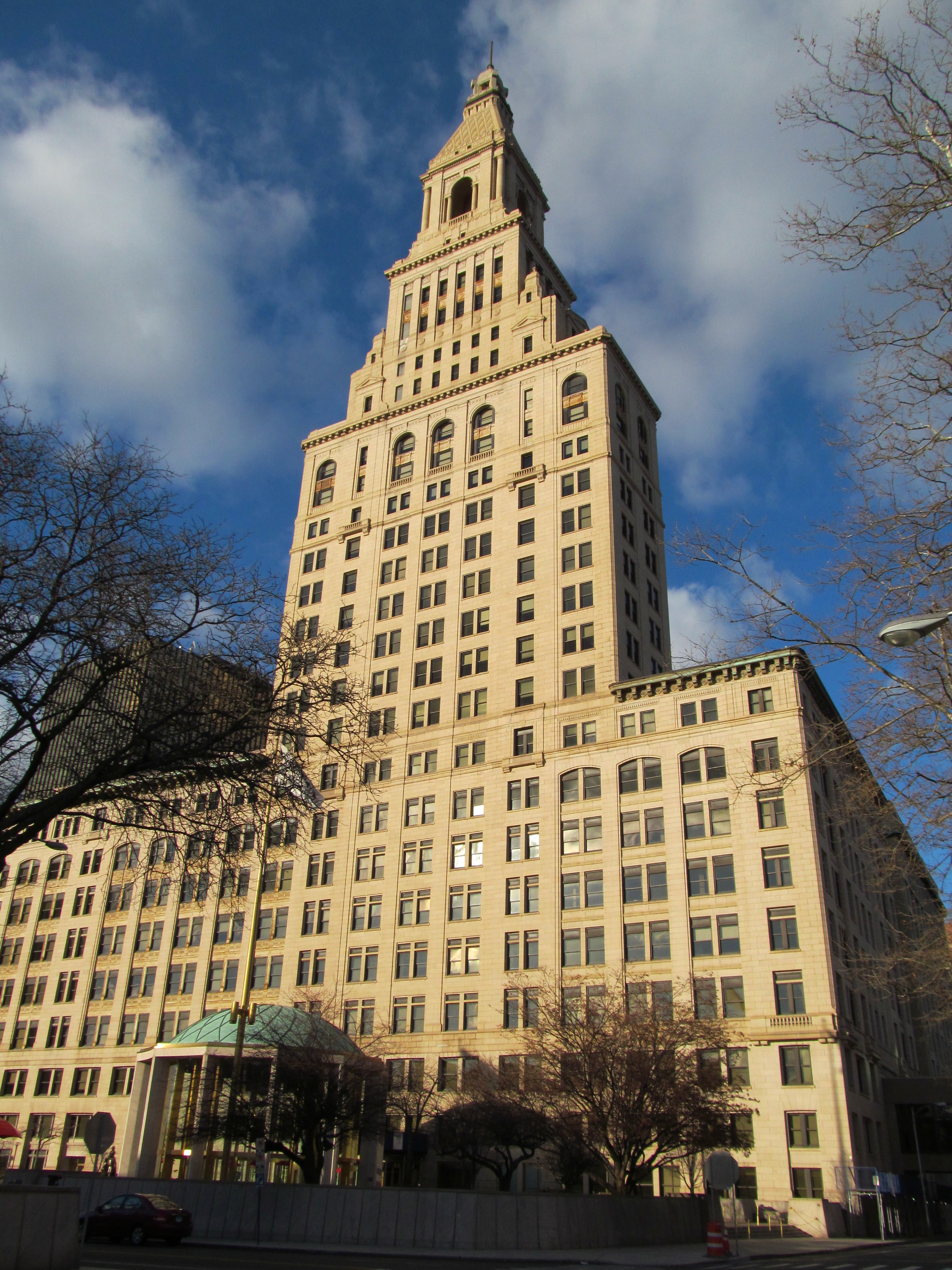
- The Travelers Tower

- Location within Connecticut Location within the United States
- Location: West Main, North Central Row, East Prospect Streets, and North Atheneum Square, Hartford, Connecticut
- Coordinates: 41°45′52″N 72°40′23″W
- Area: 9 acres (3.6 ha)
- Built: 1906
- Architect: Multiple
- Architectural style: Classical Revival, Moderne, Renaissance Revival
- MPS: Hartford Downtown MRA
- NRHP reference No.: 84001272
- Added to NRHP: December 23, 1984

The Main Street Historic District No. 2 is a historic district in Hartford, Connecticut. It encompasses a city block in the city's Downtown noted for its concentration of insurance-related highrise commercial buildings constructed in the early decades of the 20th century. It is visually dominated by the Travelers Tower, completed in 1919 and for many years Hartford's tallest building. The district was listed on the National Register of Historic Places in 1984, at which time it included seven contributing buildings over a nine-acre area.

== Description ==
The historic district is located in the heart of Downtown Hartford, directly north of the Old State House. It covers an L-shaped area extending south from Atheneum Square North, Bounded on the West by Main Street and the North by Central Row. It is bounded on the East by the Modern Phoenix Life Insurance Company Building, and by Grove and Prospect Streets. This area has been a business and commercial area in the City since the late 18th century, and is where a number of nationally significant insurance companies were founded. The buildings along Central Row are architecturally significant, encompassing a transition from early commercial architecture to that of the early 20th century. The district's taller buildings, including the Travelers Tower, were designed by architectural firms based in New York City and already experienced in skyscraper design. Most of the district's buildings are now owned by the Travelers Insurance Company, which continues to be headquartered here.

== Contributing buildings ==
- Putnam Tower, 6 Central Row
- Travelers Office Building, 9-17 Central Row
- Marble Pillar Building, 19-25 Central Row
- Hartford Steam Boiler Inspection & Insurance Co. Building, 56 Prospect Street
- Travelers Office Building, 59 Prospect Street (also known as 26 Grove Street)
- The Travelers Tower, 1 Tower Square

and one noncontributing building:

- Travelers Office Building, 740 Main Street

== See also ==
- National Register of Historic Places listings in Hartford, Connecticut
