= One Financial Plaza (Hartford, Connecticut) =

Building in Hartford, Connecticut

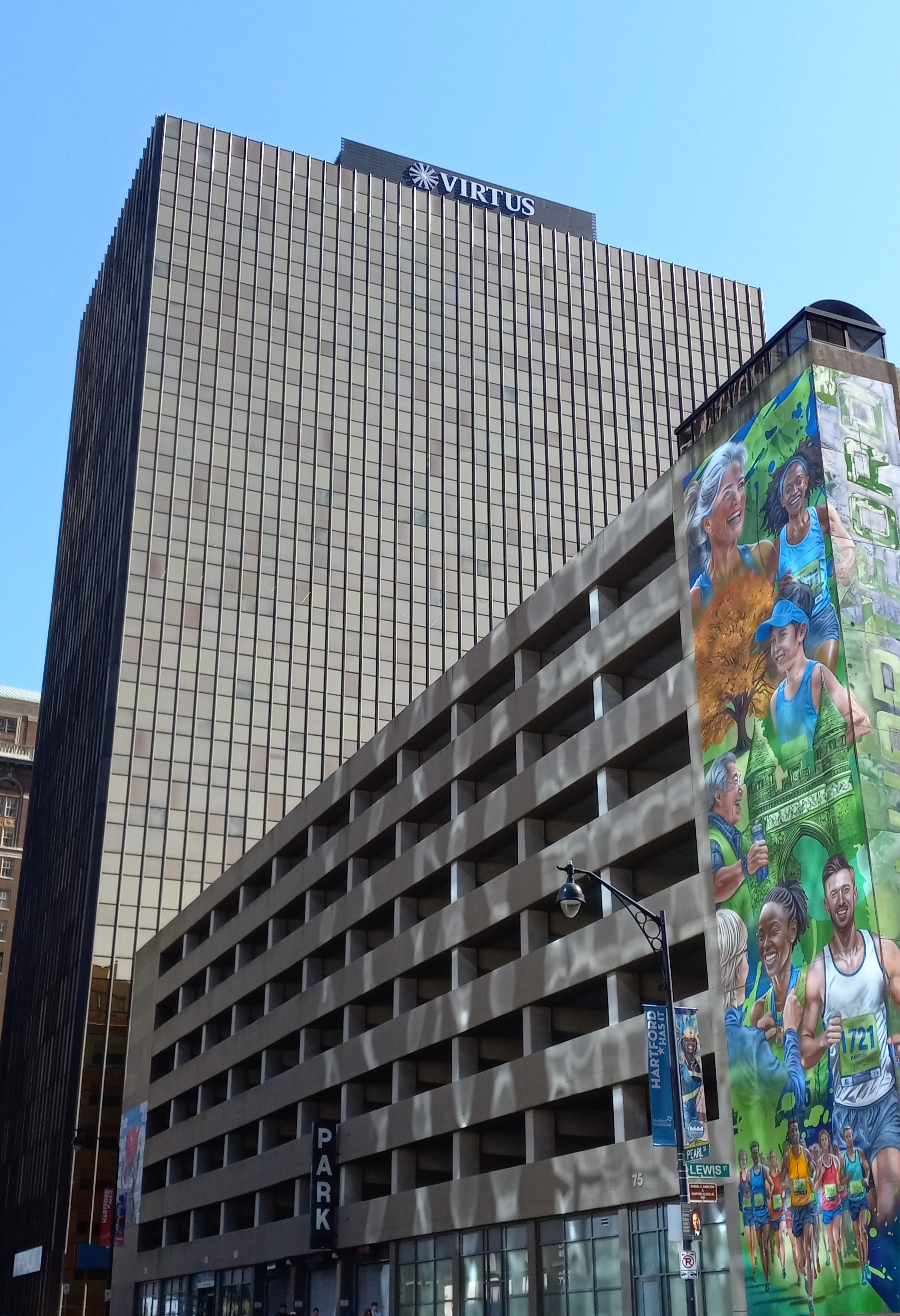
- One Financial Plaza viewed from Pearl Street

- Location within Connecticut One Financial Plaza (Hartford, Connecticut) (the United States)

General information
- Status: Completed
- Architectural style: Modern
- Coordinates: 41°45′55″N 72°40′26″W
- Completed: 1975

Height
- Height: 335 ft (102 m)

Technical details
- Floor count: 26

Design and construction
- Architects: Neuhaus & Taylor

Website
- www.onefinancialplazahartford.com

One Financial Plaza (also referred to as the Gold Building) is a 335 feet (102 m) tall modernist skyscraper in Hartford, Connecticut. It was built in 1975 and it has 26 floors. As of January 2026, it is the 7th tallest building in Hartford and the 12th tallest building in Connecticut. At the time of its completion it was the 3rd tallest building in Hartford and the 3rd tallest building in Connecticut. Notable Tenants include Travelers, KPMG, Martin Collier Phillips Corporation, and Virtus. The building is situated on the corner of Pearl and Main Street.

The building's nickname comes from the gold tinted windows on the building's facade.

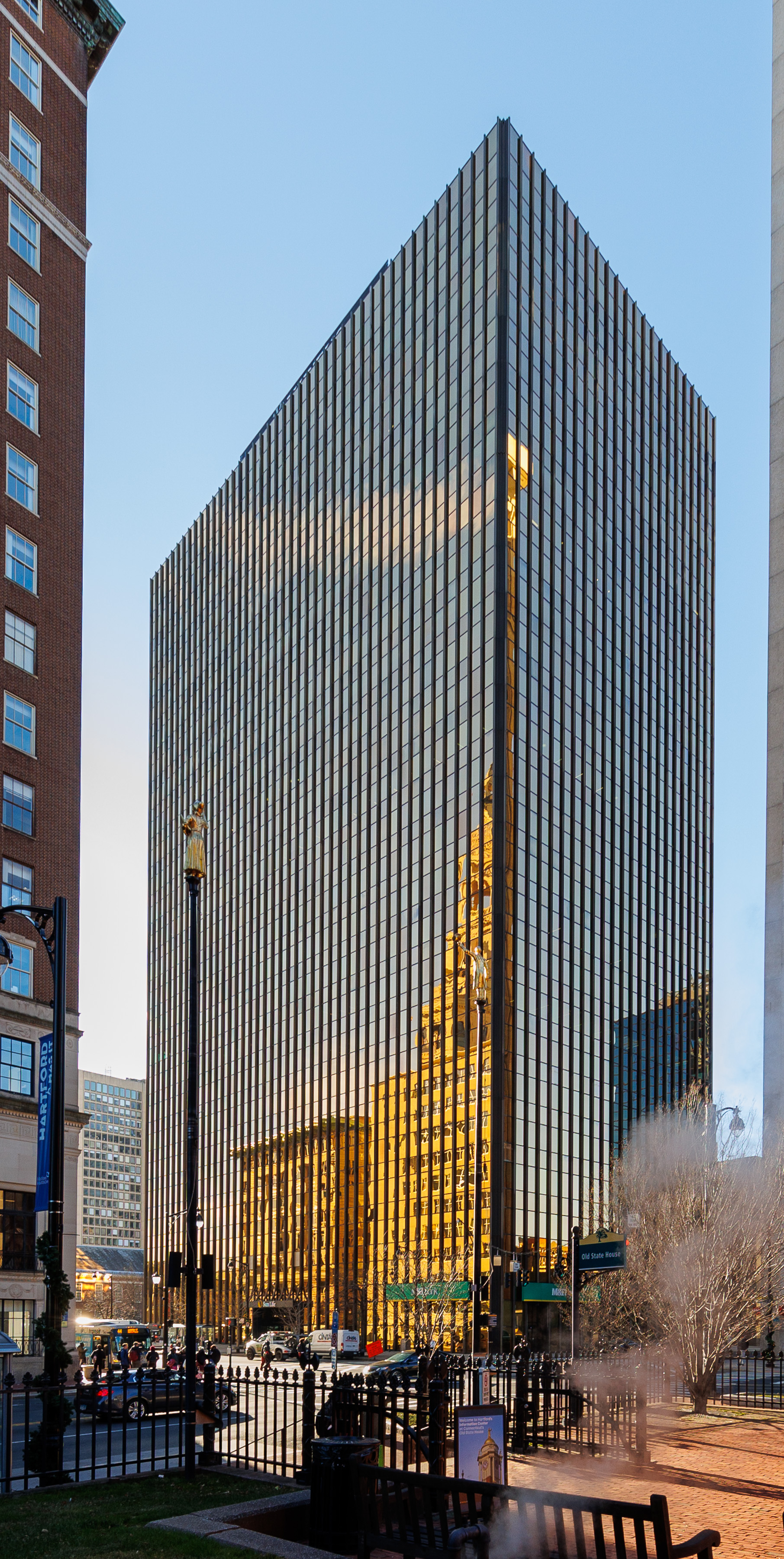
One Financial Plaza viewed from State House Square.
