= One Corporate Center (Hartford, Connecticut) =

High-rise building in Hartford, Connecticut

- As seen from Church St & Main St (2026)

- Location within Connecticut Location within the United States

General information
- Status: Completed
- Architectural style: Modern
- Coordinates: 41°46′08″N 72°40′25″W
- Completed: 1981

Height
- Height: 305 ft (93 m)

Technical details
- Floor count: 23

Design and construction
- Architects: Irwin J. Hirsch & Associates

Website
- www.shelbourneco.com/properties/20-church-st

One Corporate Center (also referred to as the "Stilts Building" and also by its street address "20 Church Street") is a 305 ft (93 m) tall modernist skyscraper in Hartford, Connecticut. It was built in 1981 and it has 23 floors. As of January 2026 it is the 11th tallest building in Hartford and the 18th tallest building in Connecticut. At the time of its completion it was the 5th tallest building in Hartford and the 6th tallest building in Connecticut. Notable tenants include Ernst & Young, Northwestern Mutual, and the US Department of Housing and Urban Development. The building's nickname comes from the angled supports at the base of the building.

In 2014 Shelbourne Global Solutions bought the building for $44.42 million dollars with a $30.75 million dollar mortgage from Cantor Commercial Real Estate Lending, which sold it to Wells Fargo not long after. In 2022 the building went into foreclosure after Wells Fargo filed a lawsuit which claimed that Shelbourne had not paid them since February 6th of that year.

== See also ==
- List of tallest buildings in Hartford
- List of tallest buildings in Connecticut
