= Goodwin Square =

Building in Hartford, Connecticut

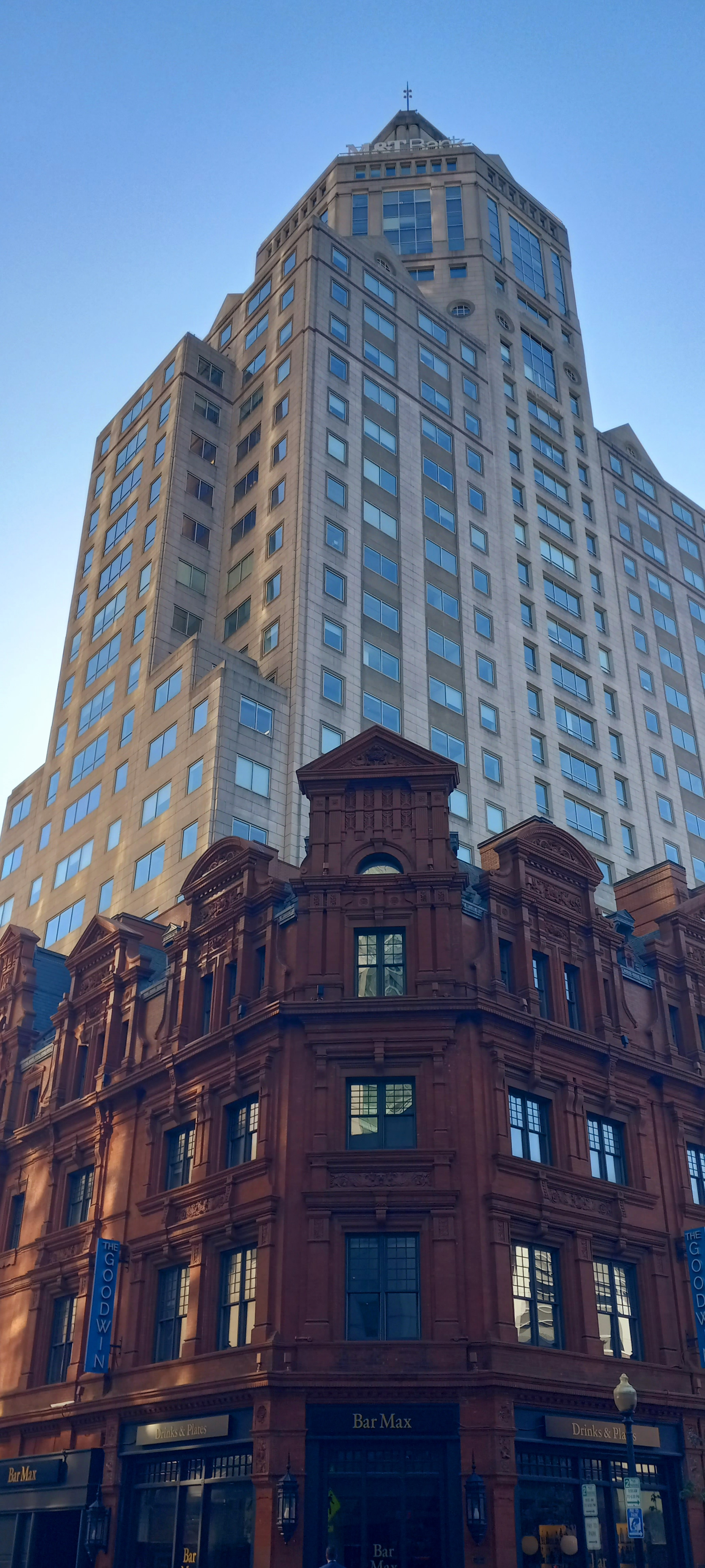
- Goodwin Square

- Location within Connecticut

General information
- Status: Completed
- Type: Office building
- Architectural style: Postmodern
- Location: 225 Asylum Street; Downtown Hartford, Hartford County, Connecticut
- Coordinates: 41°45′58″N 72°40′22″W
- Construction started: 1989
- Completed: 1989
- Cost: $60,300,000
- Owner: Westport Capital Partners

Height
- Roof: 522 ft (159 m)

Technical details
- Floor count: 30
- Floor area: 106,412 ft^{2} (9,886.0 m^{2})

Design and construction
- Architecture firm: Skidmore, Owings & Merrill
- Structural engineer: Skidmore, Owings & Merrill
- Main contractor: Fusco Corporation

Goodwin Square is a 30-story, 522 ft (159 m) skyscraper located at 225 Asylum Street in Downtown Hartford, Connecticut. The Goodwin Square complex includes the office tower that bears its name, as well as the adjoining Goodwin Hotel. The tower itself is the third tallest building in Hartford and in Connecticut.

After foreclosure in 2013, Goodwin Square entered a period of limbo before being bought by a Wilton-based real estate firm in May 2015. Westport Capital Partners, which together with two co-investors bought the building in an online auction for $17.6 million.

== See also ==
- List of tallest buildings in Hartford
- List of tallest buildings by U.S. state
