= City Place I =

Tallest building in Connecticut, US

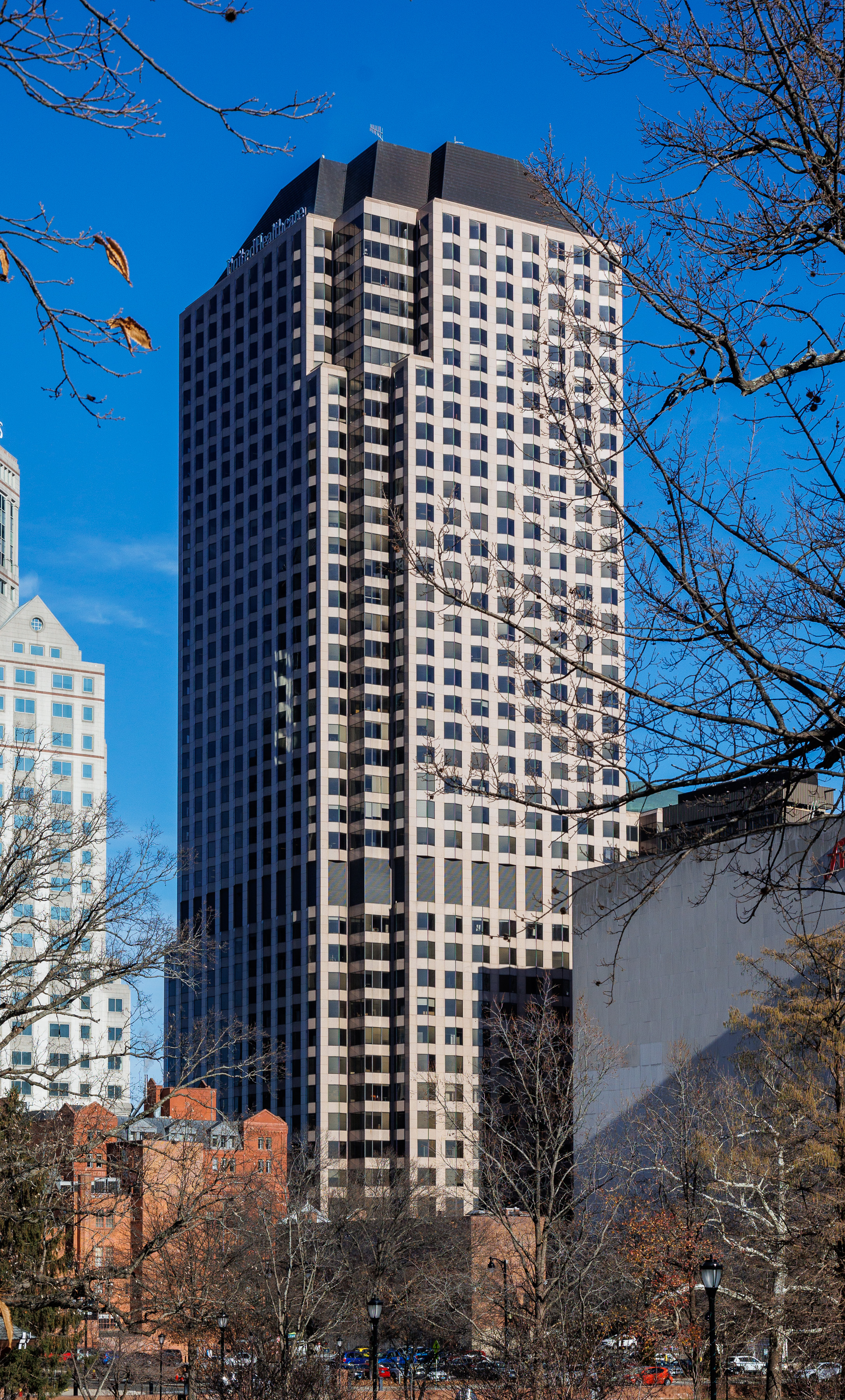
- City Place I viewed from Bushnell Park in 2023.

General information
- Location: 185 Asylum Street, Hartford, Connecticut
- Coordinates: 41.766895°N 72.676615°W
- Completed: 1984
- Owner: Paradigm Properties LLC
- Operator: Paradigm Properties LLC

Height
- Roof: 537 feet (164 m)

Technical details
- Floor count: 38
- Floor area: 76,180 m^{2} (820,000 sq ft)

Design and construction
- Architecture firm: Skidmore, Owings and Merrill
- Structural engineer: Skidmore, Owings and Merrill

Website
- cityplace.buildingengines.com

City Place I is a 38-story, 537-foot (164 m) skyscraper at 185 Asylum Street in Hartford, Connecticut. It is the tallest building in the state, tallest building in New England outside of Boston, and about ten feet taller than Travelers Tower, built in 1919 by W.E. O'Neil Construction (firm based out of Chicago, IL). City Place I was designed by Skidmore, Owings & Merrill, and completed in 1984. The majority of the building is office space, though there are various restaurant and retail establishments found on the lower floors.

The building was sold on April 2, 2012 to CommonWealth REIT, a real estate investment trust based in Newton, Massachusetts, for $99 million, by the original owner, CityPlace LLC. This price is approx. $112 per square foot.

== See also ==
- List of tallest buildings in Hartford
- List of tallest buildings by U.S. state
