= Goodwin Hotel =

Building in Hartford, Connecticut

- Goodwin Block
- U.S. National Register of Historic Places
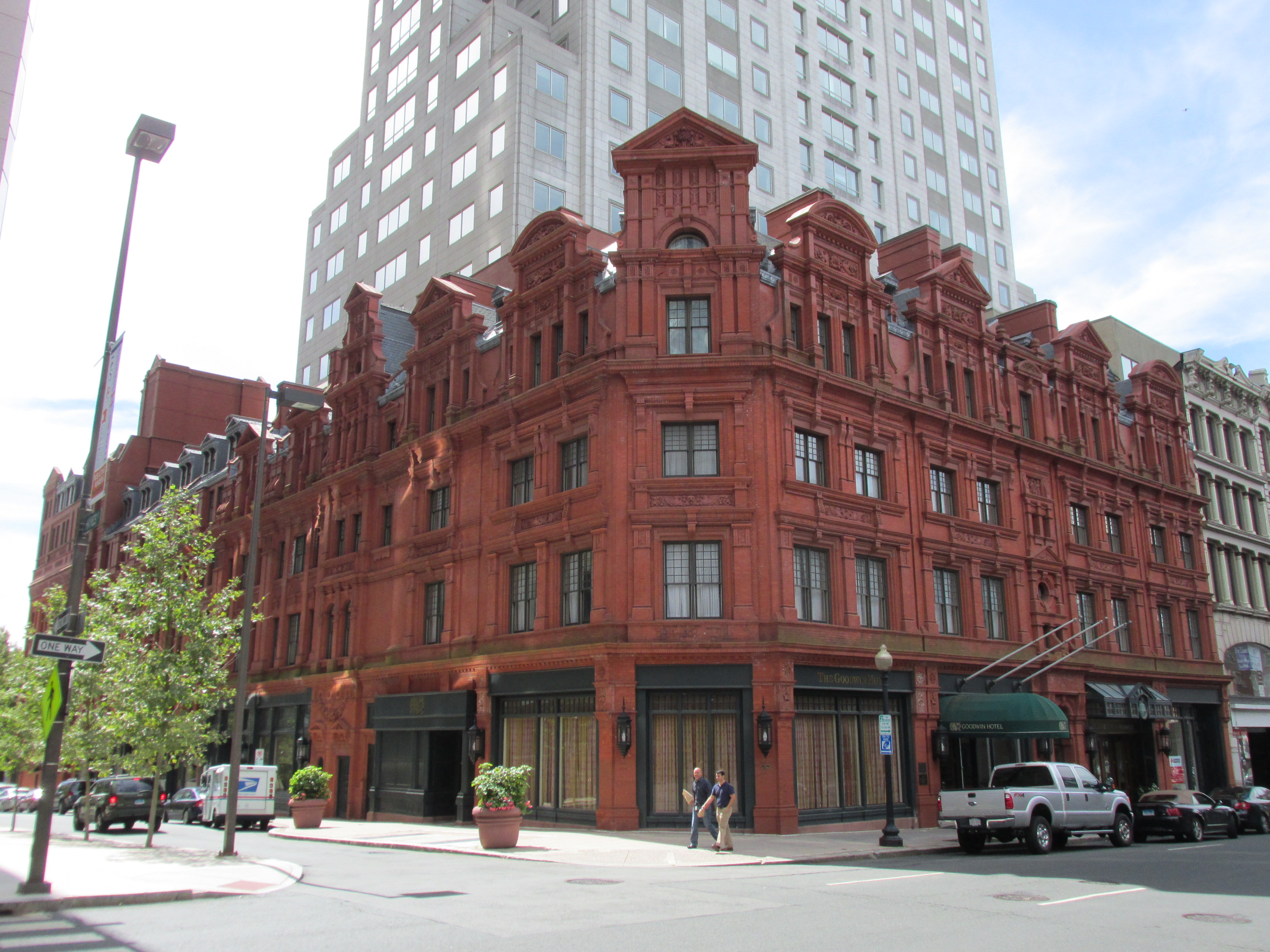
- Goodwin Hotel facade

- Location within Connecticut Location within the United States
- Location: 219–257 Asylum Street, 5–17 Hayes Street, 210–228 Pearl Street, Hartford, Connecticut
- Coordinates: 41°45′58″N 72°40′22″W
- Built: 1881
- Architect: Francis H. Kimball
- Architectural style: Queen Anne, Arts and Crafts style
- NRHP reference No.: 76001990
- Added to NRHP: March 26, 1976

The Goodwin Hotel is a historic hotel and apartment building located in downtown Hartford, Connecticut. Known for its distinctive English Queen Anne terracotta facade, the building was originally developed as an apartment building by brothers James J. Goodwin and Rev. Francis Goodwin and opened in 1881. It was designed by Francis Kimball and was modeled on buildings Rev. Goodwin had seen being constructed at the time in England. Kimball, of the firm of Kimball & Wisedell, was the architect for the Day House in Hartford, which also has an English Queen Anne design. The Goodwin Building was expanded in 1891 to Ann Street and in 1900 to Pearl Street. It was a very prestigious address at the time, with even J.P. Morgan living there during his visits to the city of his birth.

In 1985–1986, the building's Arts and Crafts style interior was gutted to prepare for the structure's incorporation into a new office tower, Goodwin Square, completed in 1989. The facade was preserved, incorporated into the 1980s Goodwin Square office tower built within the original building's footprint. It is the anchor structure within a National Register of Historic Places historic district that includes three adjoining buildings from the same time period. That same year, the Goodwin Hotel opened in the former apartment building.

The hotel operated within the Goodwin Square complex, but closed on December 29, 2008, after losing money for several years. The building's owners hoped to lease it to another operator for as little as $1 a year to keep the historical inn open, but no deal could be reached. The doors initially had to be chained shut, as they had never needed to be locked for the previous 19 years.

After foreclosure in 2013, the Goodwin Square complex entered a period of limbo before being bought by a Wilton real estate firm in May 2015. Westport Capital Partners, which together with two co-investors bought the hotel and adjoining skyscraper in an online auction for $17.6 million. The hotel portion of the complex was sold to a hospitality group based in Stamford, Greenwich Hospitality, which owns and operates numerous hotels in the region, under the brands Hotel Zero Degrees and Delamar Hotels. After a complete renovation, the hotel reopened in June 2017. The flagship restaurant has been renamed Harlan Braserrie and opened at the same time.

== See also ==
- National Register of Historic Places listings in Hartford, Connecticut
