= Buckingham Square District =

Historic district in Connecticut, United States

- U.S. National Register of Historic Places
- U.S. Historic district
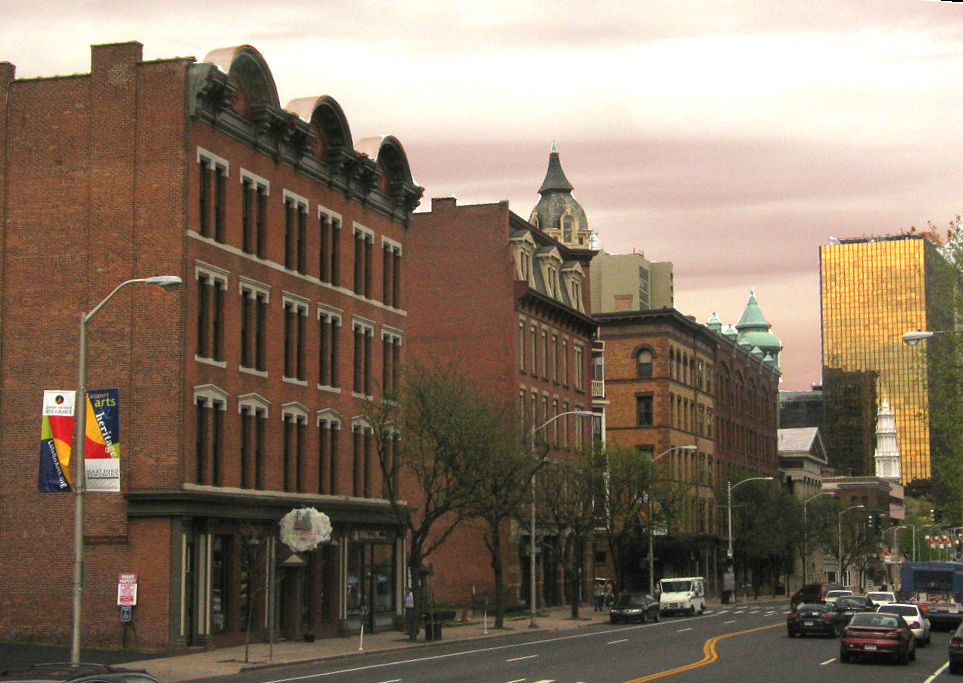
- West Side of Main Street between Buckingham and Linden

- Location within Connecticut Location within the United States
- Location: Main and Buckingham Street, Linden Place, and Capitol Avenue, Hartford, Connecticut
- Coordinates: 41°45′37″N 72°40′35″W
- Area: 8 acres (3.2 ha)
- Built: 1863
- Architectural style: Late Victorian, Italianate, Richardsonian Romanesque
- NRHP reference No.: 77001404 (original); 82000999 (increase)

Significant dates
- Added to NRHP: June 5, 1977
- Boundary increase: November 30, 1982

The Buckingham Square District of Hartford, Connecticut encompasses a mixed residential and commercial neighborhood area just south of the city's downtown. It is centered around Buckingham Square, laid out in 1830 on the site of an early colonial-era church. The district includes a concentration of well-preserved Victorian architecture from the 1860s to 1890s. It was listed on the National Register of Historic Places in 1977, and slightly enlarged in 1982.

== Description and history ==
The Buckingham Square area is part of Hartford's earliest settlement, with Main and Buckingham Streets appearing on maps as early as 1640. That intersection was the site of a church built in 1670 by congregants who split from the city's First Congregational Church. When that church was demolished in the early 19th century, its site became Buckingham Park. The area between the park and Main Street was built out in the second half of the 19th century with mixed commercial-residential construction, while the roads stretching westward remained predominantly residential, with mainly brick and brownstone row houses lining the streets.

The core of the historic district consists of two city blocks, bounded on the east by Main Street, the north by Capitol Avenue, the west by Hudson Street, and the south by Buckingham Street. It extends from this core to include buildings between Capitol Avenue and Linden Place, and a portion of the south side of Buckingham between John and Hudson Streets. The district was extended in 1982 to also include a single building facing Hudson Street just south of Buckingham. The buildings are stylistically diverse, with early buildings in the Italianate style, and later constructions in the Second Empire, Romanesque, and Gothic Revival.

== See also ==
- National Register of Historic Places listings in Hartford, Connecticut
