= Elm Street Historic District (Hartford, Connecticut) =

Historic district in Connecticut, United States

- U.S. National Register of Historic Places
- U.S. Historic district
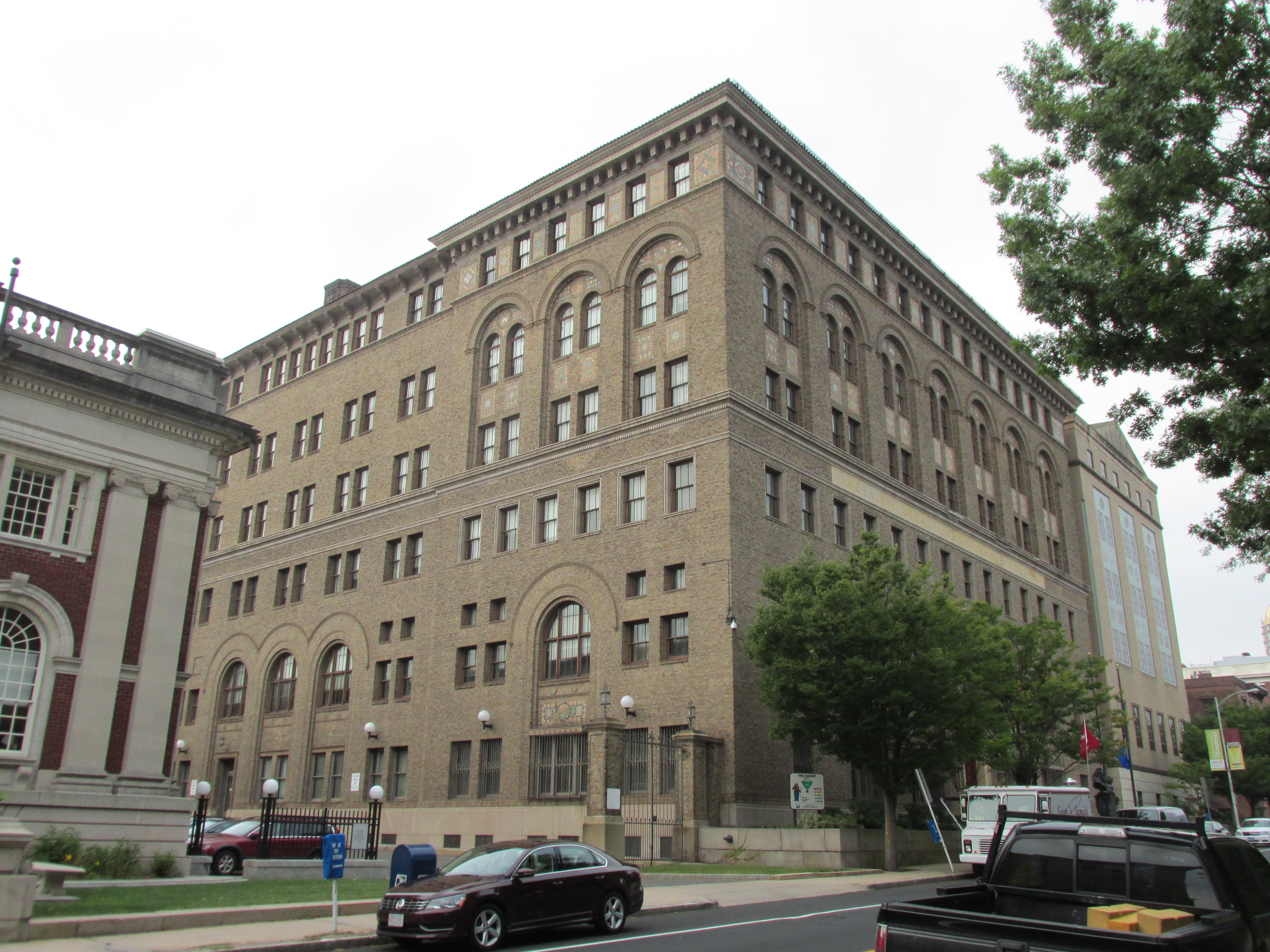
- Phoenix Mutual Life Insurance Company

- Location within Connecticut Location within the United States
- Location: 71-166 Capitol Avenue, 55-97 Elm Street, 20-30 Trinity Street, Hartford, Connecticut
- Coordinates: 41°45′44″N 72°40′48″W
- Area: 15 acres (6.1 ha)
- Architectural style: Colonial Revival, Renaissance, Classical Revival
- NRHP reference No.: 84001003
- Added to NRHP: June 28, 1984

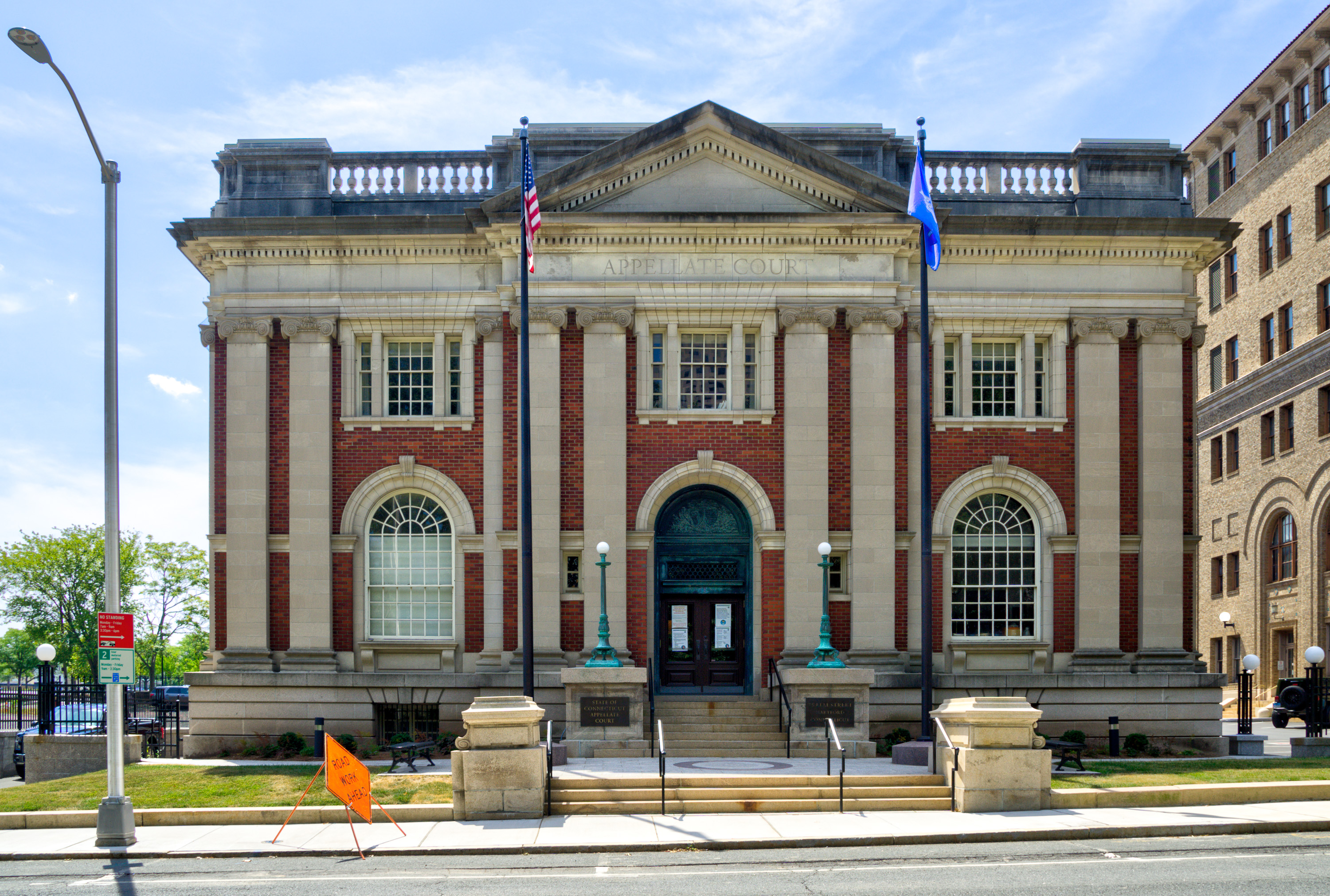
The Appellate Court building at 75 Elm Street is a Contributing Property

The Elm Street Historic District encompasses a collection of architecturally distinguished institutional and residential buildings near the Connecticut State Capitol in Hartford, Connecticut. Located on Capitol Avenue and Trinity and Elm Streets, it includes the city's best concentration of early 20th-century architecture, including Bushnell Memorial Hall and several state office buildings. It was listed on the National Register of Historic Places in 1984.

== Description and history ==
The Elm Street Historic District is located on the southwest of Hartford's downtown. It is bounded on the north by Bushnell Park and the west by the grounds of the state capitol complex. Its buildings extend along Capitol Avenue and the south side of Elm Street between Trinity Street and Pulaski Circle, and along Trinity from Elm to Buckingham Street. It is about 15 acres (6.1 ha) in size, and originally included fourteen historically significant buildings. The largest of these is the State Office Building, between Capitol and Buckingham, a fine example of Classical Revival architecture with Art Deco details, built in 1930 to a design by Corbett, Harrison & MacMurray of New York City. Just to its north is Bushnell Memorial Hall, designed by the same firm and also completed in 1930. It features a Georgian Revival exterior and a rich Art Deco interior. Extending east from the Bushnell area on Capitol Avenue are the First Presbyterian Church (1870, Romanesque Revival), and parking lots, some of which on the site of early 20th-century residential buildings that were part of the district listing but have since been demolished.

North of the Bushnell, at the corner of Trinity and Elm Streets, is the former Orient Insurance Company, now housing the state treasurer's office. It is a fine example of Beaux Arts architecture, built in 1905 to a design by Davis & Brooks of Hartford. Extending east from that building along Elm Street were three large buildings all built by insurance companies between 1917 and 1926, as well as the J.M. Ney building, a former factory. Two of these buildings have been demolished; one, the Scottish Union & National Building, now houses the state appellate court.

== See also ==
- National Register of Historic Places listings in Hartford, Connecticut
