= Travelers Tower =

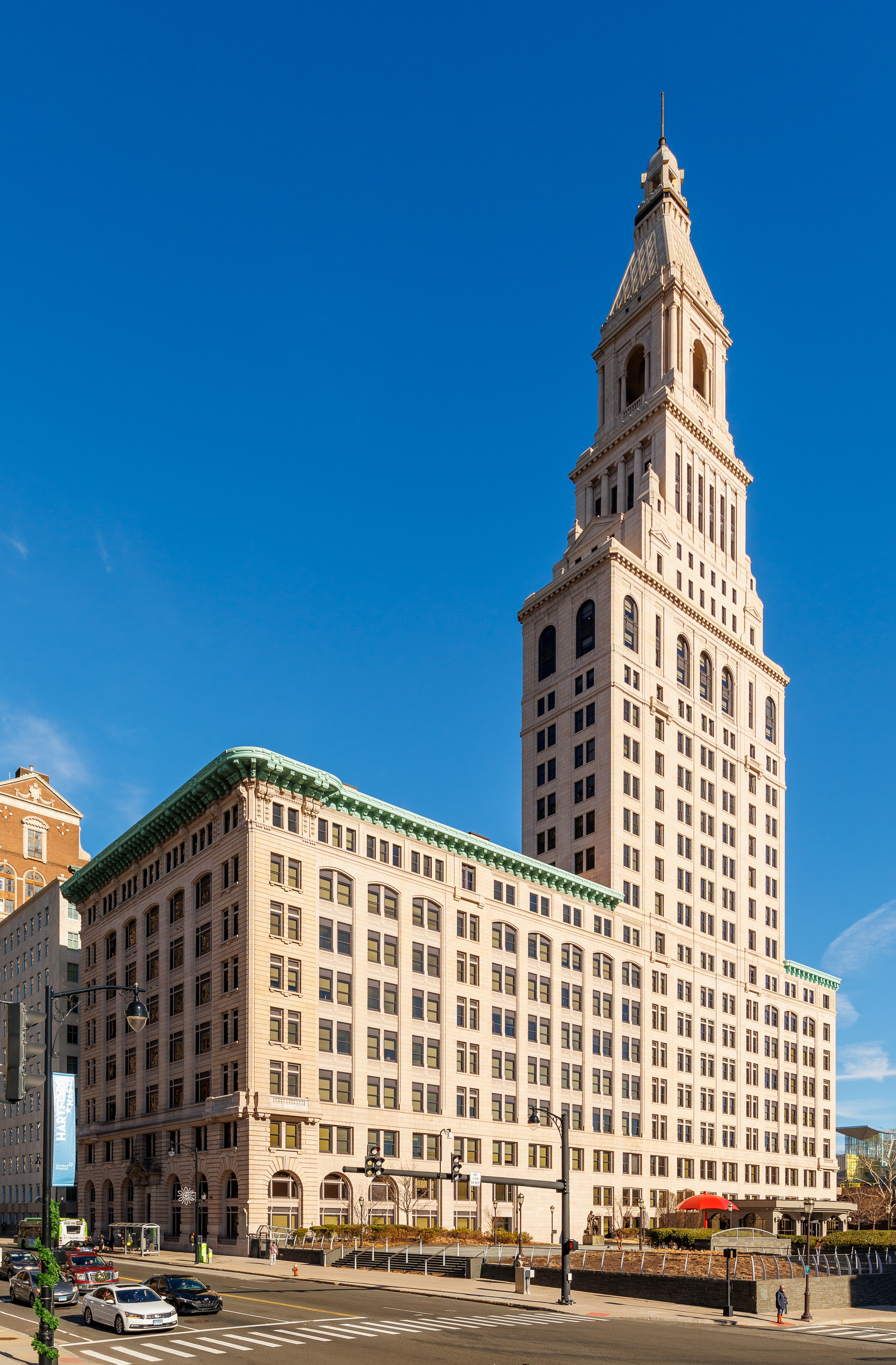
- Former names: One Tower Square; CitiGroup Building

General information
- Status: Completed
- Type: Commercial offices
- Architectural style: Neoclassical - Beaux-Arts
- Location: 1 Tower Square; Hartford, Connecticut
- Coordinates: 41.7638°N 72.6724°W
- Construction started: 1906
- Completed: 1919; 107 years ago
- Cost: $8 million
- Owner: REIT Management Corporation
- Operator: REIT Management Corporation

Height
- Height: 527 ft (161 m)

Technical details
- Floor count: 34
- Lifts/elevators: 6

Design and construction
- Architect: Donn Barber
- Engineer: Bryan Lecza

Travelers Tower is a 24-story, 527-foot (161 m) skyscraper in Downtown Hartford, Connecticut, United States. Travelers Tower was the seventh tallest building in the world when it was constructed in 1919, and is currently the second tallest building in Hartford. Travelers Tower is the fourth headquarters of Travelers Insurance Company. The architect of Travelers Tower was Donn Barber, who also designed the Connecticut State Library, Supreme Court Building and The Hartford Times Building.

It was the tallest building in New England until Boston's Prudential Tower opened in 1964, but remained the tallest building in Connecticut until City Place I opened in 1984.

The tower is actually an extension of two other buildings of which it begins at the tenth floor so it is sometimes considered to have 34 floors. At the 27th floor is an open observation deck. The top of the building has become a nesting spot for peregrine falcons, which are observed by web cameras. Due to maintenance to the tower, the web cameras have been taken offline and the nest box has been relocated to the Travelers Plaza Building. Maintenance has since been finished.
