= 777 Main Street (Hartford, Connecticut) =

- U.S. National Register of Historic Places
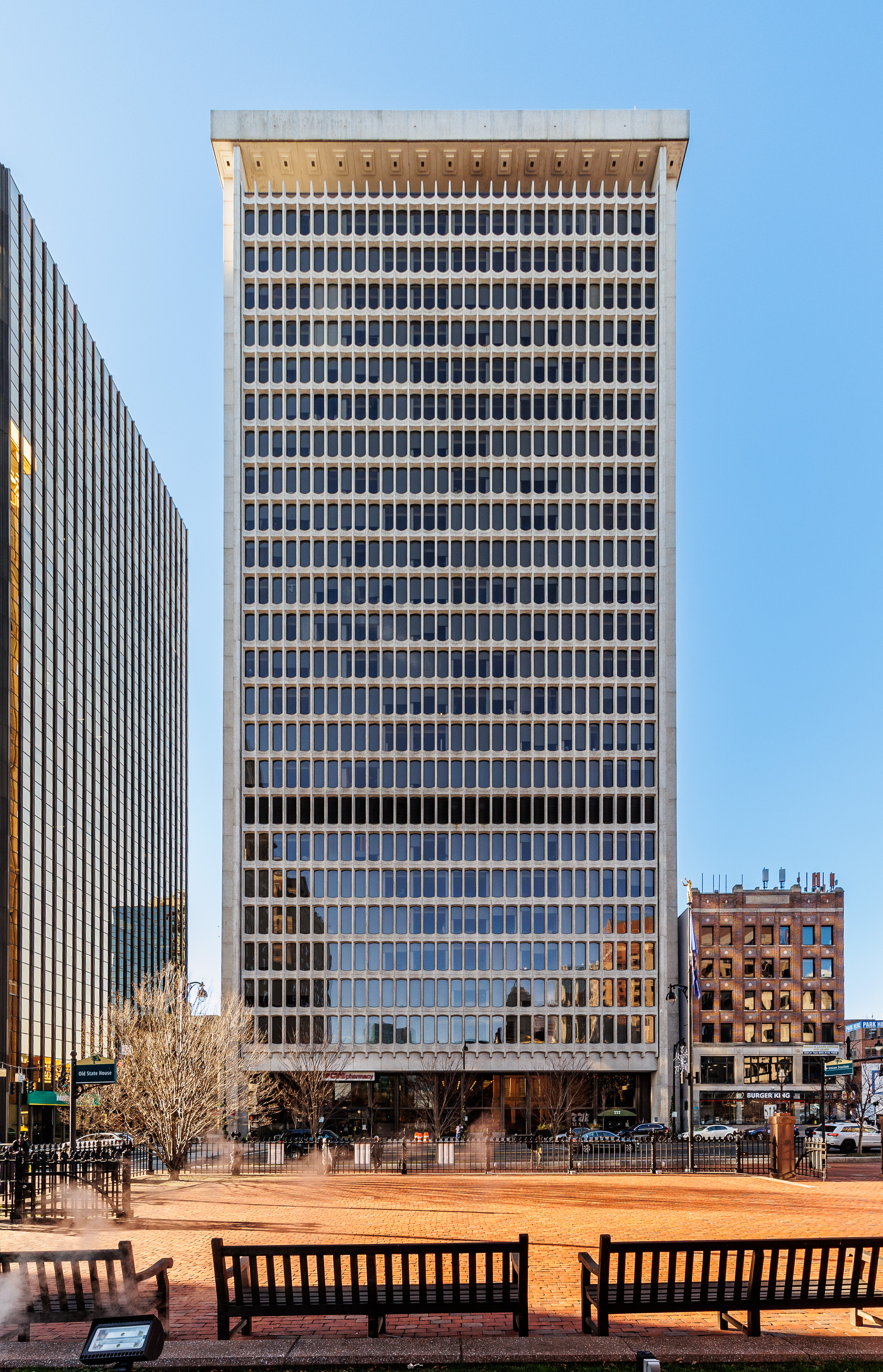

- Location within Connecticut
- Location: 777 Main Street, Hartford, Connecticut
- Coordinates: 41°45′59″N 72°40′25″W
- Area: 1.5 acres (0.61 ha)
- Built: 1967
- Architect: Welton Becket
- Architectural style: Mid-Century Modern
- NRHP reference No.: 14000867
- Added to NRHP: October 14, 2014

777 Main Street (formerly known as the Hartford National Bank and Trust Building) is a residential skyscraper in Downtown Hartford, Connecticut. Built in 1967, it is a prominent local example of Mid-Century Modern architecture, designed by Welton Becket. It was listed on the National Register of Historic Places in 2014, and was converted to residential use. The building is LEED Platinum certified by the U.S. Green Building Council, and is Connecticut's first microgrid. Clean, combustion-free renewable energy to power and heat the building is created on-site from 336 Rooftop Solar panels and a 400 kilowatt fuel cell. These clean energy sources also power the 31 electric charging stations in the building's garage, helping to bolster clean commuting.

== Description ==
777 Main Street occupies a prominent position in the heart of Downtown Hartford, facing the Old State House across Main Street. It occupies most of the city block between Pearl and Asylum Streets. It is 354 feet (108 m) in height, with 26 stories. It is built out of concrete and steel, with its facades dominated by about 2000 precast window modules. The walls are supported at the corners by L-shaped steel beams, with steel girder across the main facade above the second level to support the upper level walls. The main lobby entrance is recessed under this, and consists of glass walls supported by bronzed steel mullions.

== History ==
The Hartford National Bank and Trust Company was one of the state's largest banks when it was convinced by city planners in the 1960s to become part of a major urban renewal project centered around Hartford's Constitution Square, the location of the Old State House. The company committed a $14 million investment to the project, and had this tower built. It was designed by Los Angeles architect Welton Becket. Becket was involved in the city's planning processes, and the builder, George Fuller, was responsible for construction of the nearby Phoenix Life Insurance Company Building, a local Modernist landmark.

Bank of America was the last corporate tenant and moved out in 2012 leaving the building unoccupied. In 2014 the building underwent an 85 million dollar conversion to luxury apartments. The conversion resulted in 285 studio, one- and two-bedroom apartments with twenty percent reserved for low and moderate income households as well as expanded street-front retail space.

== See also ==
- National Register of Historic Places listings in Hartford, Connecticut
