= Knights of Columbus Building =

Knights of Columbus Building or Knights of Columbus Hall may refer to:

- Knights of Columbus Building (Columbus, Ohio), NRHP-listed
- Knights of Columbus Building (New Haven, Connecticut)
- Knights of Columbus Building (Gary, Indiana), NRHP-listed in Lake County
- Knights of Columbus-Indiana Club, South Bend, Indiana, NRHP-listed
- Knights of Columbus Hall (Pascagoula, Mississippi), designated a Mississippi Landmark
- George A. Bartlett House, also known as Old Knights of Columbus Hall, NRHP-listed in Tonopah, Nevada
- Knights of Columbus Building (Portland, Oregon), NRHP-listed in Multnomah County
- 369 Washington Street in Dedham, Massachusetts

== See also ==
- List of Knights of Columbus buildings
