= List of Knights of Columbus buildings =

This is a list of notable buildings of the Knights of Columbus, a Roman Catholic fraternal service organization founded in 1881 in New Haven, Connecticut.

in Canada

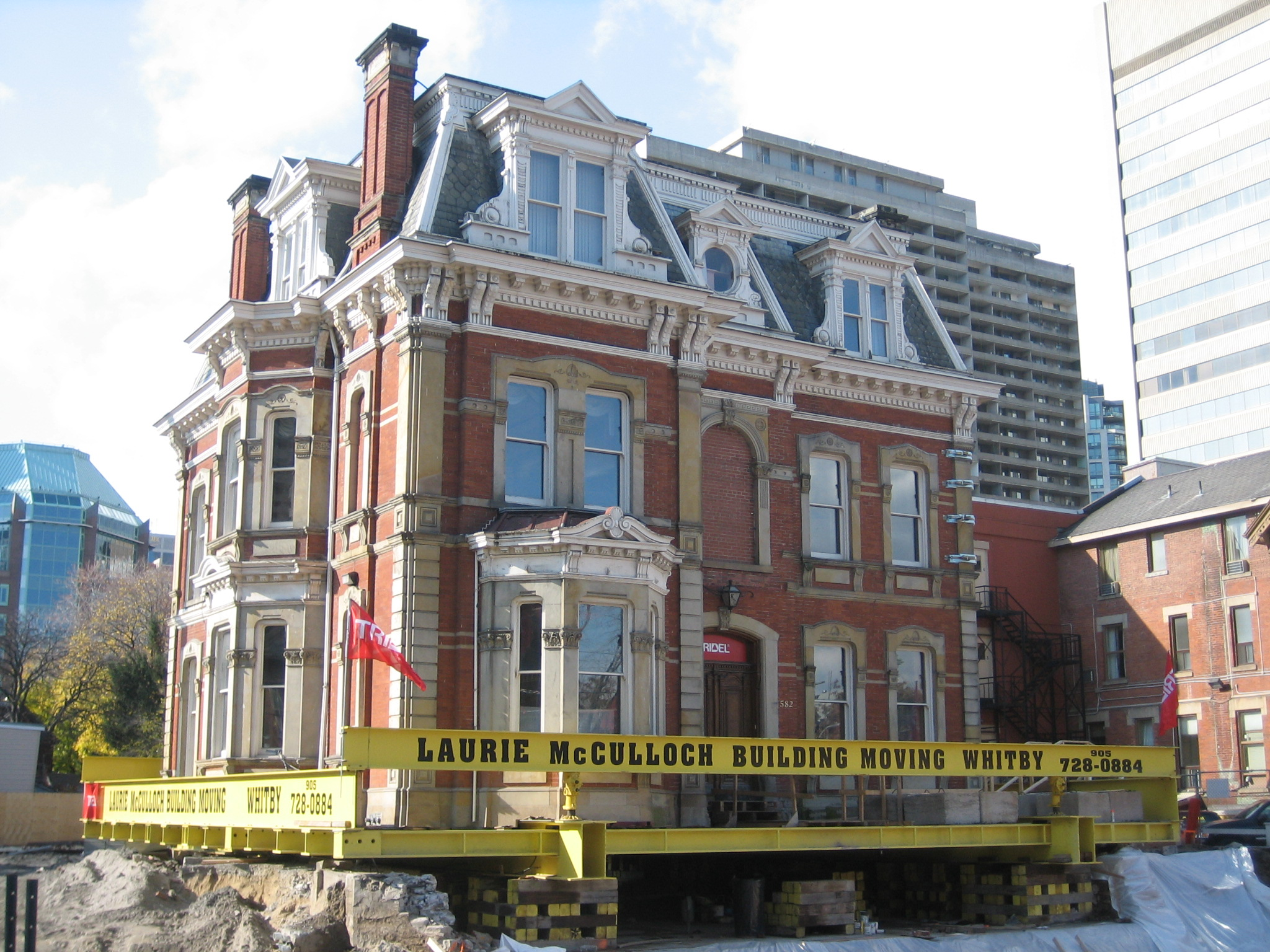
James Cooper House, being moved in Toronto, in 2008

- James Cooper House, Toronto, which served as a Knights of Columbus meetinghall from 1910 to 2005
- A fire at the Knights of Columbus Hall in St John's, Newfoundland kills 99 on December 12, 1942 (see 1942 in Canada).

in the Philippines

- Knights of Columbus Building (Manila)
- Knights of Columbus Building (Cagayan de Oro City)

in the United States

(by state then city or town)

	Building	Image	Dates	Location	City, State	Description
1	Knights of Columbus Building (New Haven, Connecticut)		1969 built	One Columbus Plaza; 41°18′09″N 72°55′39″W	New Haven, Connecticut	Headquarters of the Knights of Columbus. Also known as the Knights of Columbus Tower, the building was designed by Kevin Roche John Dinkeloo and Associates and finished in 1969. It is a 23-story modern style reinforced concrete building, at 321 feet (98 meters) tall, the second-tallest building in the city. The cylindrical towers at the corners give the structure a simple geometric form.
2	Knights of Columbus Building (Gary, Indiana)		1925 built 1984 NRHP-listed	333 W. 5th Ave. 41°36′6″N 87°20′29″W	Gary, Indiana	listed on the National Register of Historic Places in Lake County, Indiana Photos here. And here.
3	Knights of Columbus-Indiana Club		1924 built 1985 NRHP-listed	320 W. Jefferson; 41°40′29″N 86°15′15″W	South Bend, Indiana	Renaissance, Italian Renaissance architecture
4	Knights of Columbus Hall (Pascagoula, Mississippi)		2008 Mississippi listed	3604 Magnolia Street; 30°22′12.06″N 88°33′29.39″W	Pascagoula, Mississippi	Also known as Krebs House; designated a Mississippi Landmark in 2008
5	Knights of Columbus Building (Butte, Montana)		1917 built 1966 cp-NRHP-listed	224 W. Park St; 46°0′44.3″N 112°32′24.86″W	Butte, Montana	Renaissance Revival style; designed by Wellington Smith and built in 1917–1918; regarded as an "icon" in the community; in disrepair in 2009. The Knights of Columbus had by then applied for a $300,000 historic preservation grant from the state. Contributing property in the 1966 Butte-Anaconda Historic District. It is included in a walking tour of historic Uptown area of Butte.
6	George A. Bartlett House, also known as Old Knights of Columbus Hall		1907 built 1982 NRHP-listed	McQuillan and Booker Sts.	Tonopah, Nevada	Shingle Style architecture. Also known as Old Knights of Columbus Hall.
7	Knights of Columbus Building (Portland, Oregon)		1920 built 1990 NRHP-listed; 1998 NRHP delisted	804 SW. Taylor St. 45°31′5.63″N 122°40′53.59″W	Portland, Oregon	Late Gothic Revival architecture demolished around 1998
8	Knights of Columbus Building (Pompano Beach, Florida)		1954-1982 built	6 Columbus Square; 26.29214°N 80.09634°W	Pompano Beach, FL	Mid-Century modern style; front structure designed as early suburban shopping center (by Mackle's General Development Corporation) of 6,000 sq. ft. and built c. 1954; purchased in 1964 by Home Corporation of John A. Hill Council #4955; after expansions in 1968 and 1982 square footage increased to 16,982 sq. ft. Sold in 2000 to Archdiocese of Miami for use as church building. Property (on two acres of land) was sold by archdiocese in 2011 to Wal-Mart, which opened in 2013.
9	369 Washington Street		1897 built, 1920 expanded	Dedham, Massachusetts		

== Additional notes ==
If there is a distinctive architecture for Knights of Columbus halls, it may involve use of the K of C logo (designed in 1883) and components such as fasces, the bundle of sticks with an axe blade, a symbol that generally signifies "strength through unity".

See List of carillons for Knights of Columbus-named tower.
