= Kline Biology Tower =

Skyscraper in New Haven, Connecticut

Kline Tower
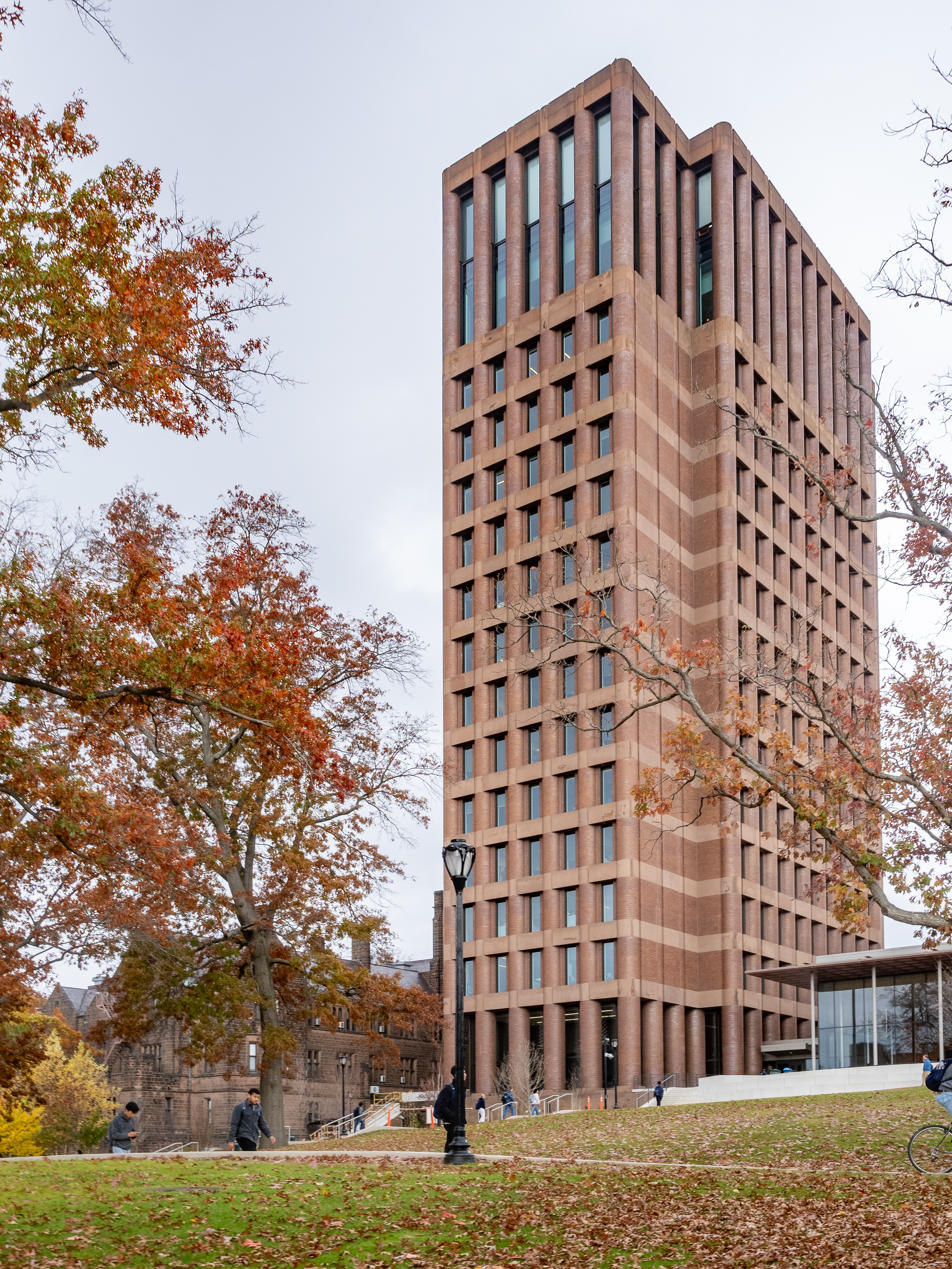
- Kline Biology Tower on Science Hill.
- Interactive map of the Kline Tower area

General information
- Status: Completed
- Type: University
- Location: 219 Prospect Street; New Haven, Connecticut 06511
- Coordinates: 41.3172°N 72.9224°W
- Construction started: 1962
- Estimated completion: 1966
- Cost: $12 million

Height
- Roof: 250 ft (76 m)

Technical details
- Floor count: 16

Design and construction
- Architect: Philip Johnson
- Developer: Yale University

Kline Tower is a skyscraper in New Haven, Connecticut. Formerly Kline Biology Tower, this building is currently the tallest on the Yale University campus and the sixth-tallest building in New Haven. It was the tallest building in the city from 1966 to 1969, and was designed by Philip Johnson, who also designed the nearby—and architecturally related—Kline Geology and Chemistry Laboratories.

The building was previously home to the Yale Department of Biology. On September 22, 2023, the building was rededicated as Kline Tower, with “Biology” no longer in its name. It now houses the Yale departments of Astronomy, Mathematics, and Statistics and Data Science, as well as part of the department of Physics and the Yale Institute for Foundations of Data Science (FDS). The department of Biology, which formerly was in the building and was reflected in its previous name (Kline Biology Tower), is now housed nearby in Yale’s new Science Building.

== See also ==
- List of tallest buildings in Connecticut
- List of tallest buildings in New Haven

Preceded by Southern New England Telephone Company Administration Building	Tallest Building in New Haven; 1966–1969 (76 metres (83 yd))	Succeeded by Knights of Columbus Building
