= Crown Towers (New Haven, Connecticut) =

Skyscraper in New Haven, Connecticut

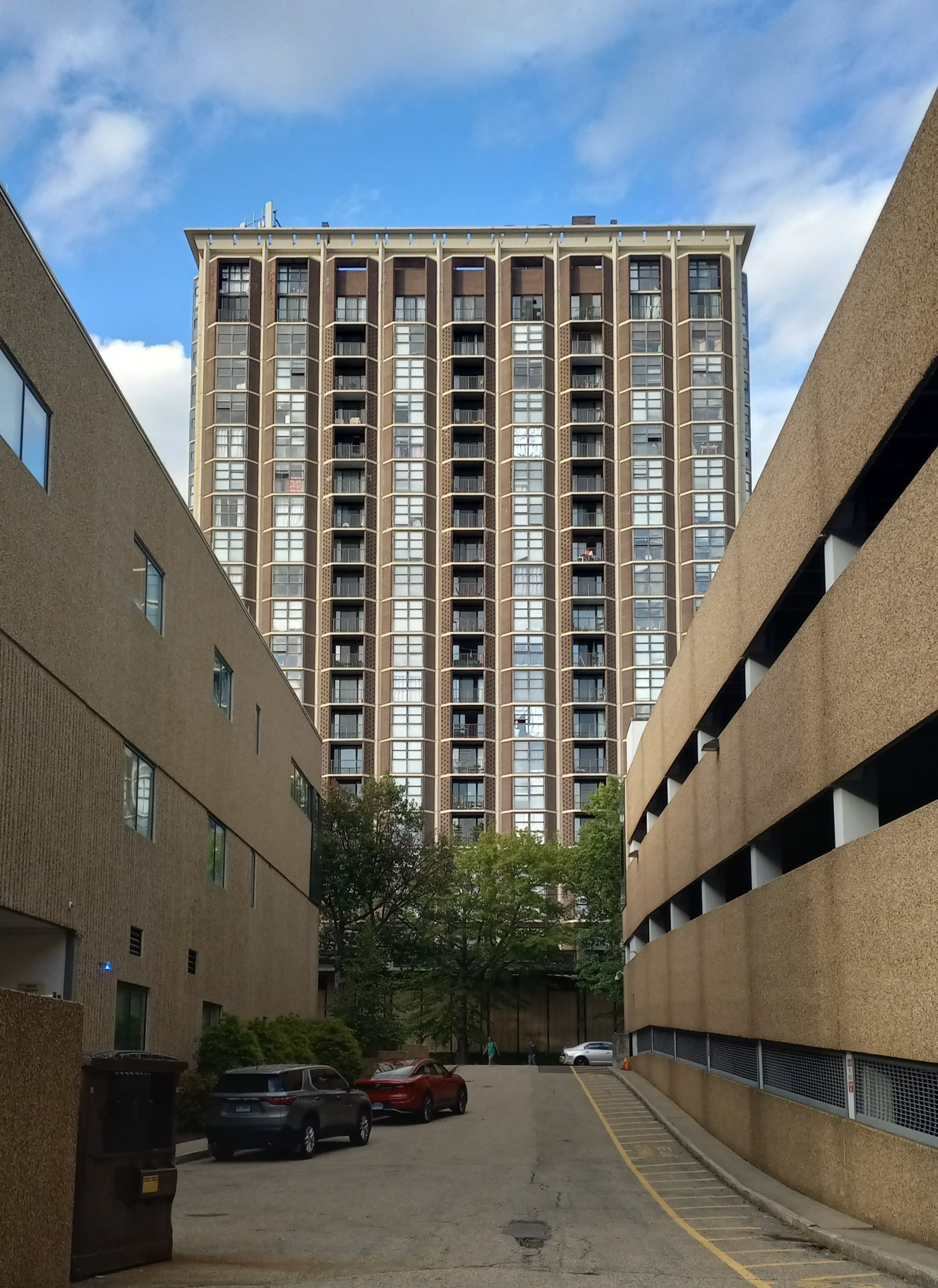
- Crown Towers viewed from Rev Dr M L King Jr Boulevard on September 12th, 2025
- Interactive map of the Crown Towers area

General information
- Type: Office
- Location: 8 High Street; New Haven, Connecticut 06510-2100, United States
- Coordinates: 41°18′24″N 72°55′57″W
- Completed: 1967

Height
- Roof: 222 ft (68 m)

Technical details
- Floor count: 22

Design and construction
- Architects: Chloethiel Woodard Smith & Associates

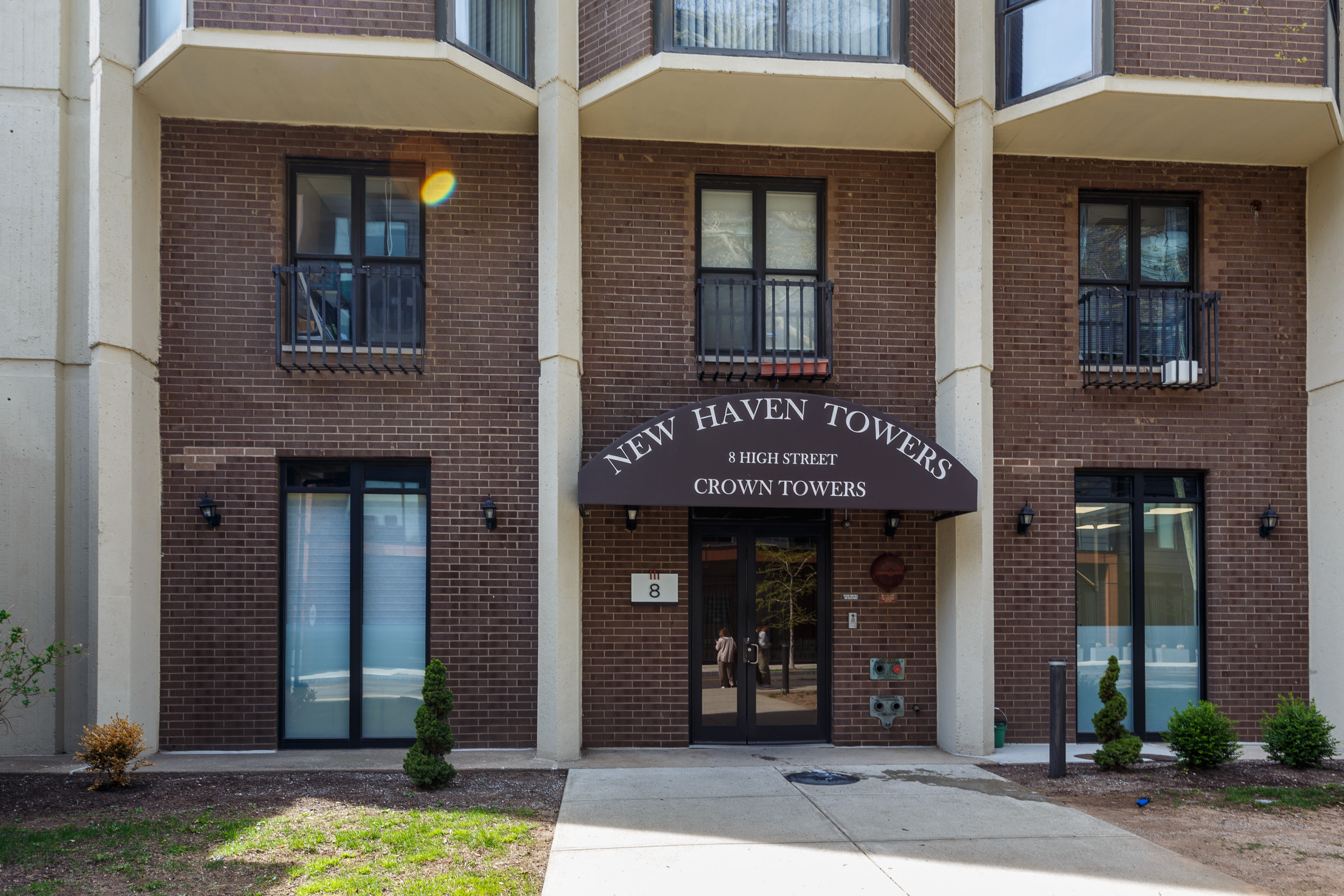
Entrance

Crown Towers is a high-rise apartment building in New Haven, Connecticut part of the New Haven Towers family of buildings. The building stands 222 ft (68 m) tall and is the eleventh-tallest building in the city, the modernist building was New Haven's tallest residential building until the construction of several new developments in Downtown New Haven.
