= Douglas Orr =

American architect

Douglas William Orr
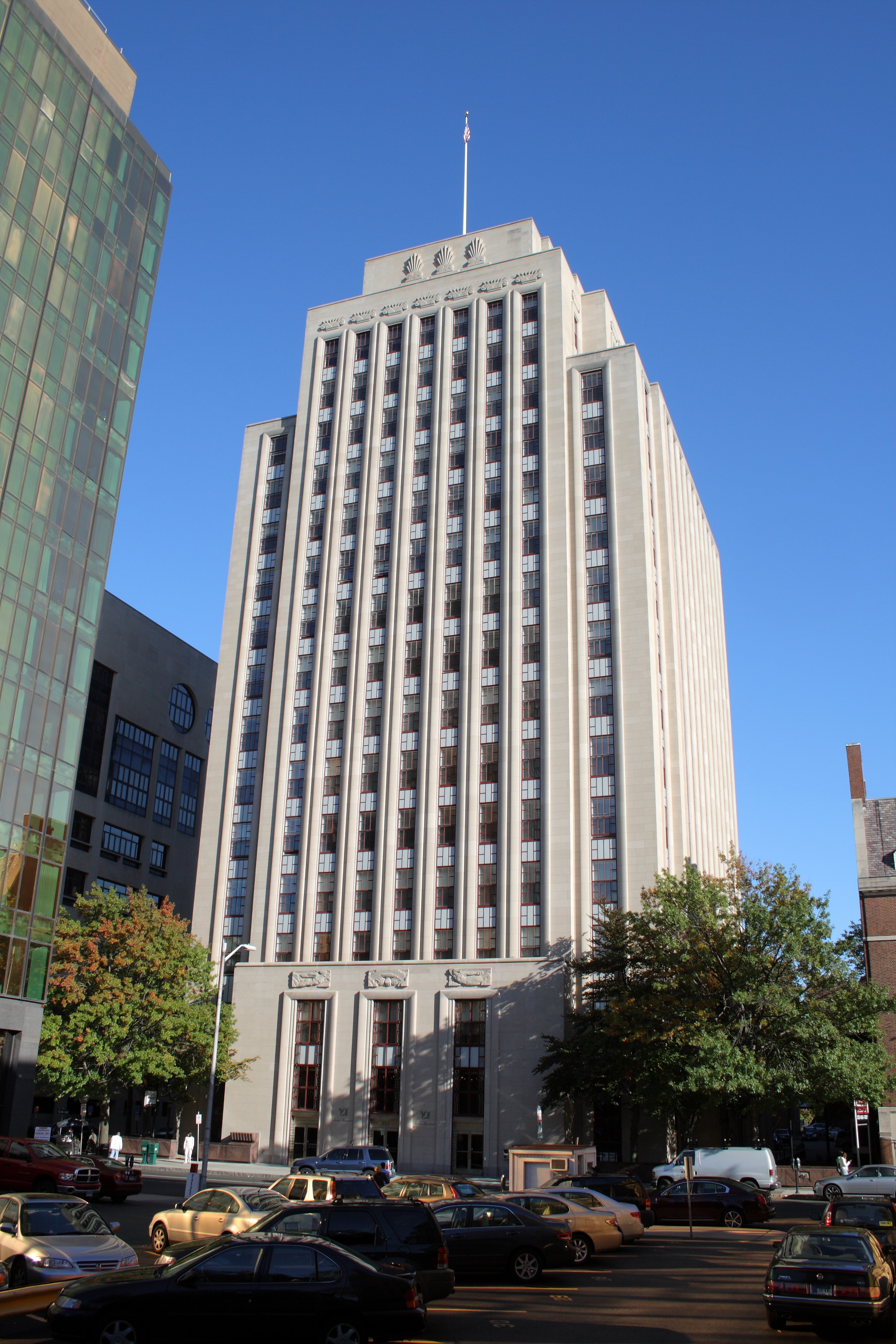
- The Eli (Southern New England Telephone Building)
- Born: March 25, 1892; Meriden, Connecticut
- Died: July 29, 1966 (aged 74); Stony Creek, Connecticut
- Occupation: Architect
- Practice: Douglas Orr, deCossy, Winder and Associates
- Buildings: The Eli (Southern New England Telephone Company); Robert A. Taft Memorial and Carillon; New Haven Lawn Club

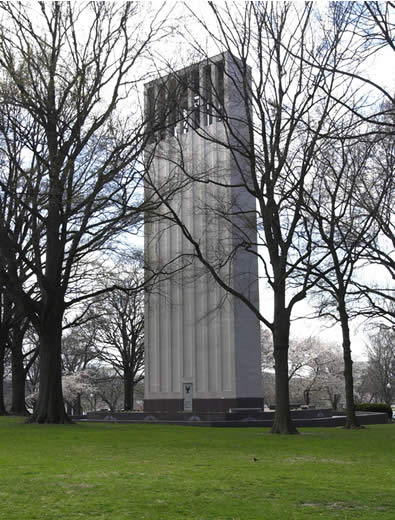
Robert A. Taft Memorial, Washington, D.C.

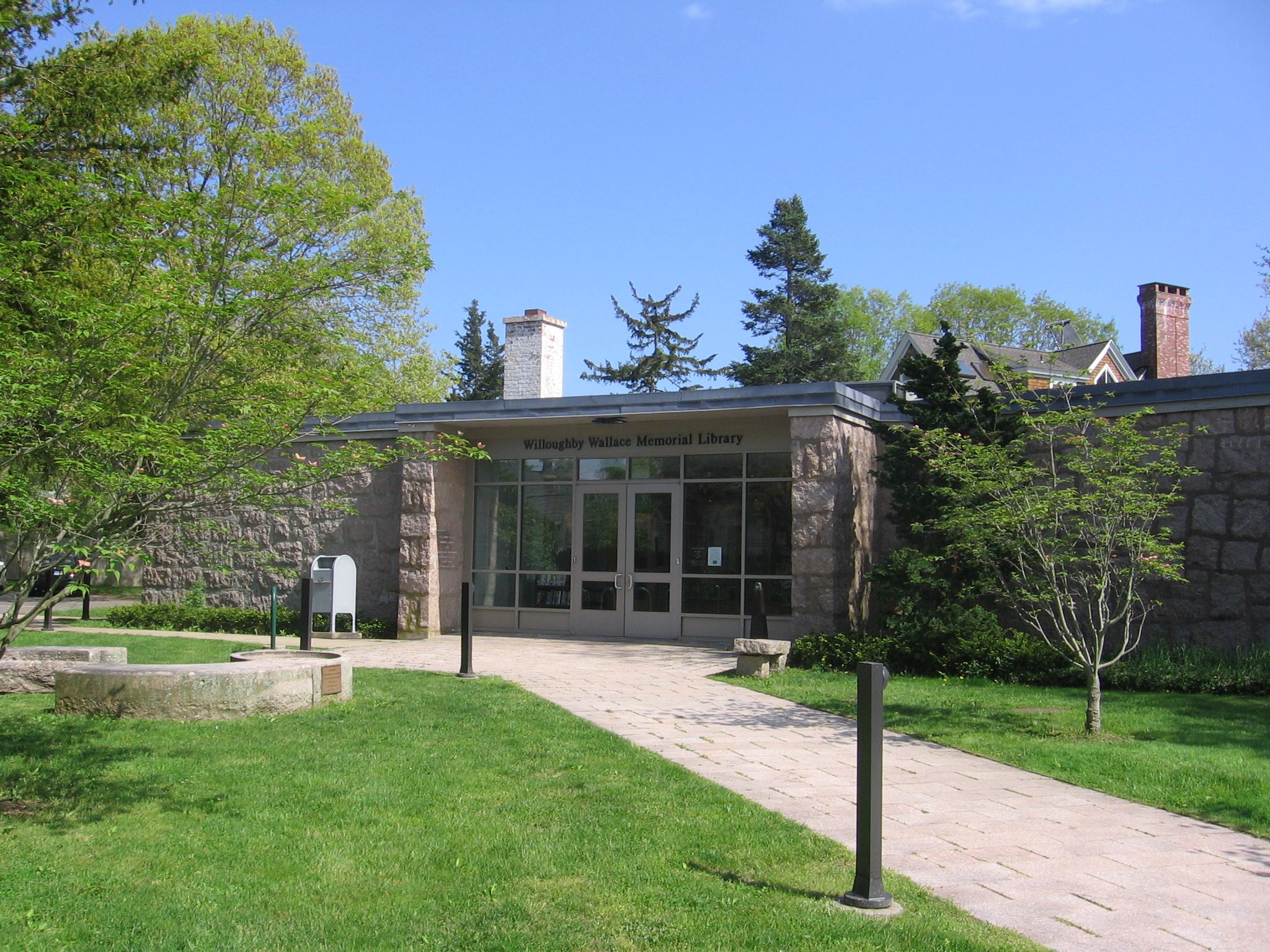
The Willoughby Wallace Memorial Library

Douglas William Orr (March 25, 1892 – July 29, 1966) was an American architect based in New Haven, Connecticut.

== Biography ==
Douglas Orr was born in Meriden, Connecticut, to Adam and Mary Orr. He was prolific and designed many public and commercial buildings, primarily in the New Haven area. He was president of the American Institute of Architects from 1947 to 1949. In 1949, he also helped to renovate the White House. He died in 1966 in Stony Creek, Connecticut.

Orr worked for H. Wales Lines Company before starting the firm Orr & Booth in 1916, partnering with Robert H. S. Booth. The firm received many commissions, including the office and factory of the Connecticut Telephone and Electric Company, but business was interrupted when both partners served in the armed forces on entry of the United States into World War I; Orr served in the army. After receiving his undergraduate degree from Yale University, he opened his own architectural practice in 1919. He completed a master's degree in fine arts at Yale in 1927, where he designed the Taft Memorial Tower and Harkness Memorial Hall. His portfolio included many other academic projects, among them buildings at Mt. Holyoke and Hollins Colleges and memorial chapels at the Coast Guard and Merchant Marine Academies. He was a member of the U.S. Commission of Fine Arts from 1955 to 1963 (vice chairman 1955-1963), a member of the Commission on the Renovation of the Executive Mansion, the Advisory Commission on Presidential Office Space, and the Smithsonian Art Commission. Orr was also an academician of the American Architectural Foundation, a fellow of the American Institute of Architects, and a member of the National Academy of Design.

Late in his career, Orr established a partnership with architects William deCossy and Frank Winder; the firm was then called Douglas Orr, deCossy, Winder, and Associates. Orr worked in Art Deco and Colonial Revival as well as more modern styles.

== Selected works ==
- World War I memorial flagpole, New Haven Green, 1928
- The Eli (Southern New England Telephone), with R. W. Foote, 1937. Art deco masterpiece on the National Register. Company headquarters converted to apartments.
- New Haven Lawn Club
- The Farnam Guest House, 616 Prospect Street, New Haven, CT, 1934. Georgian revival built for Henry W. Farnam.
- The Church of the Redeemer, New Haven, Connecticut, 1951.
- Laboratory for Surgery, Obstetrics and Gynecology, Yale School of Medicine, 1952
- East Pavilion (Memorial Unit), Yale-New Haven Hospital, 1953
- Columbia Gas Transmission Building, Charleston, West Virginia, 1955
- J. W. Gibbs Labs, Yale University, with Paul Schweikher, 1955. Glass, steel and Tennessee marble.
- Willoughby Wallace Memorial Library, Stony Creek, Connecticut, 1958. Faced with Stony Creek granite.
- Robert A. Taft Memorial and Carillon, Washington, DC, 1959
- One Church Street (First New Haven National Bank, now New Alliance Bank), New Haven, 1961. Interior lobbies faced with Stony Creek granite.
- Laboratory of Epidemiology and Public Health (with Philip C. Johnson), Yale University, 1964
- Lippard Laboratory of Clinical Investigation, Yale-New Haven Hospital, 1965
- Community Services Building (now the Knights of Columbus Museum), New Haven, 1965.
