= Union and New Haven Trust Building =

Skyscraper in New Haven, Connecticut

The Union
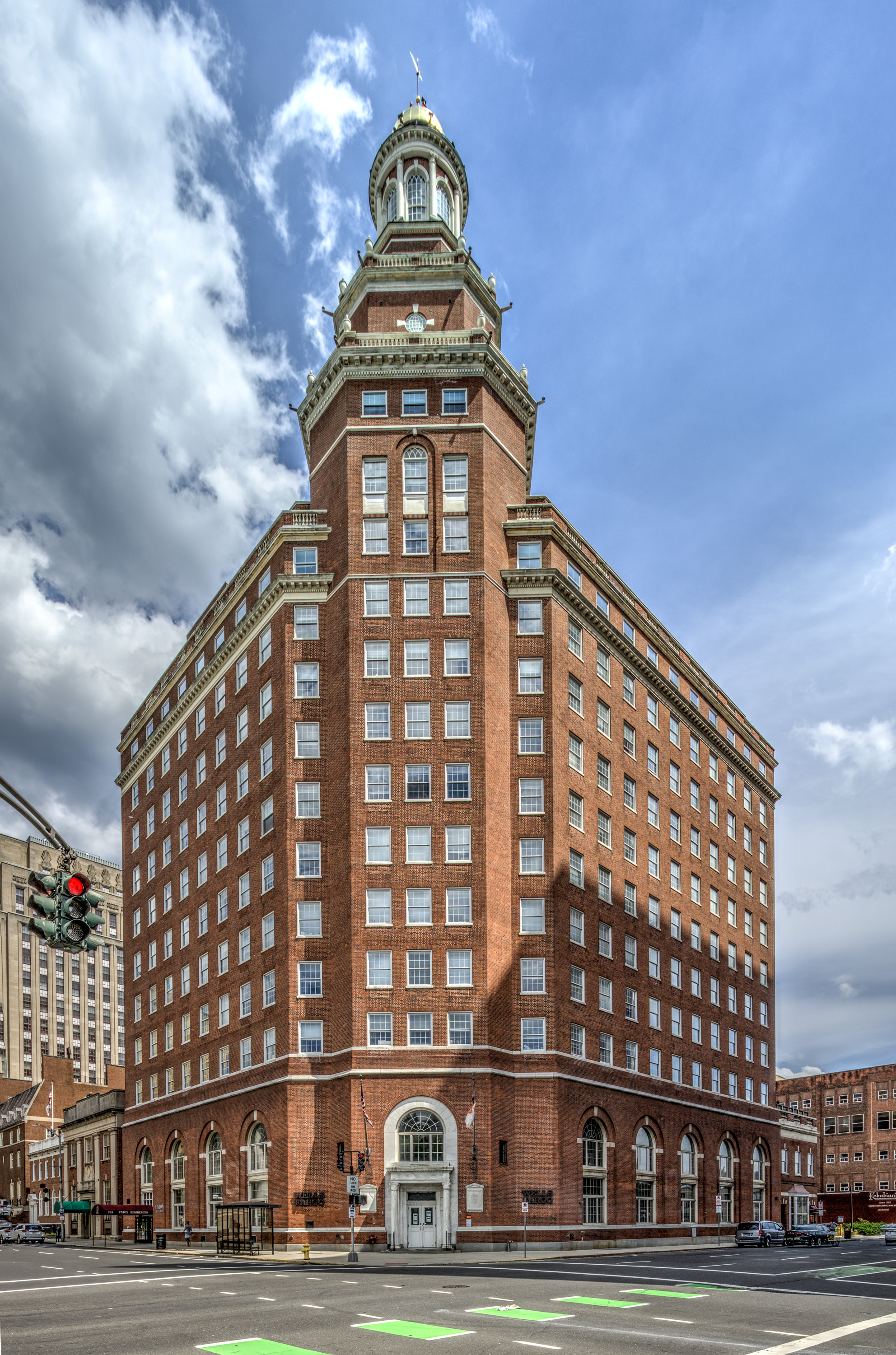
- The red-brick Union and New Haven Trust Building as seen from the New Haven Green.
- Interactive map of the The Union area

Record height
- Tallest in New Haven from 1927 to 1938^{[I]}

General information
- Type: Office
- Location: 205 Church Street; New Haven, Connecticut 06510-2100; United States
- Coordinates: 41.3085°N 72.9238°W
- Completed: 1927

Height
- Tip: 242 ft (74 m)

Technical details
- Floor count: 13
- Floor area: 184,480 square feet (17,139 m^{2})

The former Union and New Haven Trust Building, located at 205 Church Street in New Haven, Connecticut, United States, was the tallest building in New Haven when it was constructed in 1927. This Georgian-Colonial Revival skyscraper was designed by architects Cross and Cross. The building, sited on the northeast corner of the historic New Haven Green, changed hands several times over the years. In 2014 it was converted into residences and renamed The Union.

== History ==
Situated on the corner of Elm and Church streets, the site was the home of Richard Perry in the 1640s, who served as secretary to the General Court of the Colony of New Haven.

The building was constructed for the Union and New Haven Trust Co. during the Roaring Twenties, designed to reflect the architecture of the Green and its three historic churches. The building's golden cupola intentionally mirrors that of the Green's United Church. The building was the tallest in New Haven when it opened in 1927.

The Union Trust Company moved its headquarters to Stamford in 1981, but kept a branch on the ground floor. The bank was purchased in 1995 by First Union Corporation, which later took the name of its Wachovia acquisition and in 2010 merged into Wells Fargo. The building's ground floor is still occupied by a Wells Fargo branch.

== Apartments ==
On March 28, 2013, Cooper Church LLC, a New York-based developer, purchased the 184,480 square-foot building from Hampshire Hotels & Resorts for $13.5 million. The New Haven Board of Zoning Appeals (BZA) approved Cooper Church’s proposed zoning variances in June 2013. Construction to convert the former office building to 138 studio, one-bedroom, and two-bedroom market rate rental apartments began in April 2014.

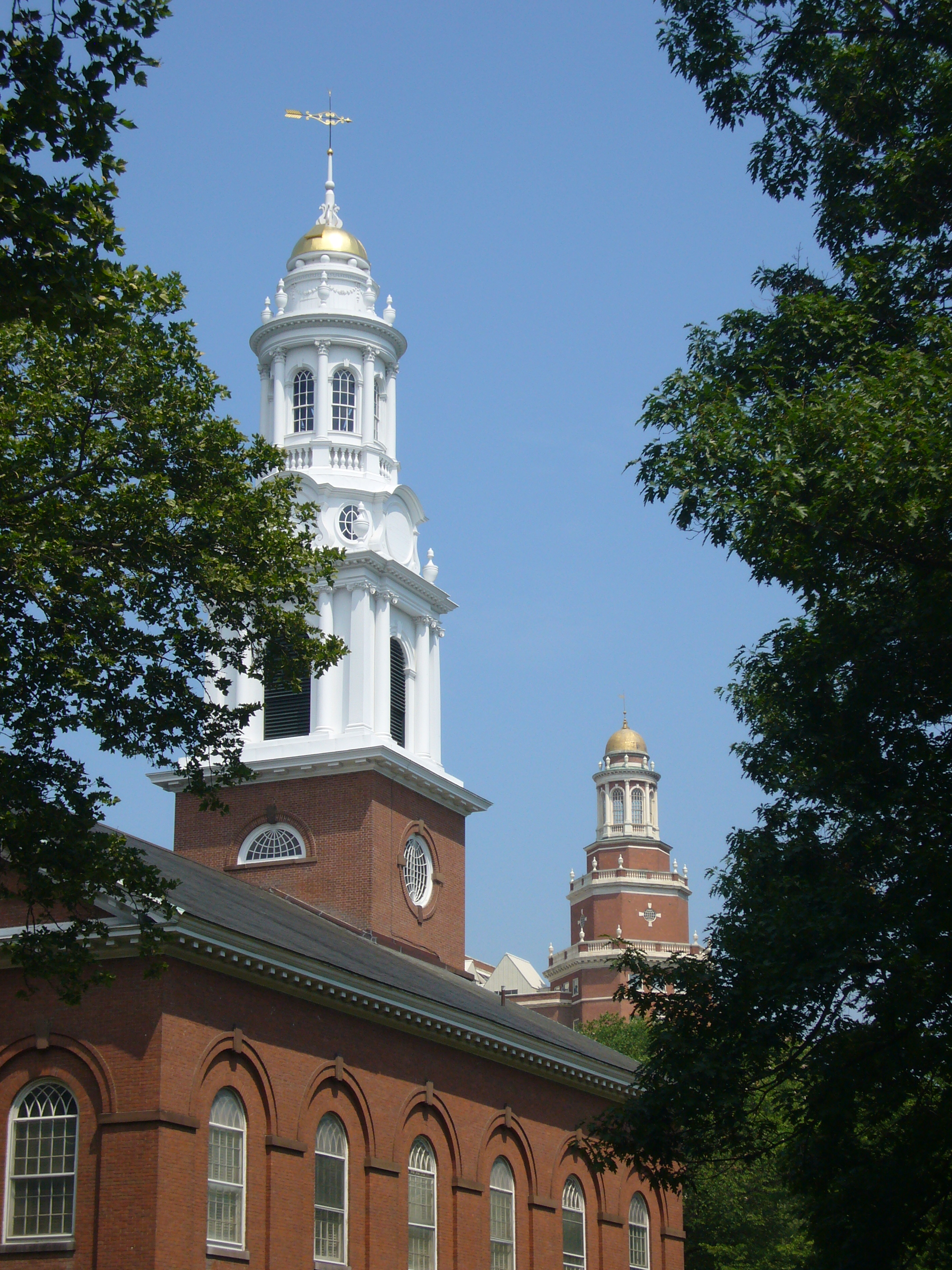
United Church with Union and New Haven Trust Building in background; The Union building's cupola is a tribute to the Church's golden dome.

Leasing at The Union commenced in spring 2015. The building includes 138 studio, one-bedroom, and two-bedroom apartments.

Preceded by Unknown	Tallest Building in New Haven; 1927—1938; 50 m	Succeeded by Southern New England Telephone Company Administration Building
