= 360 State Street =

Skyscraper in New Haven, Connecticut

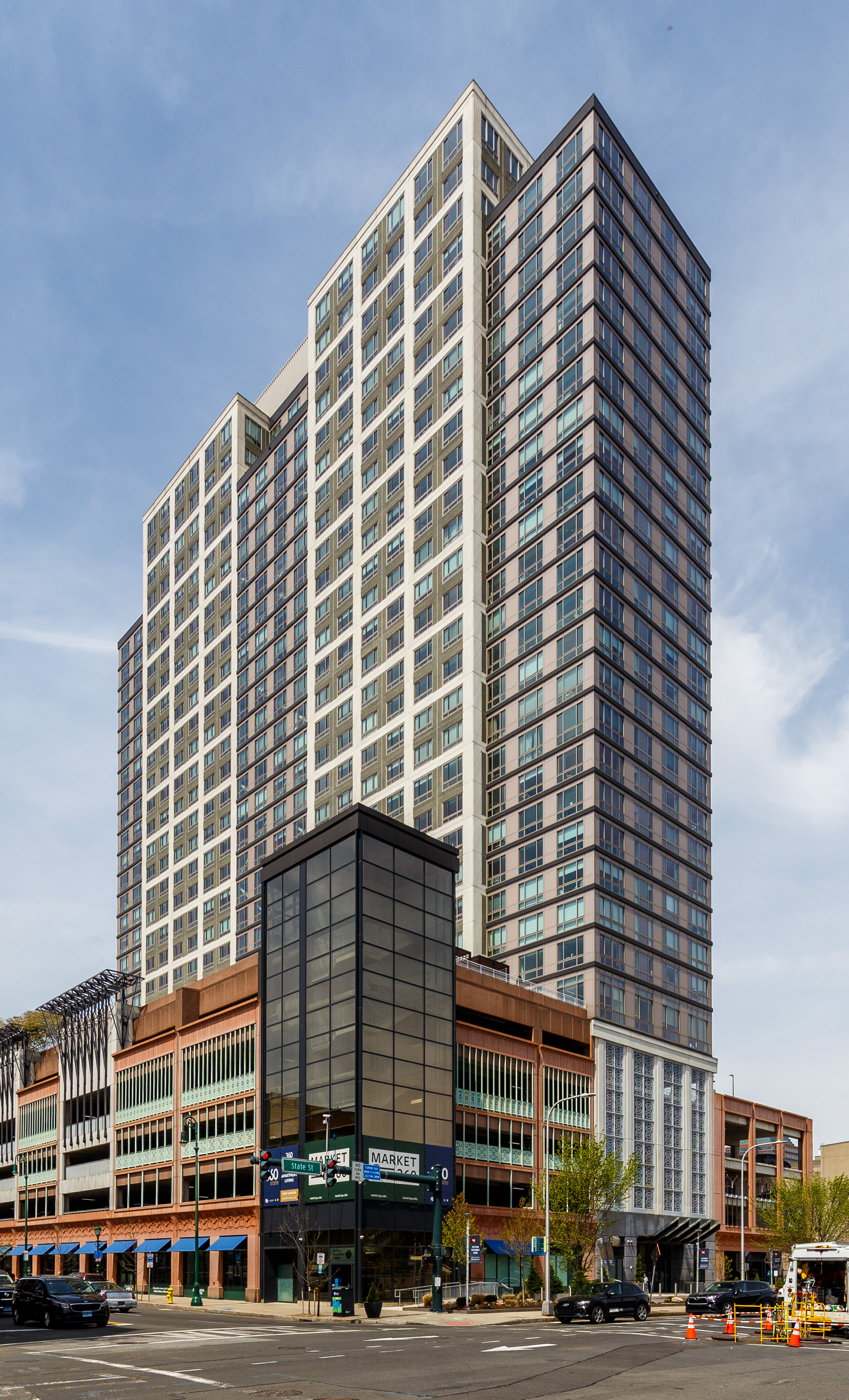
- Interactive map of the 360 State Street area
- Former names: Shartenberg Site Tower I

General information
- Status: Completed
- Type: Rental apartments
- Location: 360 State Street; New Haven, Connecticut
- Coordinates: 41.3047°N 72.9230°W
- Construction started: December 1, 2008
- Topped-out: December 11, 2009
- Completed: 2010
- Cost: US$180 million

Height
- Roof: 103 m (338 ft)

Technical details
- Floor count: 31
- Floor area: 700,000 sq ft (65,000 m^{2})

Design and construction
- Architects: Becker + Becker Associates; Schuman, Lichtenstein, Claman & Efron
- Developer: Becker + Becker Associates
- Structural engineer: DeSimone Consulting Engineers
- Main contractor: Suffolk Construction Co.

360 State Street is a 338-foot (103 m) residential skyscraper completed in 2010 in New Haven, Connecticut. It is the second-tallest building in the city, and the largest apartment building in the state. DeSimone Consulting Engineers were the structural engineers on the building and it won the 2009 New York Construction – Top Project of the Year.

== Description ==
The mixed-use modernist building, includes 500 luxury apartments and 25,000 sq ft (2,300 m^{2}) of retail space. Designated a "green" building by the US Green Building Council (USGBC), it is the first residential building in Connecticut to gain Leadership in Energy and Environmental Design (LEED) Platinum status and includes a rooftop garden and a pool as well as a corner "pocket park" that may be developed as a day care center in the future. A full-scale food co-op occupies the building's ground floor. 360 State was constructed on the site where Shartenberg's Department Store stood from 1915 to 1962. The building allows pets except for the common areas of the 6th floor.

== Environmentally friendly features ==
- 360 State Street was Connecticut's first residence targeting LEED Platinum Certification
- 1/2 the carbon footprint and utility bill of a conventional apartment
- 400 kW fuel cell on site produces renewable power
- Elevators recapture their own energy
- Electric-car charging stations
- Zipcars available
- Bicycle storage
- Built with recycled and local construction materials
- Recycling rooms on each floor
- Half-acre green roof with rainwater harvesting and irrigation system
- High-efficiency lighting and occupancy sensors
- Demand-control ventilation
- Exhaust-heat energy recovery
- Location next to State Street train station provides direct access to New York. Nearby Union Station provides travel to Boston, Hartford and Washington, DC

== See also ==
- List of tallest buildings in New Haven
