= Connecticut Financial Center =

Skyscraper in New Haven, Connecticut

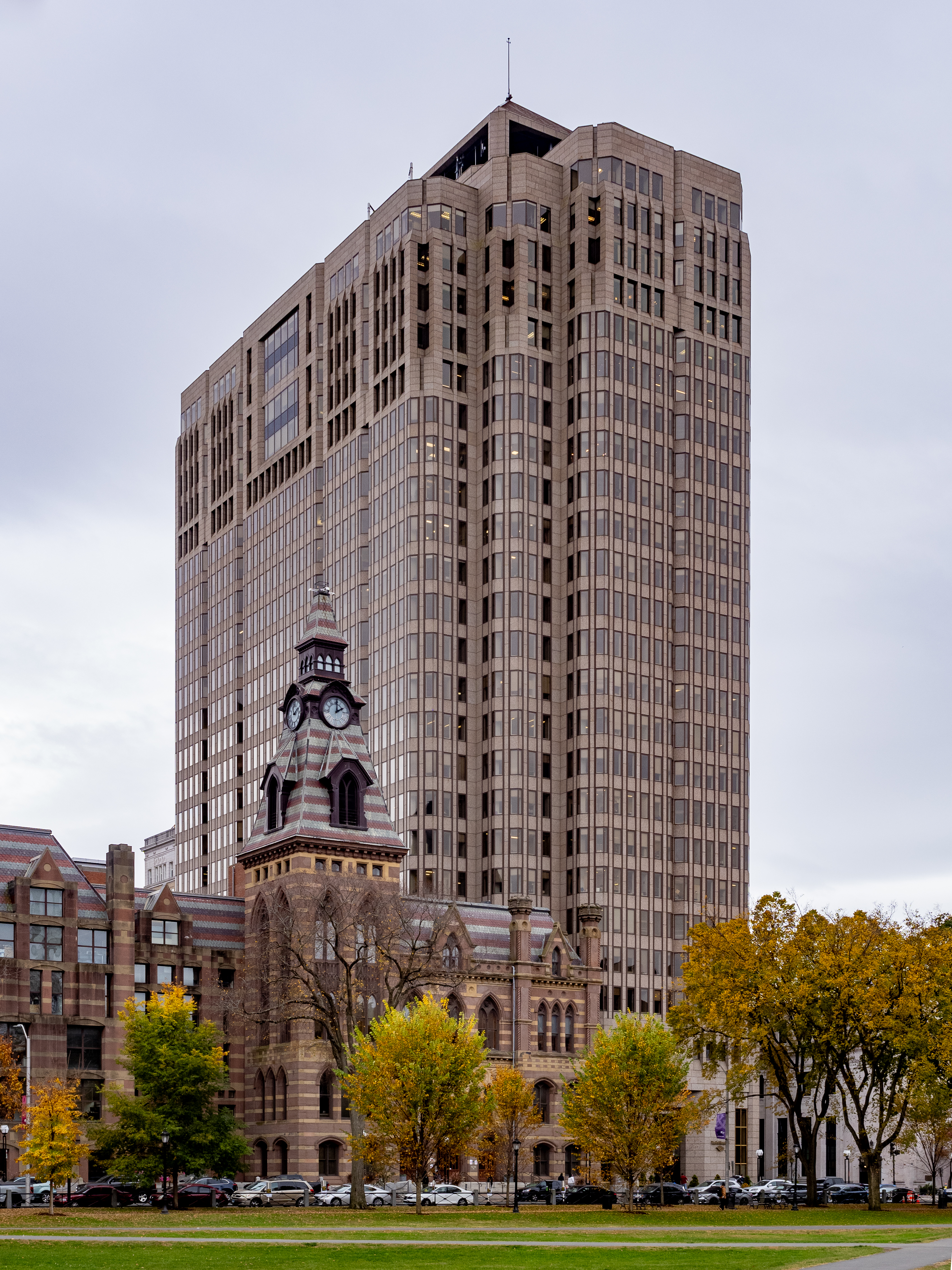
- The Connecticut Financial Center in 2024 viewed from the New Haven Green with City Hall in the foreground.
- Interactive map of the Connecticut Financial Center area

General information
- Type: Office
- Location: 157 Church Street; New Haven, Connecticut 06510-2100; United States
- Coordinates: 41.307222°N 72.923889°W
- Completed: 1990

Height
- Antenna spire: 383 ft (117 m)
- Roof: 375 ft (114 m)

Technical details
- Floor count: 26
- Floor area: 467,500 sq ft (43,430 m^{2})

The Connecticut Financial Center is the tallest building in New Haven, Connecticut, United States, and the sixth tallest building in the state. It was the first building in New Haven to be over 328 ft (100 m) tall. The 383 foot postmodern skyscraper was designed by the Toronto architectural firm Crang and Boake and completed in 1990. It is adjacent to New Haven City Hall facing the New Haven Green in Downtown New Haven. Among the current tenants of the building are United Illuminating, Bank of America, Merrill Lynch, the U.S. Attorney’s Office, U.S. Bankruptcy Court, and the Social Security Administration’s Office of Hearings and Appeals. The CFC stands on the former site of the Powell Building, which was New Haven's first skyscraper.

== See also ==
- List of tallest buildings in Connecticut
- List of tallest buildings in New Haven

Preceded by Knights of Columbus Building	Tallest Building in New Haven; 1990—Present; 117m	Succeeded by None
