= List of tallest buildings in New Haven =

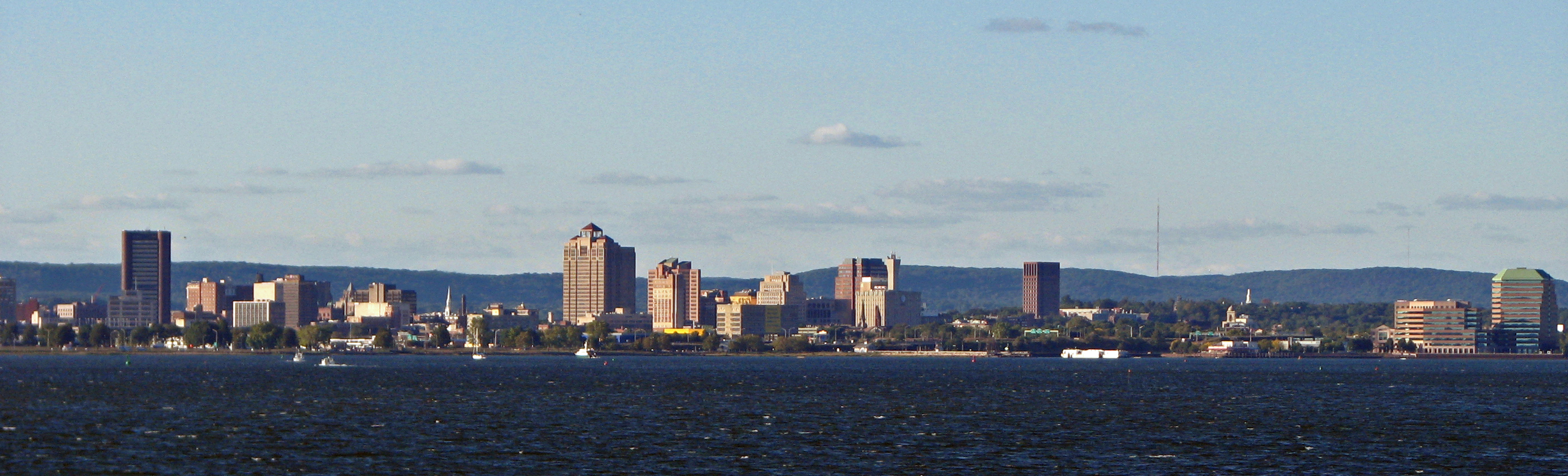
The New Haven skyline as seen from Lighthouse Point Park in 2007 before the completion of 360 State Street

New Haven is a coastal city located in the U.S. state of Connecticut. It has 84 buildings over 100 feet tall. Its tallest building is the Connecticut Financial Center which stands at 383 feet.

== Map of the tallest buildings ==
These are the locations of the 35 tallest buildings in New Haven.
- 1900s and before
- 1910s
- 1920s
- 1930s
- 1940s
- 1950s
- 1960s
- 1970s
- 1980s
- 1990s
- 2000s
- 2010s
- 2020s
1 Connecticut Financial Center
2 360 State Street
3 Knights of Columbus Building
4 One Century Tower
5 195 Church Street
6 Kline Biology Tower
7 Union and New Haven Trust Building
8 Yale New Haven Hospital Smilow Cancer Center
9 The Eli
10 St. Mary's Church
11 Crown Towers
12 Harkness Tower
13 Center Court Apartments
14 310 Orange Street
15 Long Wharf Maritime Center I
16 Swensen Tower
17 Omni New Haven Hotel
18 Tower One
19 100 College Street
20 Yale New Haven Children's Hospital
21 Payne Whitney Gymnasium
22 Bass Tower
23 101 College Street
24 Taft Apartments
25 Center Church On the Green
26 Bella Vista Building E
27 Bella Vista Building D
28 One Church Street
29 Madison Towers
30 Bella Vista Building C
31 Bella Vista Building A
32 Bella Vista Building B
33 University Towers
34 Executive Building
35 Sheffield Sterling Strathcona Hall

== Tallest buildings ==
These are the tallest buildings in New Haven, Connecticut that stand over 150 ft (46 m) tall. Spires and other architectural details are included in the height of a building, however, antennas are excluded.

Tallest building in New Haven upon completion

Rank	Name	Image	Height ft (m)	Floors	Year	Notes
1	Connecticut Financial Center	Connecticut_Financial_Center_(54106458175)	383 (117)	26	1990	Currently, the sixth-tallest building in Connecticut; fourth-tallest in the state upon completion in 1990.
2	360 State Street		338 (103)	31	2010	Second largest apartment building in Connecticut after Park Tower Stamford.
3	Knights of Columbus Building	Knights_of_Columbus_Building_(3487106693)	321 (98)	23	1969	World headquarters of the Knights of Columbus designed by Kevin Roche John Dinkeloo and Associates.
4	One Century Tower	Building in New Haven	280 (85)	19	1990	Designed by Cesar Pelli & Associates
5	195 Church Street	195_Church_Street_cropped,_New_Haven	270 (82)	18	1974	
6	Kline Tower	Kline_Biology_Tower_(54106005346)	250 (76)	16	1966	59th-tallest educational building in the world.
7	Union and New Haven Trust Building	Union_and_New_Haven_Trust_Building,_New_Haven,_Connecticut	242 (74)	12	1928	Now known as The Union
8	Yale New Haven Hospital Smilow Cancer Center	Smilow Cancer Hospital	237 (72)	13	2008	
9	The Eli (formerly the SNET Building)		232 (71)	17	1938	Listed on the National Register of Historic Places.
10	St. Mary's Church	St_marys_new_haven	230 (70)	1	1874	Tallest church in New Haven.
11	Crown Towers	Crown Towers	222 (68)	22	1967	Tallest residential building in New Haven until the completion of 360 State Street.
12	Harkness Tower	Harkness Tower	216 (66)	9	1921	Tallest clock tower in the city. Third tallest building in the Yale university campus.
13	Center Court Apartments	Building in New Haven	215 (66)	13	1916	
14	310 Orange Street	Building in New Haven	213 (65)	10	1955	
15	Long Wharf Maritime Center I	Long_Wharf_Maritime_Center_New_Haven_1	209 (63)	15	1985	
16	Swensen Tower	Swensen Tower	208 (63)	14	1932	Formerly known as The Hall of Graduate Studies.
17	Tower One	Building in New Haven	207 (63)	21	1971	Also known as the Jewish Community Council Tower.
18	100 College Street	100 College Street	205 (62)	13	2015	
19	Omni New Haven Hotel	Omni_Hotel_-_New_Haven,_Connecticut	208 (63)	19	1966	Tallest hotel in New Haven and the fourth-tallest hotel in Connecticut.
20	Yale New Haven Children’s Hospital	Yale_New_Haven_Children's_Hospital_(54106346004)	201 (61)	10	1993	
21	Payne Whitney Gymnasium	Yale_Cathedral_of_Sweat	199 (60)	16	1932	Second largest gymnasium in the world.
22	Bass Tower	MMDA-Photos_-_2019-11-08_-_Yale_Murray_College_Tower	196 (58)		2017	Part of the Pauli Murray college.
23	101 College Street	101_College_Street_New_Haven	186 (57)	10	2023	
24	Taft Apartments	Taft_Apartments_New_Haven	185 (56)	12	1911	
25	Center Church On The Green	Center_Church_on_the_Green_02	184 (56)	1	1812	Tallest of the three churches on the green. A crypt lies underneath the church.
26	Bella Vista Building E	Bella_Vista_Building_E_1	183 (55)	19	1973	Tallest building in the Bella Vista complex.
27	One Church Street	Consulate of Ecuador	183 (55)	8	1961	Houses the Consulate Of Ecuador.
28	Madison Towers	Madison_Towers_New_Haven	180 (55)	17	1963	
29	Executive Building	Gold_Building_New_Haven	167 (55)	15	1972	
30	Bella Vista Building D	Bella_Vista_Building_D_1	183 (55)	19	1973	
31	900 Chapel Street	900_Chapel_Street_New_Haven	184 (54)	13	1966	
32	Bella Vista Building C	Bella_Vista_Building_C_3	173 (52)	17	1973	
33	University Towers	York_Street,_New_Haven	170 (51)	17	1960	
34	300 George Street	300_George_Street_New_Haven_2	152 (51)	10	1960	
35	Bella Vista Building A	Bella_Vista_Building_A_2	173 (51)	17	1973	
36	Bella Vista Building B	Bella_Vista_Building_B_1	173 (51)	17	1973	
37	Lippard Laboratory of Clinical Investigation	Building in New Haven	154 (50)	11	1965	
38	Sheffield Sterling Strathcona Hall	Sheffield-Sterling-Strathcona_2	166 (50)	10	1932	
39	Yale New Haven Hospital East Pavilion	Yale_New_Haven_Hospital_(54106261403)	165 (50)	12	1953	Also referred to as 20 York Street.
40	54 Meadow Street	Building in New Haven	159 (48)	9	1946	Renovated in the late 1980s. Also referred to as the Gateway Center.
41	Anlyan Center For Medical Research And Education	Building in New Haven	158 (48)	7	2003	
42	Sterling Memorial Library	Yale_University_Library_-_Sterling_Memorial_Library_(54105136782)	157 (47)	15	1930	
43	235 Church Street	Building in New Haven (Building is actually listed as 235 Church Street, spelled 325 due to typo)	156 (47)	9	1973	Known as the New Haven County Courthouse.
44	New Haven City Hall	New_Haven_City_Hall,_October_17,_2008	152 (46)	4	1862	Listed on the National Register of Historic Places since 1975.
45	George Crawford Manor	NewHavenCT_GeorgeCrawfordManor	150 (45)	15	1966	Listed on the National Register of Historic Places since 2015.
46	Pierson Tower	Ezra_Stiles_College_and_Pierson_College	150 (45)	4	1933	Morse College Residential Tower is seen on the far left. 120 ft (36 meters) tall when excluding the spire.

== Timeline of tallest buildings ==
This lists buildings that once held the title of tallest building in New Haven, Connecticut.

Name	Image	Street address	Years as tallest	Height ft (m)	Floors
Union and New Haven Trust Building		205 Church Street	1927–1966	242 (74)	13
Kline Tower		219 Prospect Street	1966–1969	251 (76)	16
Knights of Columbus Building		One Columbus Plaza	1969–1990	322 (98)	23
Connecticut Financial Center		157 Church Street	1990–present	383 (117)	26

== See also ==
- List of tallest buildings in Hartford
- List of tallest buildings in Connecticut
