= Knights of Columbus Building (Gary, Indiana) =

- U.S. National Register of Historic Places
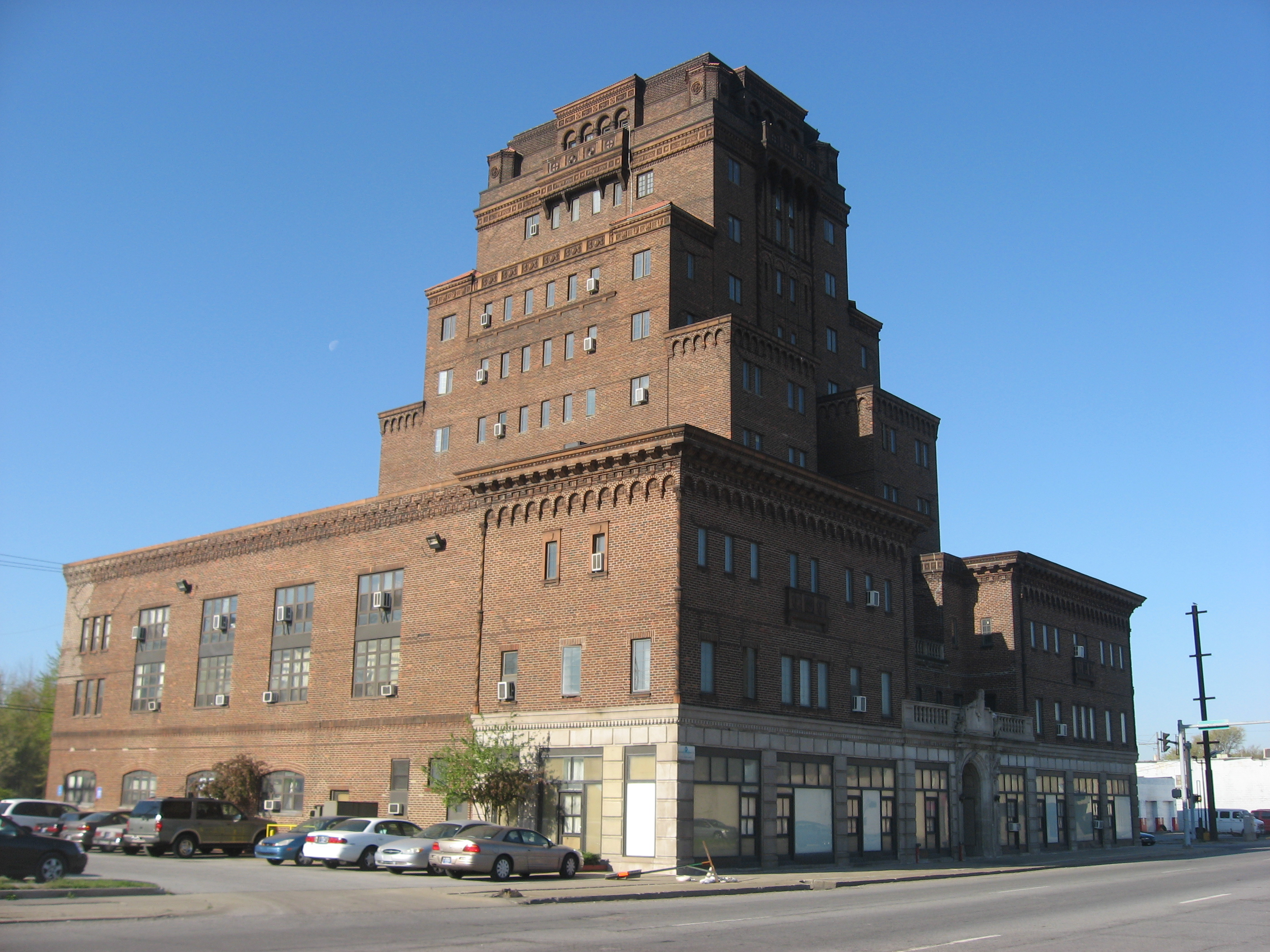
- Front and eastern side of the building

- Location within Indiana Location within the United States
- Location: 333 W. 5th Ave., Gary, Indiana
- Coordinates: 41°36′6″N 87°20′29″W
- Area: 0.3 acres (0.12 ha)
- Built: 1925
- Architect: H. L. Porter & R. McNally
- Architectural style: Setback
- NRHP reference No.: 84001065
- Added to NRHP: March 1, 1984

The Knights of Columbus Building is a historic building located at Gary, Indiana. It was built in 1925, and is a ten-story brick building that has served as a hotel, a clubhouse, a restaurant, and a sport facility.

It was listed on the National Register of Historic Places in 1984.

== See also ==
- Knights of Columbus Building (South Bend, Indiana)
- List of Knights of Columbus buildings
