= New Haven Lawn Club =

- U.S. National Register of Historic Places
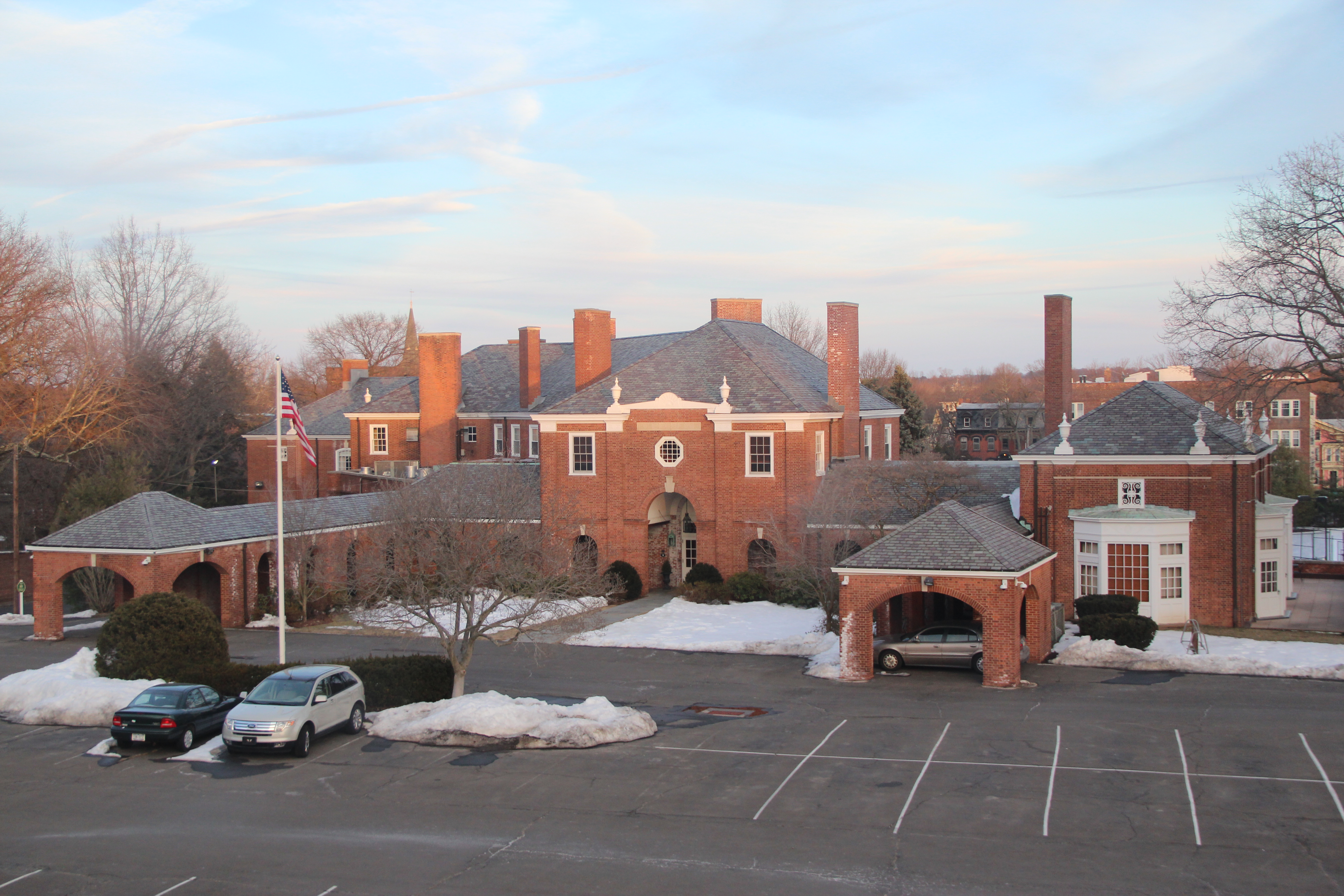

- Location within Connecticut Location within the United States
- Location: 193 Whitney Avenue; New Haven, Connecticut
- Coordinates: 41°18′57″N 72°55′10″W
- Built: 1929-1931
- Architect: Douglas Orr; William Douglas
- Architectural style: Colonial Revival, Moderne
- NRHP reference No.: 03000309
- Added to NRHP: May 1, 2003

The New Haven Lawn Club is a private social club located on Whitney Avenue in New Haven, Connecticut, close to Yale University. Founded in 1891, the club is today considered one of the most prestigious in the area. Its facilities offer tennis, squash, and outdoor swimming.

The clubhouse, built in 1931 to replace a former clubhouse that burned in 1929, is credited to architect Douglas W. Orr, but much of the detail design is by William Douglas. The architecture of the clubhouse is primarily Colonial Revival with Art Moderne decorative elements. The club was added the U.S. National Register of Historic Places in 2003. One building and one structure of the club are deemed contributing to the historic character while another building and three structures are non-contributing.

== History ==
Sign of the New Haven Lawn Club

The Club was founded in 1891 by a group of New Haven residents. After the original clubhouse was destroyed by fire in 1929, Douglas Orr designed the current facility.

It originally hosted lawn tennis, now more commonly known as court tennis, reflecting a fad brought from England.

As of 2005, more than 520 families were members.

== Activities ==
The New Haven Lawn Club offers a wide range of activities and events including tennis, swimming, food, art exhibits, concerts, book clubs, yoga and pilates. The Club is also a venue for many of New Haven's prestigious dances.

== Facilities ==
Visitors enter the foyer through a vaulted portico, archways, and columns made of the local red brick. Octagonal windows look out over the tended Lawn Club grounds. A Lalique crystal chandelier is in the foyer. Working fireplaces are found throughout the building. The New Haven Lawn Club has several event rooms.

The Grand Ballroom is the club's largest event space with a 225-person occupancy. The Ballroom has a barrel-vaulted ceiling, a performance stage, and hardwood floors. The event space includes a terrazzo entryway and fireplace.

The club's main dining room seats 120 people. Two wood-burning fireplaces mirror each other at opposite ends of the hall, with terrazzo flooring between them. Floor-to-ceiling windows offer views of the Lawn Club grounds and the attached terrace overlooks the tennis courts.

== See also ==
- National Register of Historic Places listings in New Haven, Connecticut
