= Southern New England Telephone Company Administration Building =

Skyscraper in New Haven, Connecticut

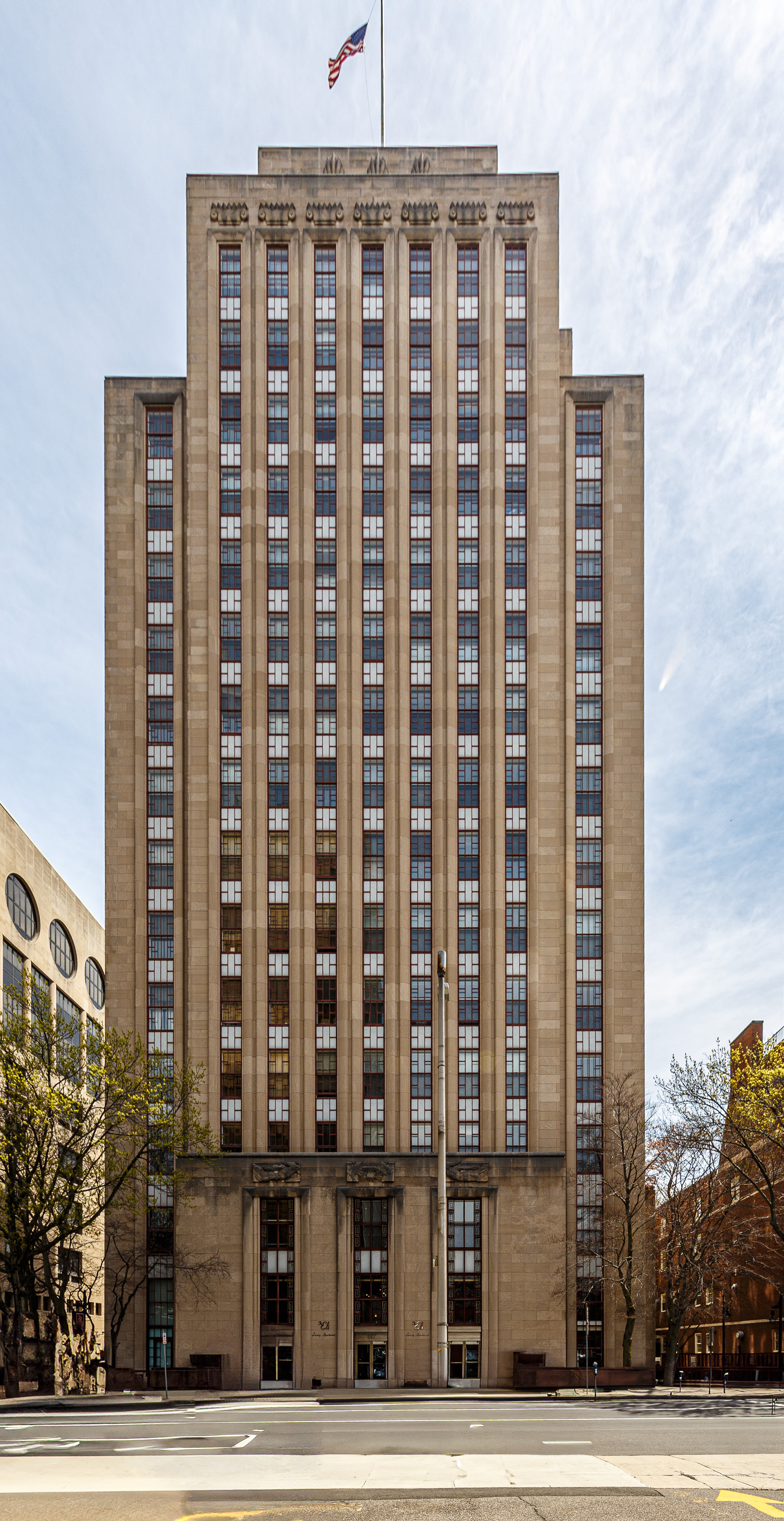

- Location within Connecticut Location within the United States
- Alternative names: The Eli

General information
- Status: Completed
- Type: Mixed-Use
- Architectural style: Art Deco
- Location: 227 Church Street; New Haven Connecticut
- Coordinates: 41°18′33″N 72°55′25″W
- Construction started: 1937
- Topped-out: 1938
- Estimated completion: 1938

Height
- Antenna spire: 230 ft (70 m)
- Roof: 196 ft (60 m)

Technical details
- Floor count: 17
- Floor area: 45,720 square metres (492,100 sq ft)

Design and construction
- Architects: Roy W. Foote, Douglas Orr
- Main contractor: Dwight Building Company
- Southern New England Telephone Company Administrative Building
- U.S. National Register of Historic Places
- NRHP reference No.: 97001447
- Added to NRHP: November 24, 1997

The Eli, formerly the Southern New England Telephone Company Administration Building, is a skyscraper at 227 Church Street in downtown New Haven, Connecticut. Completed in 1938, it is the city's finest example of Art Deco architecture, and was headquarters to the Southern New England Telephone Company (SNET), which oversaw the building of the state's telephone networks. Designed by Douglas Orr and Roy W. Foote, it was added to the National Register of Historic Places in 1997.

== Description and history ==
The Eli is located at the junction of Church and Wall Streets in downtown New Haven, one block north of the New Haven Green in the city's commercial business district. It has seventeen stories, and is built out of a steel frame whose exterior is clad mainly in Indiana limestone. A low pink granite wall delineates the property line on Church Street. It rises as a rectangular monolith for thirteen floors, with the upper stories stepped back in stages. The two street-facing facades have two-story entrance pavilions that project. The Art Deco styling includes designs and depictions related to communications, including Classical style human figures wielding lightning bolts. The interior lobby area, also two stories in height, continues these themes, and is richly finished in a variety of materials.

The former headquarters of the Southern New England Telephone Company (SNET), the Art Deco building was completed in 1938, and was the tallest building in the city until 1966 (it is currently the tenth-tallest building in New Haven's skyline). Some 1,200 SNET employees worked in the office building after its completion. The company was one of New Haven's largest employers, and was responsible for the growth of the telephone system in the entire state. Beginning in 2004, the building was converted to a luxury apartment building and rechristened "The Eli"; it now is home to 142 apartments and two storefronts.

The building is regarded as New Haven's "premier" example of Art Deco architecture, and displays one of the area's most extensive employment of Stony Creek pink granite.

== See also ==
- National Register of Historic Places listings in New Haven, Connecticut

Preceded by Union and New Haven Trust Building	Tallest Building in New Haven; 1938–1966; 60 m	Succeeded by Kline Biology Tower
