= 195 Church Street =

Skyscraper in New Haven, Connecticut

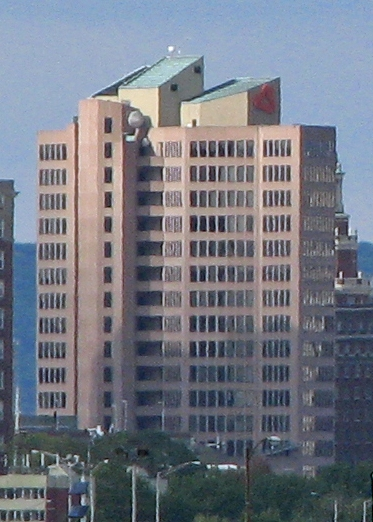
- 195 Church Street in October of 2007

- Location within Connecticut 195 Church Street (the United States)

General information
- Status: Completed
- Architectural style: Postmodern
- Coordinates: 41°18′28″N 72°55′25″W
- Completed: 1974

Height
- Roof: 270 ft (82 m)

Technical details
- Floor count: 18

Design and construction
- Architect: William Pederson

195 Church Street (Formerly the New Haven Savings Bank Tower) is a 270 ft (82 m) tall postmodern skyscraper in Downtown New Haven, Connecticut, US. It was built in 1974 and has 18 floors. At the time of its completion, it was the second tallest building in the city. As of January 2026, it is the fifth tallest building in the city. Notable tenants include KeyBank, Raymond James Financial, and SLR Consulting.

The building has a cafe on the first floor which opened in 2023, which replaced a Starbucks that closed in 2020 due to the COVID-19 pandemic.

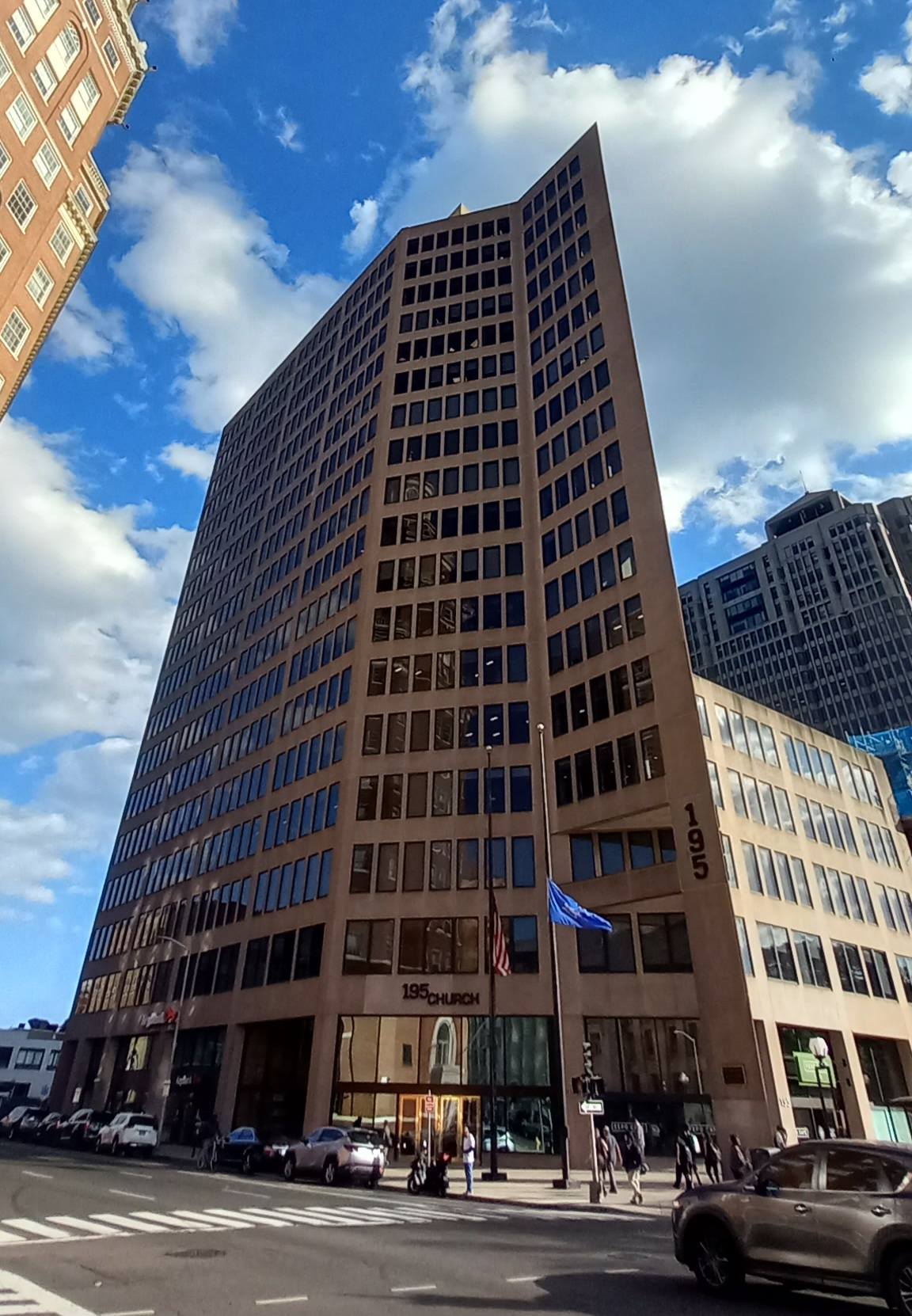
195 Church Street viewed from the corner of Elm and Church Street.

== See also ==
- List of tallest buildings in Connecticut
- List of tallest buildings in New Haven
