= Knights of Columbus Building (New Haven, Connecticut) =

Skyscraper in New Haven, Connecticut

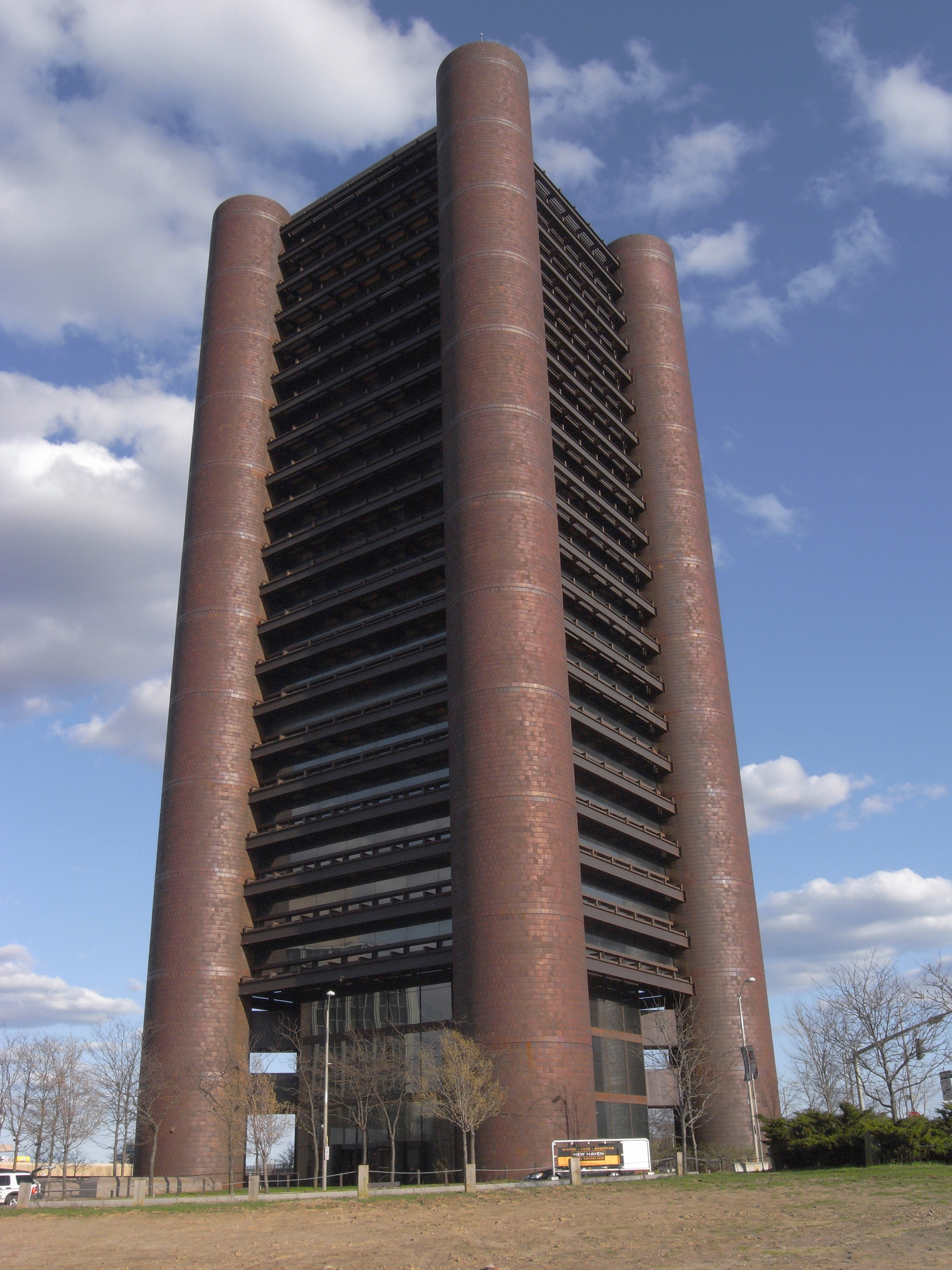
- Knights of Columbus Building, New Haven, CT.
- Interactive map of the Knights of Columbus Building area

General information
- Type: Office
- Location: One Columbus Plaza; New Haven, Connecticut 06510-2100; United States
- Coordinates: 41.3026°N 72.9274°W
- Completed: 1969
- Owner: Knights of Columbus

Height
- Roof: 321 ft (98 m)

Technical details
- Floor count: 23

Design and construction
- Architect: Kevin Roche John Dinkeloo & Associates

The Knights of Columbus Building, in Downtown New Haven, Connecticut, is the headquarters of the Roman Catholic fraternal service organization, the Knights of Columbus. Also known as the Knights of Columbus Tower or The Knights' Tower, the building was designed by Kevin Roche John Dinkeloo and Associates and finished in 1969. This 23-story modern style reinforced concrete building, at 320 feet (98 meters) tall, is the third-tallest building in the city's skyline.

The Knights' Tower serves as the international headquarters for the Knights of Columbus and is home to the Supreme Council. Led by the Supreme Knight, the chief executive officer of the Knights, the building provides administrative support and leadership for more than 15,000 councils worldwide. The cylindrical towers at the corners give the structure a simple geometric form and represent the four core principles of the Order: Charity, Unity, Fraternity, and Patriotism. Locally the building is also known as the "Tootsie Roll Building" due to its distinctive corner towers.

The building was built at 1 Columbus Plaza next to the New Haven Coliseum (razed in 2007), which was designed by the same firm.

== See also ==
- St. Mary's Church (New Haven, Connecticut)
- List of Knights of Columbus buildings

Preceded by Kline Biology Tower	Tallest Building in New Haven; 1969—1990; 98m	Succeeded by Connecticut Financial Center
