= St. Mary's Church (New Haven, Connecticut) =

St. Mary Church, New Haven, CT
- Saint Mary Parish, Roman Catholic
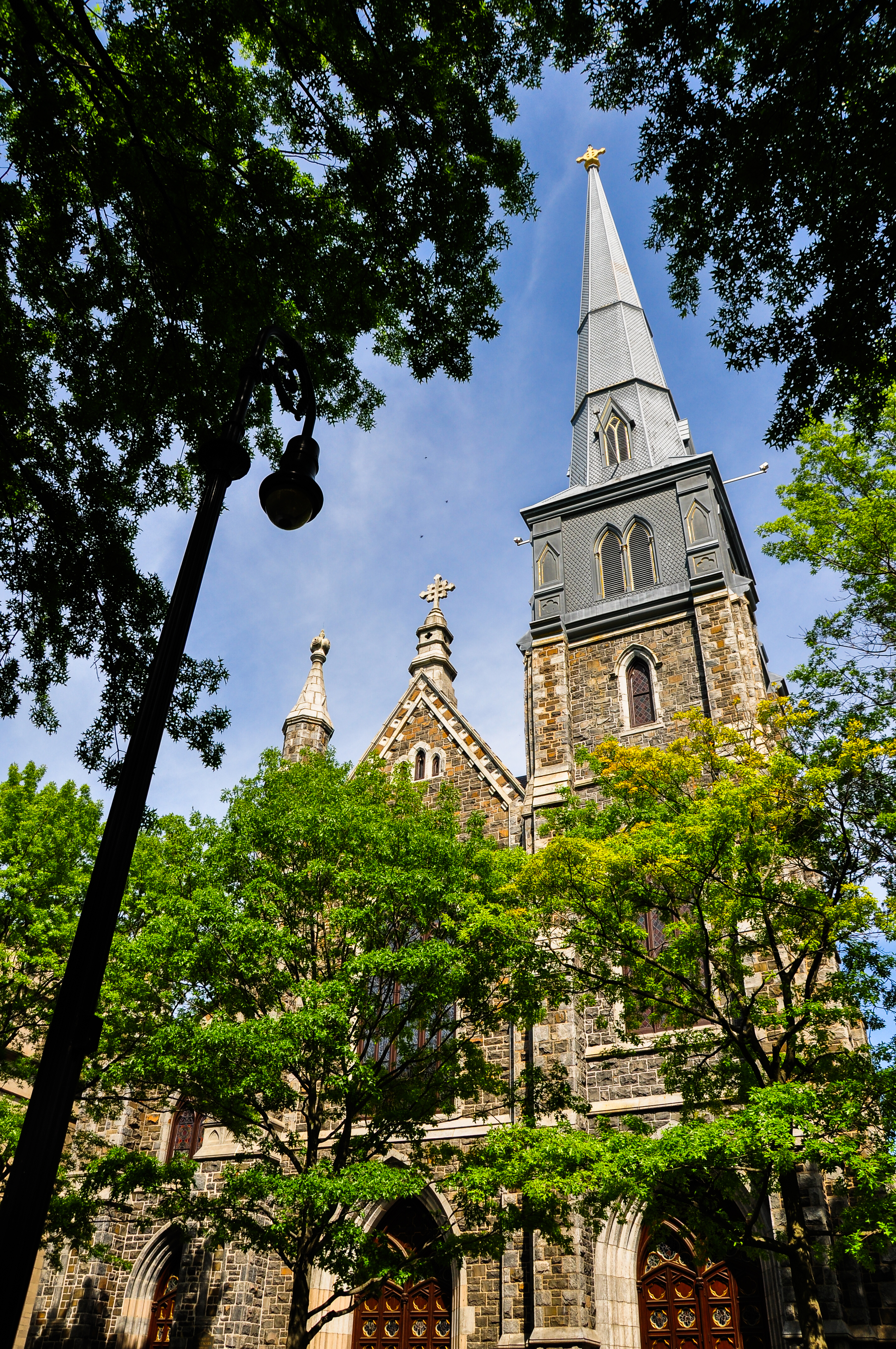
- St. Mary's Church, summer 2014.
- St. Mary Church, New Haven, CT
- 41.3119°N 72.9240°W
- Location: 5 Hillhouse Avenue; New Haven, CT
- Country: United States
- Denomination: Roman Catholic
- Website: https://newhavencatholic.org/st-mary-church/

History
- Founded: 1834-1848 (as Christ Church); 1848 (as St. Mary's)
- Dedicated: 1874 (present church)

Architecture
- Architect: James Murphy (for the 1874 church)
- Demolished: 1848 (fire in Christ Church building)

Administration
- Province: Hartford
- Diocese: Hartford
- Parish: Saint Mary, New Haven

Clergy
- Archbishop: Christopher J. Coyne
- Priest: Ryan Lerner (pastor)

St. Joseph Church, New Haven, CT
- Saint Mary Parish, Roman Catholic
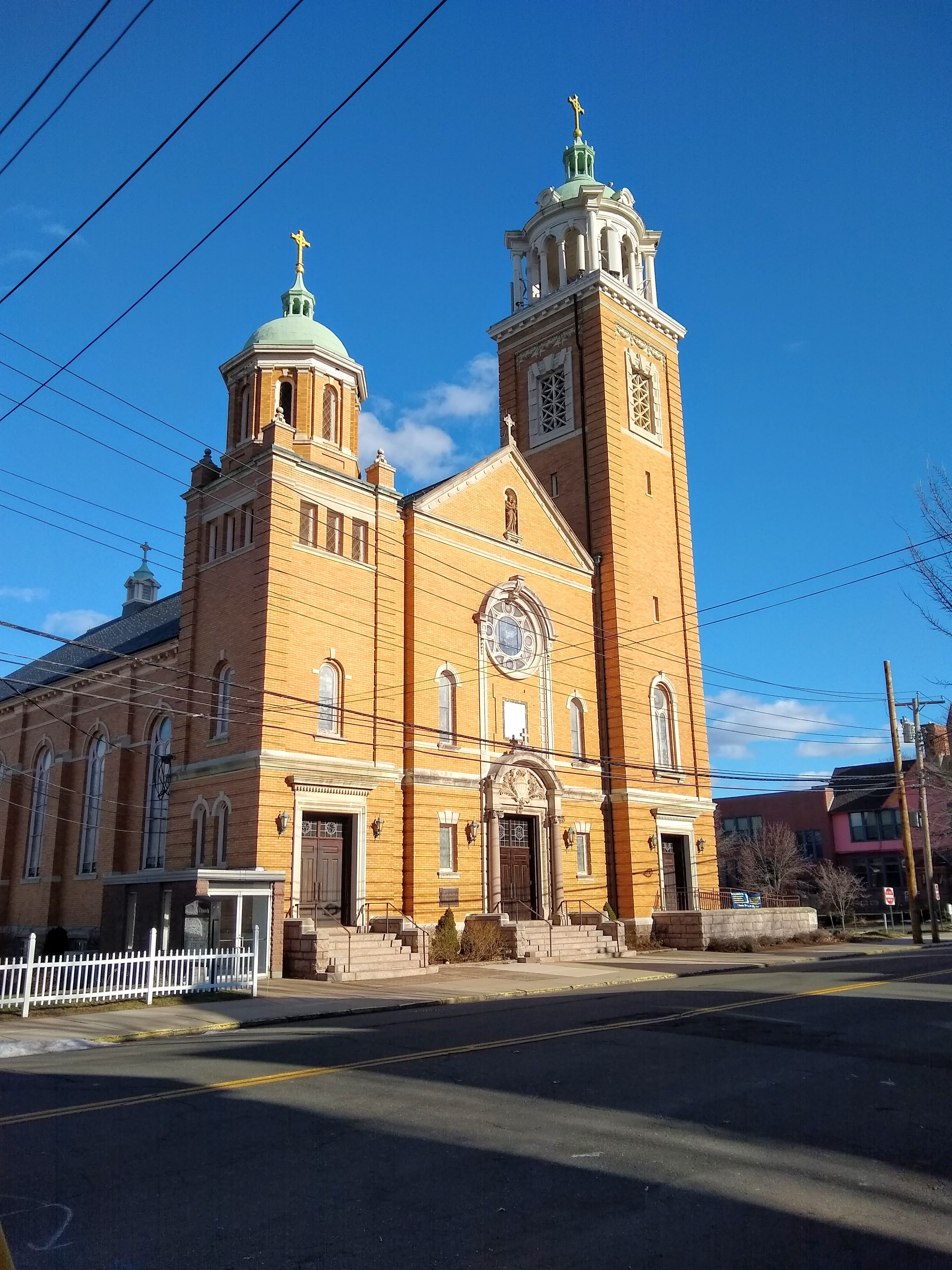
- St. Joseph Church in 2020
- St. Joseph Church, New Haven, CT
- 41°19′3.23″N 72°54′49.4″W
- Location: 129 Edward Street; New Haven, CT
- Country: United States
- Denomination: Roman Catholic

History
- Founded: 1894-1900 (as mission of St. Mary's); 1900 (independent parish); 2017 (merger with St. Mary's)
- Dedicated: 1905 (present church)

Administration
- Parish: Saint Mary, New Haven

St. Mary Church is a Roman Catholic church in New Haven, Connecticut, part of the Archdiocese of Hartford. It is the seat of the city-wide Blessed Michael McGivney Parish. As of July 1, 2023, the consolidated city-wide parish operates eight churches for regularly scheduled worship.

The parish now known as Blessed Michael McGivney Parish was the first Catholic parish erected in New Haven, and is the second oldest Roman Catholic parish in Connecticut. The parish was originally established in 1832 as Christ Church Parish, becoming Saint Mary Parish in 1848. The current Saint Mary church building, located on Hillhouse Avenue near Yale University, was dedicated in 1874. In 1882, Michael J. McGivney, the Saint Mary's assistant pastor, founded the Knights of Columbus at the parish. McGivney, whose remains are interred within the church, was beatified by Pope Francis in 2020.

For 135 years, from 1886 until their departure in December 2021, St. Mary's parish had been run by friars of the Dominican Order. In 2021, priests from the archdiocese were assigned to Saint Mary Parish as part of second major restructuring of parishes in New Haven. On July 1, 2023, all parishes within the city of New Haven were formally merged into Saint Mary Parish to form Blessed Michael McGivney Parish. In 2018, the parish of St. Mary had previously merged with nearby St. Joseph Parish as part of an earlier diocesan-wide restructuring.

The churches constituting the city-wide parish include: Saints Aeden and Brendan Church, Saint Anthony Church, Saint Francis Church, Saint Joseph Church, Saint Mary Church, Saint Michael Church (Italian), Saint Thomas Moore Chapel at Yale, Saint Martin de Porres Church, and Saint Stanislaus Church (Polish). Saint Bernadette Church, though within the city of New Haven, is part of St. Pio of Pietrelcina Parish of East Haven, Connecticut. A separate Eastern Catholic parish of Saint Michael, part of the Ukrainian Eparchy of Stamford, also exists within New Haven.

== St. Mary's ==
In the summer of 1827, Irish immigrants working the Enfield Falls Canal at Windsor Locks sent to New York for a priest to tend to one of their number who had fallen grievously ill. Vicar general John Power responded. Learning of the large number of Catholics in the area, he returned again in October. From there he went to New Haven, and having missed the boat for New York, stayed over. It being Sunday, a group of Catholics requested use of a small chapel on the Long Wharf, and being refused next resorted to a barroom. Benches were brought in and blankets hung to obscure the view while Mass was said.

On July 14, 1829, R.D. Woodley of Providence arrived from Hartford and said Mass and administered the sacraments in a barn at the corner of Chapel and Chestnut Streets, called at the time "Sliny's Corner". In August of that year, Bernard O'Cavanaugh arrived in Hartford as the first resident priest in Connecticut. He made periodic visits to New Haven, where he celebrated Mass in the house of a Mr. Newman. James Fitton from Hartford was delayed saying midnight Mass in 1831 when his horse gave out four miles from town and he had to walk the rest of the way.

In September 1832 James McDermot was assigned as assistant to Fitton at Hartford, but not long after was appointed to New Haven. This also entailed mission stations at Bridgeport, Waterbury, Derby, Norwalk, Danbury, Meriden, Middletown, Goshen, Tariffville, and other places. The congregation at New Haven numbered about 200.

=== Christ Church ===
Their Protestant neighbors were averse to doing anything to encourage "popery" and refused to allow the use of or rent and space that might be used as a gathering place. Nonetheless, a lot was secured through Jannett Driscoll, a Protestant who had married a Catholic. The small frame church was scheduled to be dedicated on the Feast of the Ascension, May 8, 1834, but just prior to the ceremony, the gallery gave way and two people were killed in the collapse. The carpenter had decided that trusses would provide sufficient support rather than the planned columns. Some days later, Benedict Fenwick of Boston blessed the building, naming it "Christ Church". In October of that year, the church was broken into and a crucifix and silver chalice stolen. Protestant members of the community presented the church with a fine silver chalice to replace the one taken.

James Smyth became pastor in 1837, and enlarged the church. It burned down on the night of June 11, 1848 and was thought to be arson. The following month Smyth was transferred to Windsor Locks, and succeeded as pastor by Philip O'Reilly. Services were held in a tent for some months, until O'Reilly purchased the Congregationalist building on church Street. The church was dedicated under the name of St. Mary, by William Tyler of Hartford on December 18, 1848.

=== Present church ===
Property on Hillhouse Avenue was secured in July 1868. Architect James Murphy of Providence, Rhode Island was commissioned to draft the plans. The construction of a Catholic church on Hillhouse Avenue was strongly opposed by the Protestant elite who lived in the area. The church was dedicated in 1874.

Since 1886, St. Mary's Church has been under the care of the Dominican friars of the Province of St. Joseph, based in New York City. The present priory building next door to the church was erected in 1907.

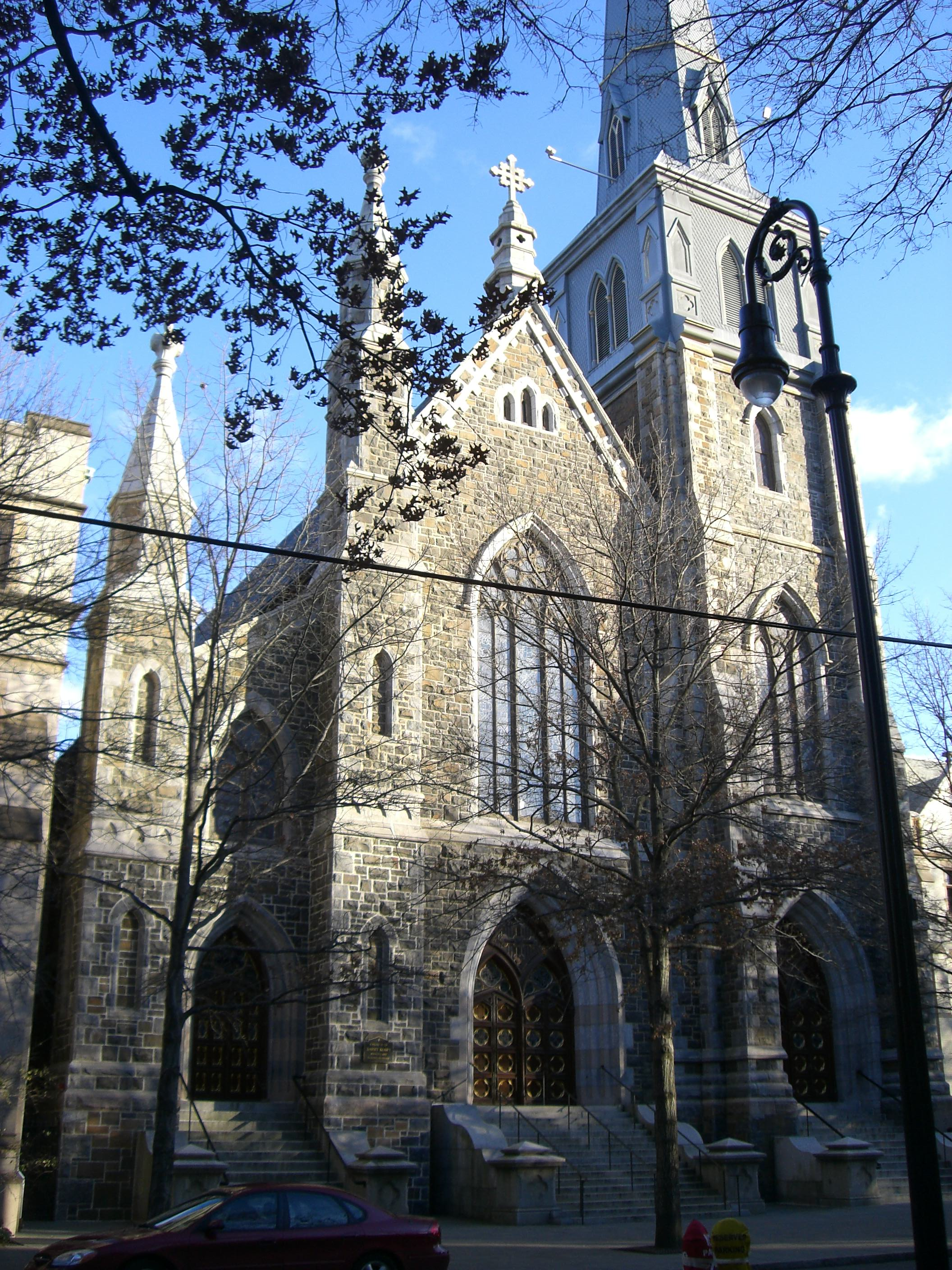
Front gable, St. Mary's in 2008

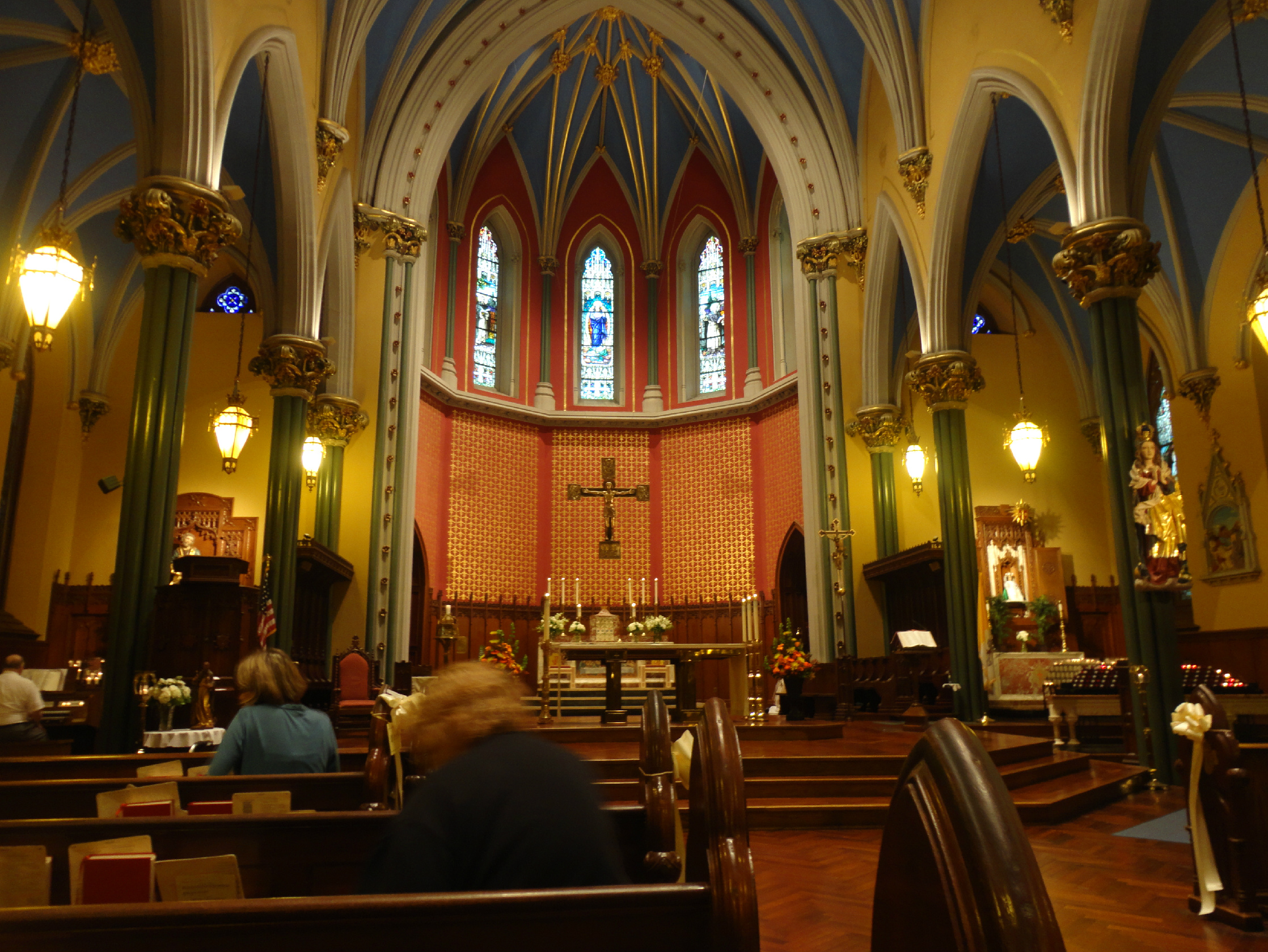
Sanctuary of St. Mary's in 2012 (prior to repairs in 2019–20)

In 1982, in recognition of the 100th Anniversary of the Knights of Columbus, the church went through a complete renovation. Although included in Murphy's original plans, the spire was never completed. The installation of the spire was part of the renovations, courtesy of the Knights of Columbus.

From February 2019 to October 2020, the St. Mary church building was temporarily closed for emergency repairs; century-old plaster had come loose and fallen from the ceiling. In addition to the plaster repairs, the John Canning Company performed extensive research into the historic decorative schemes of the church, to inform its new repainting and decoration of the interior. Their efforts included forensic removal of the outer layers of interior paint to uncover original 1800s and early 1900s stenciling details and paint colors. According to the National Catholic Register, "St. Mary's early decorations inspired all the stencil patterns for the arches, aisle walls and wainscot since the Canning crew was able to find and use those patterns exactly or modify them to work with the overall idea". Further review of archival photographs and newspaper accounts revealed circular tondo portraits of saints in each arched bay along the naive, as well as portraits of three angels above the main altar; the Canning Company recreated these tondos, working with the parish to choose a new series of modern and historic saints to be depicted. The three archangels were also depicted above the altar, reflective of increased devotion to Saint Michael according to pastor.

The church reopened in October 2020, in time for the October 31st beatification mass of Michael J. McGivney, who founded the Knights of Columbus at St. Mary's in 1882. While the beatification mass itself was celebrated at the Cathedral of Saint Joseph in Hartford, a concurrent ceremony including a live broadcast of the mass and veneration of a relic of McGivney was held at St. Mary's.

== St. Joseph's ==
St. Joseph Parish started as a mission of St. Mary's in 1894, meeting in a chapel of convenience on Lawrence Street. St. Joseph's was established as an independent parish in 1900, from territory taken in part from St. Mary's and also the parishes of St. Patrick and St. Francis, both in New Haven. The present St. Joseph church building was constructed between 1904 and 1905, and was dedicated on October 22, 1905.

Between 2010 and 2015, the number of families registered at each parish reduced significantly. After briefly sharing a pastor with St. Mary's after 2015, the two parishes were merged by decree of Archbishop Leonard Paul Blair, effective June 29, 2017, with a goal of increasing the combined parish's spiritual and financial health.

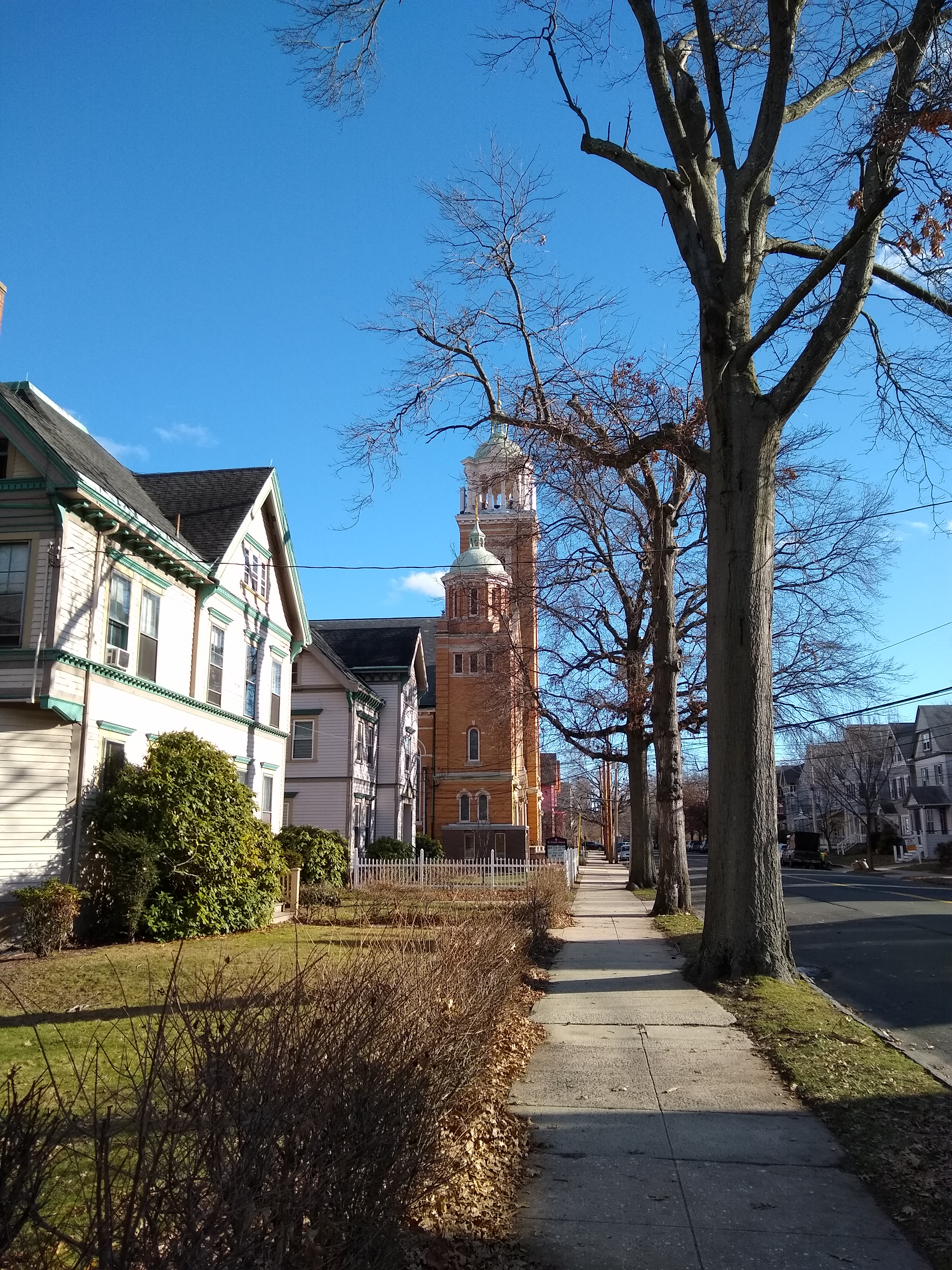
St. Joseph convent, rectory, and church buildings, looking east.

The 1904 colonial revival-style St. Joseph church building and neighboring 1885 Queen Anne-style rectory building are listed as contributing structures within the Whitney Avenue Historic District.

== Restructuring of New Haven Parishes ==
In October 2021, Archbishop Leonard Paul Blair announced a major restructuring of parishes in New Haven into a municipal model parish, whereby all 10 churches in the city would be consolidated into single parish corporation administered on the premises of St. Mary Church. In 2018, the parish of St. Mary had previously consolidated with the nearby parish of St. Joseph; both church buildings remain open for regularly schedule worship as part of the consolidated Saint Mary Parish.

As part of the reorganization, the Dominican Order left St. Mary's on December 1, 2021, and two diocesan priests were assigned to take over as pastor and parochial vicar. The newly appointed pastor of St. Mary Parish would guide the transition process and eventually become pastor of the consolidated city-wide parish. The St. Mary Priory building would house the pastor and associate priests appointed to serve the churches in New Haven.

The formal consolidation was tentatively planned to occur in 2022 or 2023; all 10 church buildings in the city were anticipated to remain open for Sunday mass in the initial phase of the consolidation. Nine of the ten church buildings remain open for regularly scheduled worship; Saint Rose of Lima Church, which had previously merged with Saint Francis Church in 2017, was closed for worship prior to the consolidation. Saint Bernadette Church in Fair Haven had previously merged with the geographically closer parishes of East Haven, Connecticut. and was thus omitted from the city-wide New Haven parish. The restructuring was formalized on July 1, 2023, merging the city parishes into Saint Mary's parish. The consolidated parish was renamed in honor of Michael J. McGivney.

== See also ==
- Michael J. McGivney
- Knights of Columbus Building (New Haven, Connecticut)
