= George A. Bartlett House =

Historic house in Nevada, United States

- U.S. National Register of Historic Places
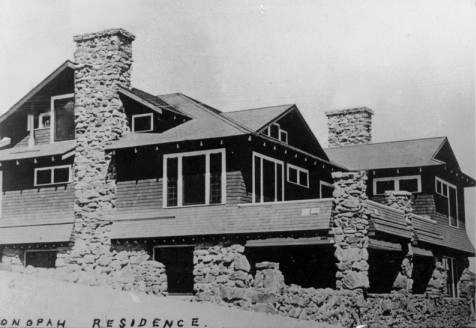

- Location within Nevada Location within the United States
- Location: McQuillan and Booker Sts., Tonopah, Nevada
- Coordinates: 38.0671°N 117.23525°W
- Built: 1907
- Architectural style: Eastern Shingle Style
- MPS: Tonopah MRA
- NRHP reference No.: 82003215
- Added to NRHP: May 20, 1982

The George A. Bartlett House, also known as the Old Knights of Columbus Hall, is a Shingle style house in Tonopah, Nevada, United States. The Shingle style is more commonly found in the northeastern United States, and is almost unknown in Nevada. The house stands on a height on Mount Brougher overlooking the town. The house was built by George A. Bartlett, later a U.S. Congressman, who lost the house in the Panic of 1907. The shingled house is set on a rubblestone foundation and features an asymmetrical plan, typical of the style. The house was used as a Knights of Columbus Hall, then abandoned. Renovation began in 2008 to restore the house for use as a bed and breakfast.

The house was listed on the National Register of Historic Places in 1982.

== See also ==
- List of Knights of Columbus buildings
- National Register of Historic Places listings in Nevada
