= Knights of Columbus Hall (Pascagoula, Mississippi) =

Historic building located in Pascagoula, Mississippi, United States

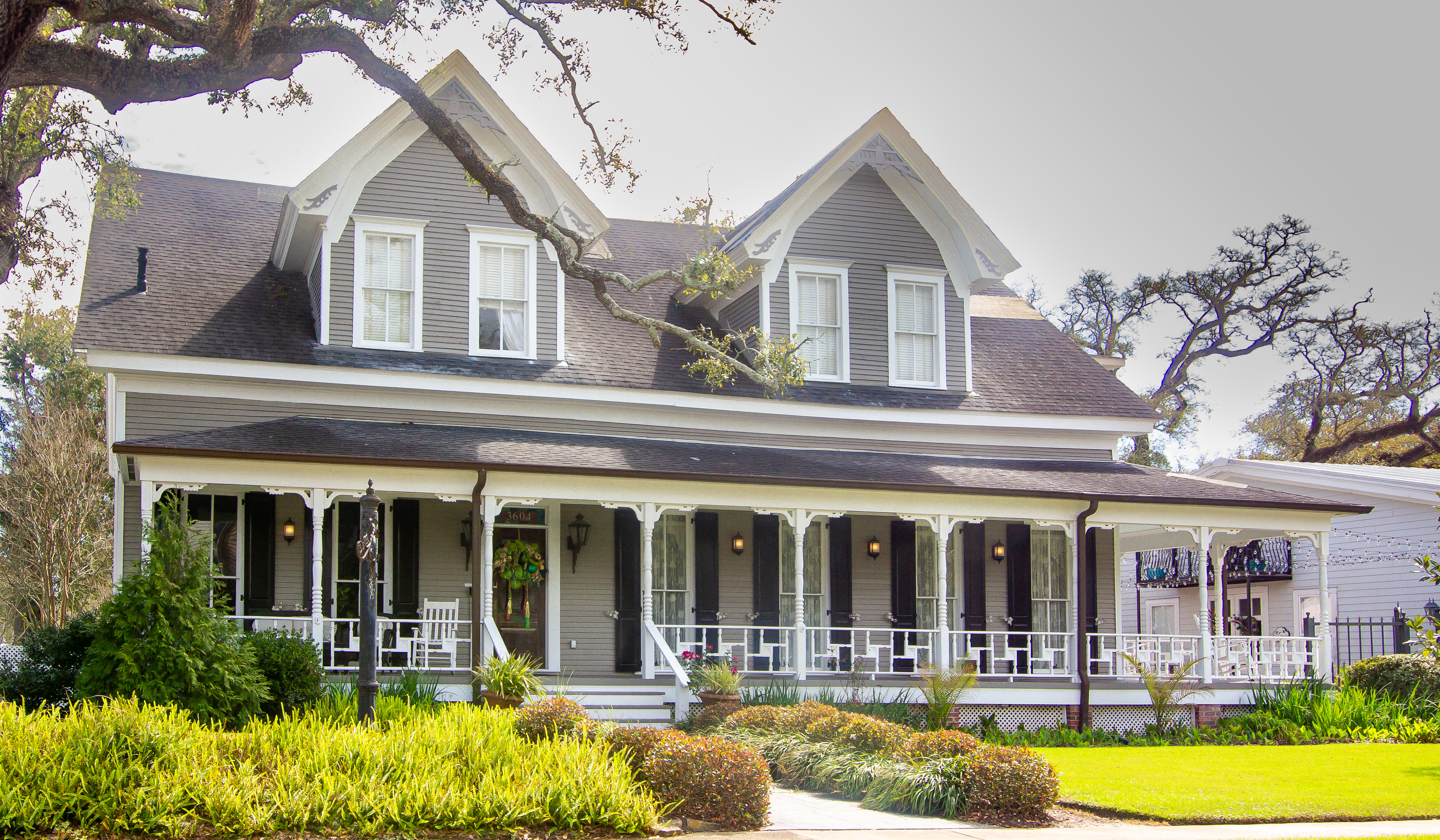

- Location within Mississippi
- 30°22′12.06″N 88°33′29.39″W
- Location: 3604 Magnolia Street, Pascagoula, Mississippi

Mississippi Landmark
- Designated: 2008

The Knights of Columbus Hall in Pascagoula, Mississippi, also known as Krebs House, is a Mississippi Landmark.

It was listed as a Mississippi Landmark in 2008.
