= Knights of Columbus-Indiana Club =

- Knights of Columbus-South Bend Indiana Club
- U.S. National Register of Historic Places
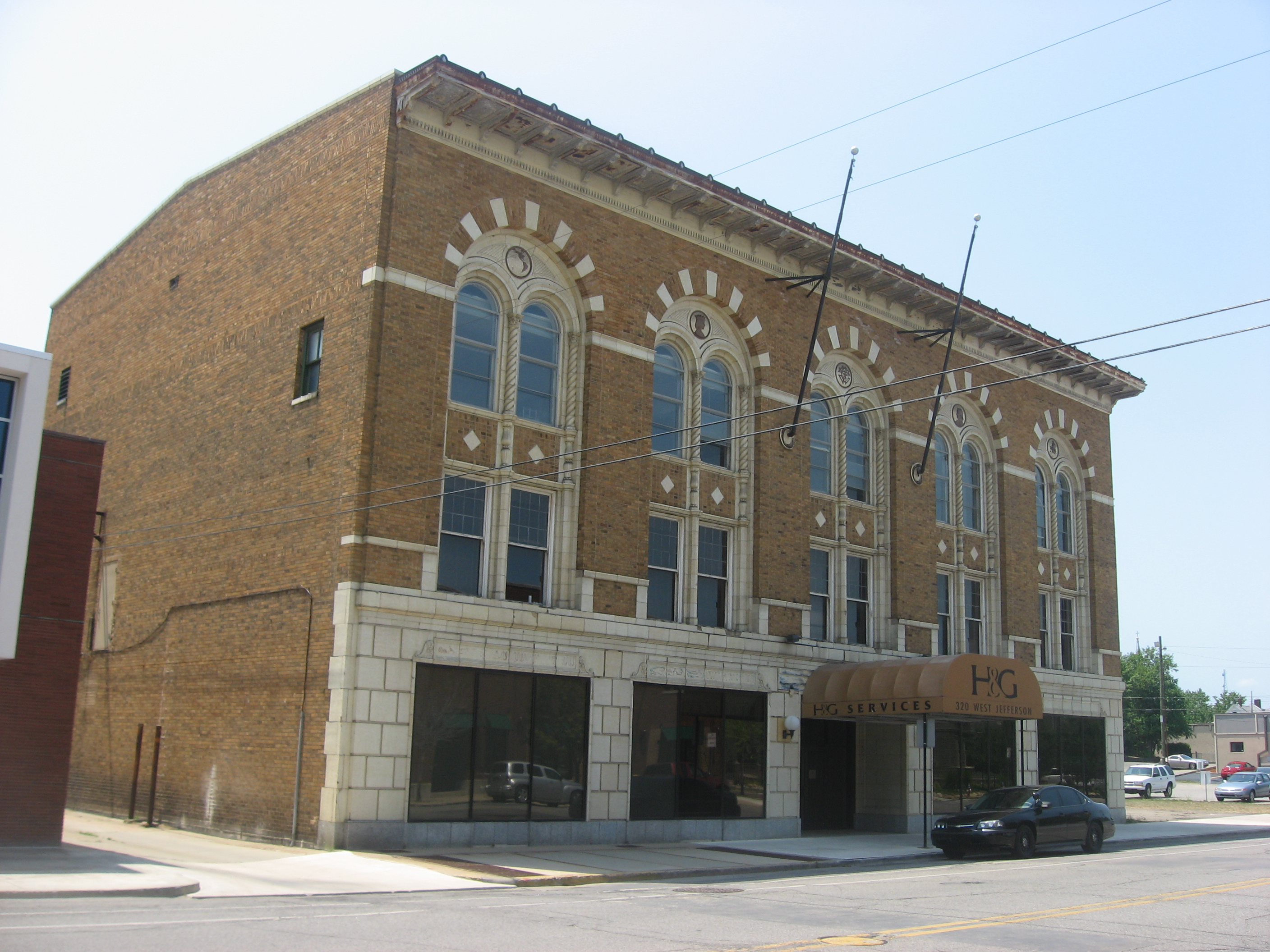
- Front and eastern side of the building

- Location within Indiana Location within the United States
- Location: 320 W. Jefferson, South Bend, Indiana
- Coordinates: 41°40′29″N 86°15′15″W
- Area: Less than 1 acre (0.40 ha)
- Built: 1924
- Architect: Nichol, Sholer, and Hoffman
- Architectural style: Renaissance, Italian Renaissance
- MPS: Downtown South Bend Historic MRA
- NRHP reference No.: 85001218
- Added to NRHP: June 5, 1985

Knights of Columbus-South Bend Indiana Club is a historic Knights of Columbus building located at South Bend, Indiana, United States. It was built in 1924, and is a three-story, Renaissance Revival style brick and terra cotta building. The building features round arched windows with radiating voussoirs of brick and terra cotta.

It was listed on the National Register of Historic Places in 1985.

== See also ==
- List of Knights of Columbus buildings
