= Dillon Building =

- U.S. National Register of Historic Places
- U.S. Historic district – Contributing property
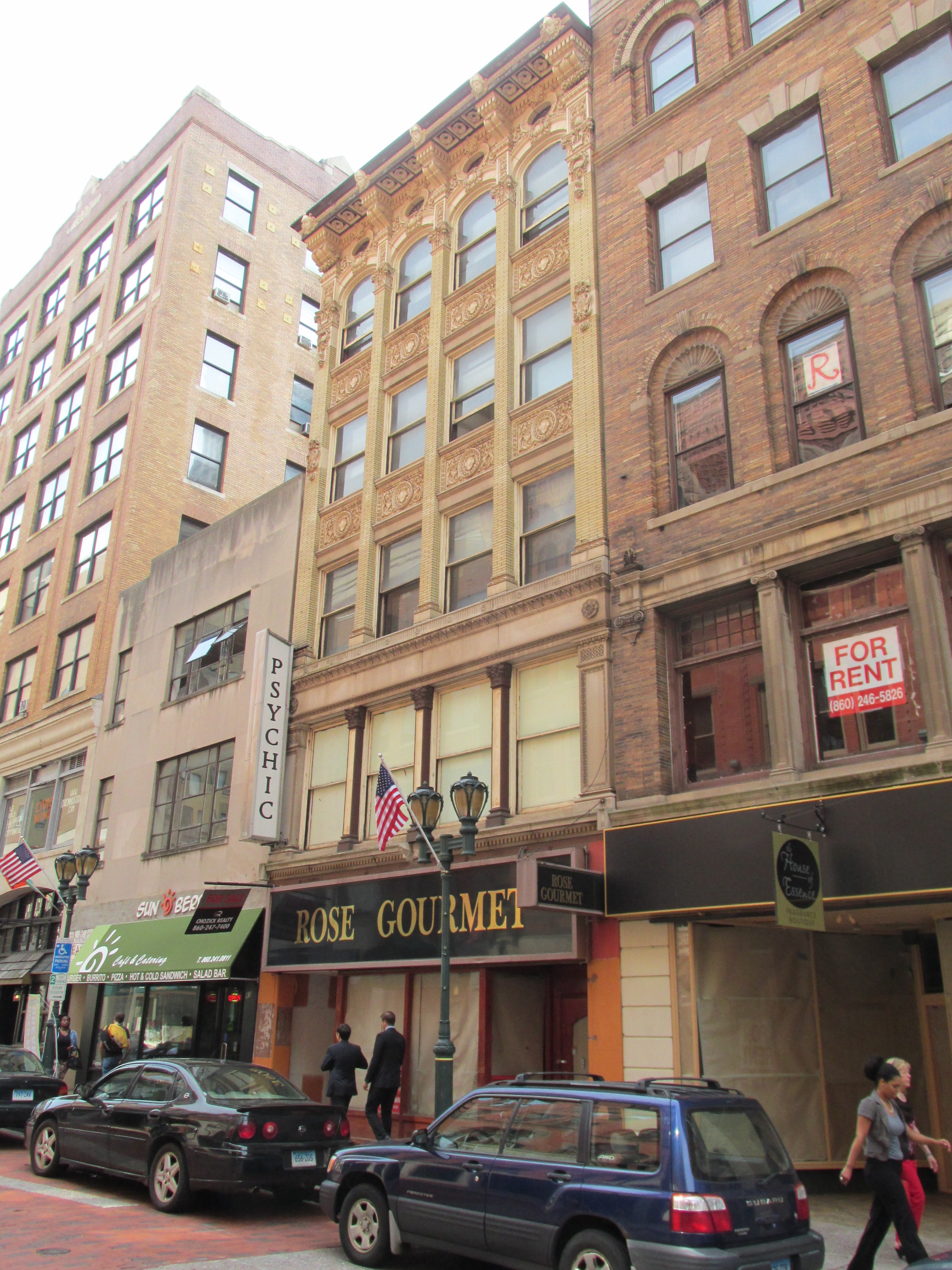

- Location within Connecticut
- Location: 69-71 Pratt Street, Hartford, Connecticut
- Coordinates: 41°46′2″N 72°40′30″W
- Area: less than one acre
- Built: 1899
- Architect: Isaac A. Allen Jr.
- Architectural style: Beaux Arts
- Part of: Pratt Street Historic District (ID83001264)
- NRHP reference No.: 82004407

Significant dates
- Added to NRHP: February 11, 1982
- Designated CP: March 10, 1983

The Dillon Building is a historic commercial building located at 69–71 Pratt Street in Downtown Hartford, Connecticut. Built in 1899, it is a good local example of Beaux Arts architecture, and its construction exemplified the transition of Pratt Street from a residential to commercial area. The building was listed on the National Register of Historic Places on February 11, 1982.

== Description and history ==
The Dillon Building is located roughly midway between Trumbull and Main Streets on the south side of Pratt Street. It is a five-story masonry building, built with brick load-bearing walls, limestone trim, and a wooden frame. It shares party walls with a taller building on the right, and a shorter one on the left. Its front facade is four bays wide, with a single store front flanked by recessed entrances on either side, one providing entry to the store, and the other to the upstairs. The second floor windows are articulated by cast iron pilasters finished to resemble stone, and an entablature and band of dentil stonework separate it from the upper floors. The upper floors are articulate by full-height pilasters, which rise to elaborate brackets at the cornice. Windows on the third and fourth floors are rectangular, while the top floor windows are set in segmental arch openings.

Prior to construction of this building, the lot on which it stands was occupied by one half of a two-story brick residential duplex, probably built in the 1840s. Commercial growth in the city during the second half of the 19th century placed development pressure on residential streets like Pratt Street that abutted Main Street. Charles Dillon, a Main Street merchant and milliner, purchased the west side of the duplex in 1898. When the building was completed the following year, it and the neighboring half-duplex epitomized the transition of the street from a residential to commercial area. The probable architect of the building was Isaac A. Allen Jr., who had previously done work for Dillon, and worked in a practice that had previously designed buildings with a similar upper floor plan.

== See also ==
- National Register of Historic Places listings in Hartford, Connecticut
