= Pratt Street Historic District =

Historic district in Connecticut, United States

- U.S. National Register of Historic Places
- U.S. Historic district
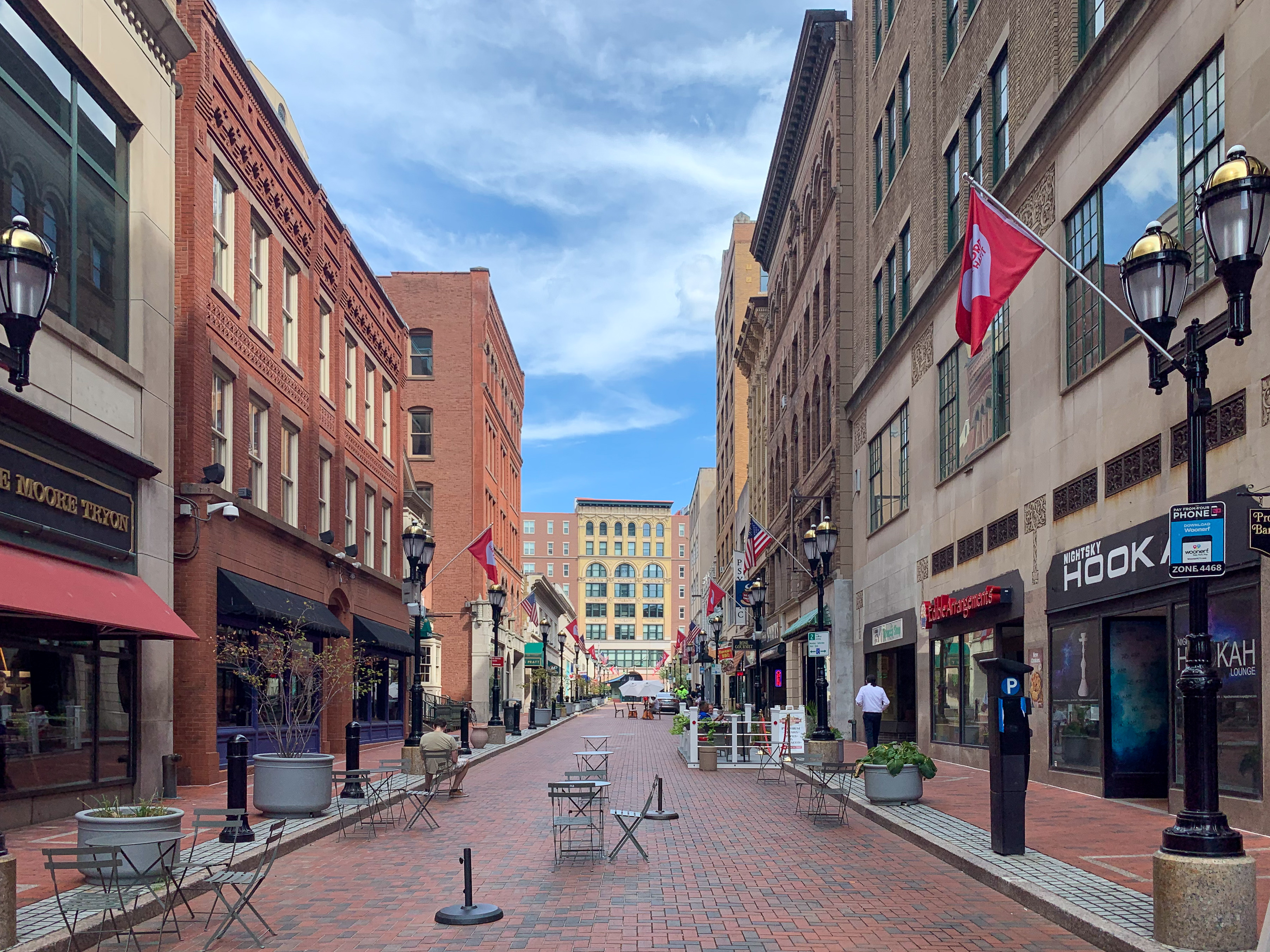
- Looking down pedestrianized Pratt Street toward Main Street, 2020

- Location within Connecticut Location within the United States
- Location: 31-101 and 32-110 Pratt Street; 196-260 Trumbell Street, Hartford, Connecticut
- Coordinates: 41°46′4″N 72°40′30″W
- Area: 3 acres (1.2 ha)
- Architect: Multiple
- Architectural style: Late 19th And Early 20th Century American Movements, Classical Revival, Romanesque
- Website: prattst.com
- NRHP reference No.: 83001264
- Added to NRHP: March 10, 1983

The Pratt Street Historic District of Hartford, Connecticut, encompasses all of Pratt Street, between Main and Trumbull Streets, in the City's Downtown. This block, which includes 15 buildings (one of which faces Trumbull Street), is the only place in the city where its typical Early 20th-Century Streetscape is retained. All of the buildings in the district were built between 1830 and 1928, a significant number of them designed by major local architects. The district was listed on the National Register of Historic Places in 1983.

== Description and history ==
Contributing properties

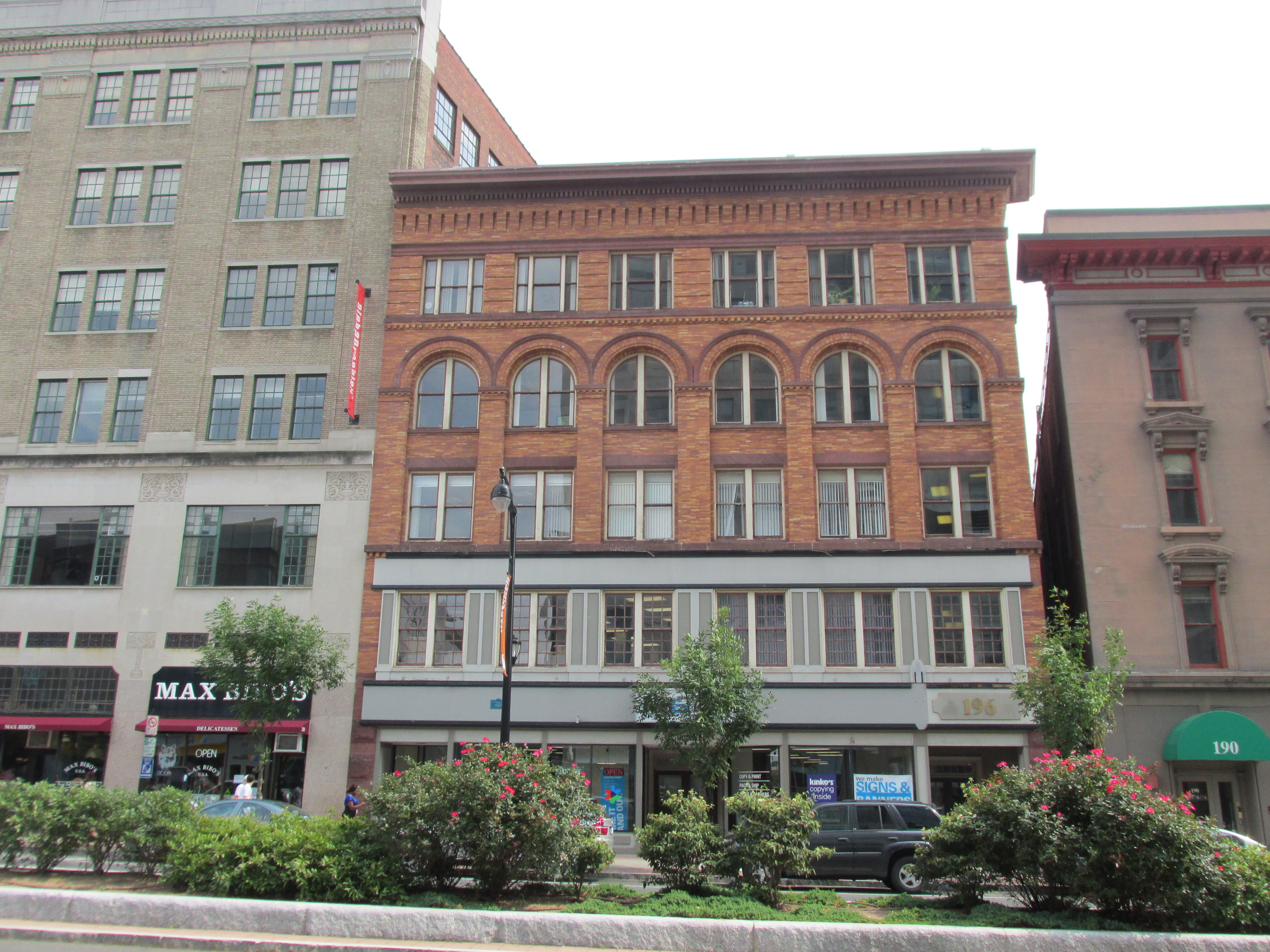
Heublein Building at 196-200 Trumbull Street (1896)

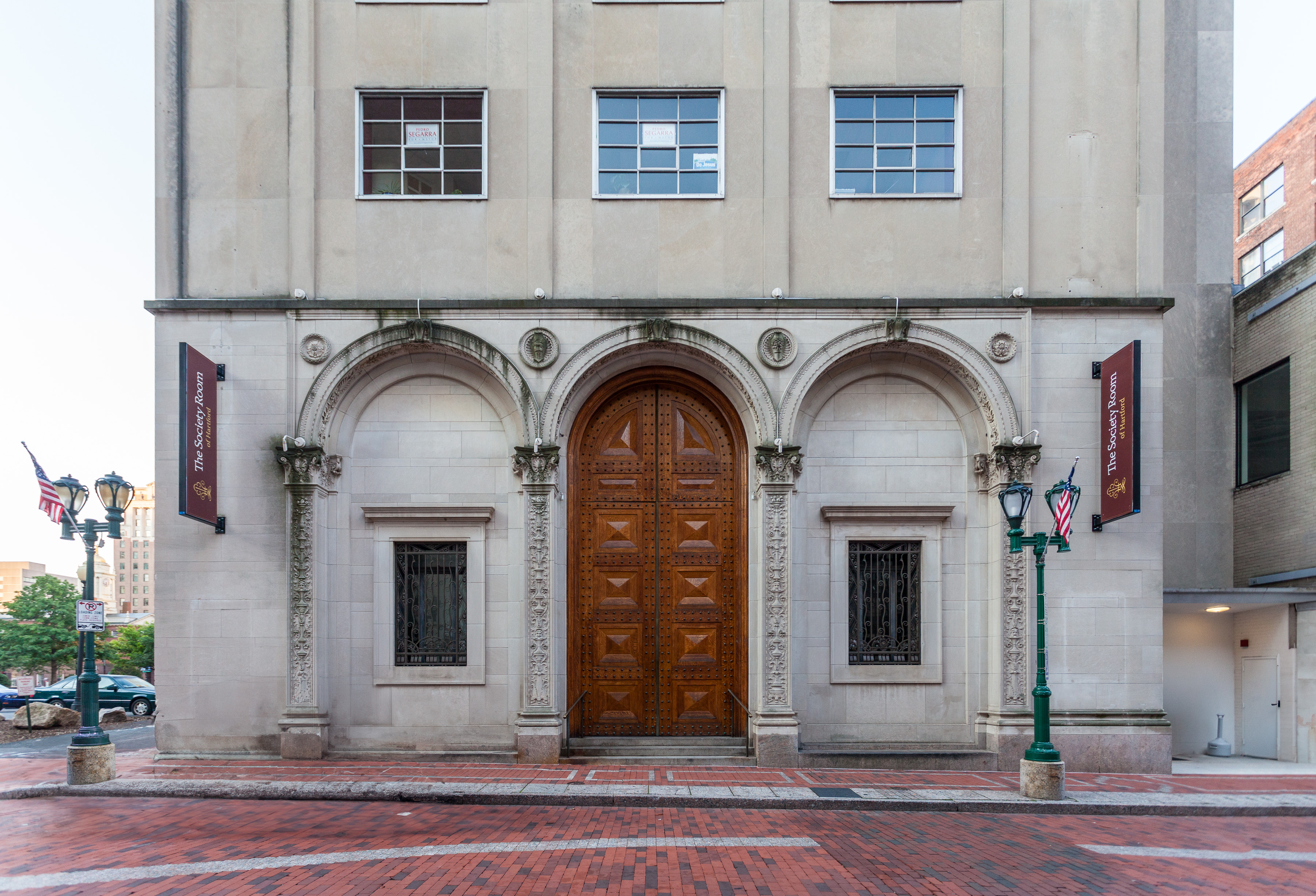
Former Society for Savings building at 31 Pratt Street (1893)

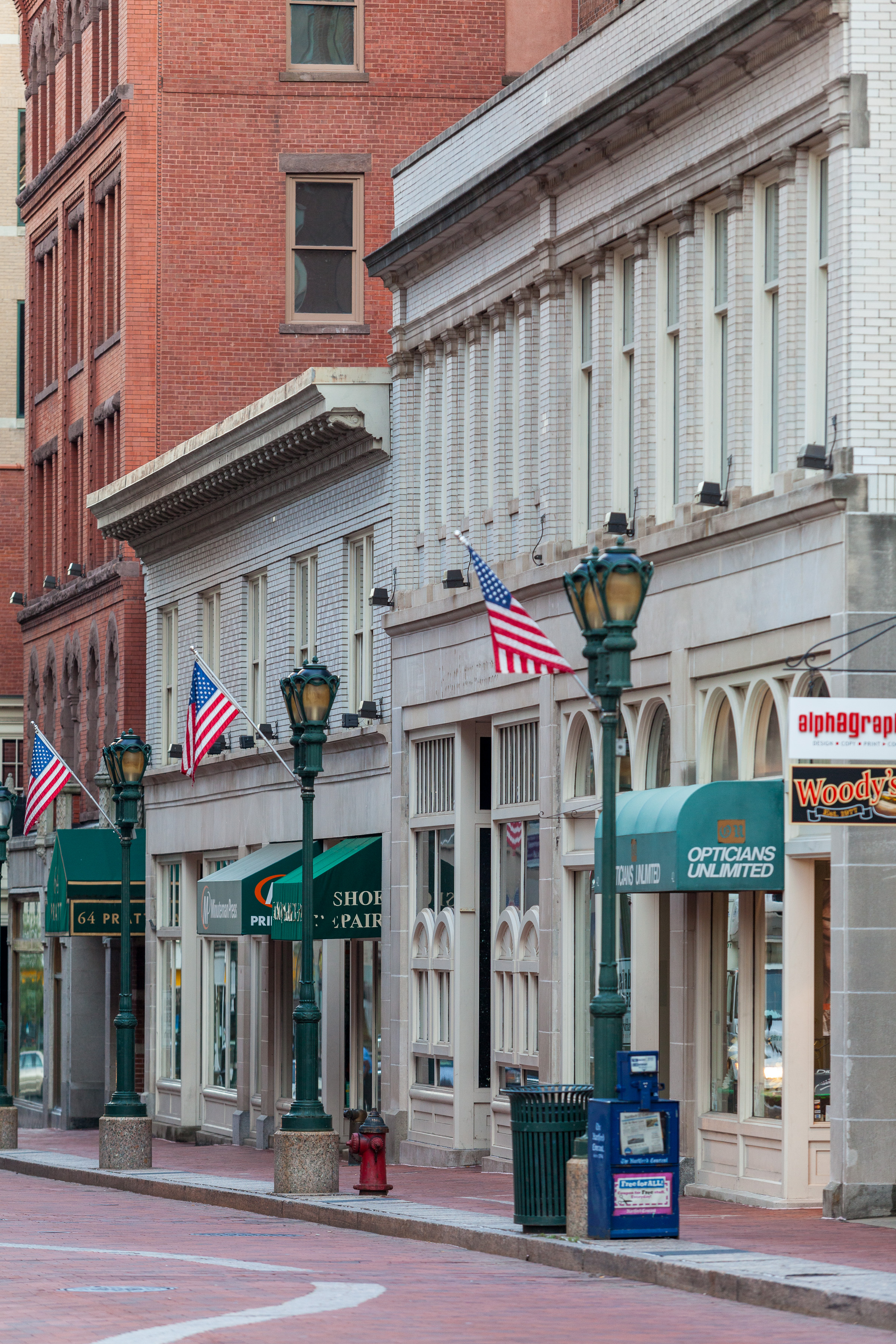
North side of Pratt Street

Pratt Street is a one-block street in Downtown Hartford, running East-West between Main Street on the East and Trumbull Street (across from the PeoplesBank Arena) in the West. It is lined by fifteen buildings (eight on one side and seven on the other) that are distinctly more modest in scale than those on the surrounding streets, ranging in height from two to six stories. All but one were built between 1896 and 1937, and are in commercial revival styles popular in that period. The one exception is the 1830 Spencer House at 76-78 Pratt Street, a two-story brick townhouse that is a reminder of the street's residential origin.

Anchoring the Southeast Corner of Pratt and Trumbull is the Steiger Building, a six-story building with its lower stories faced in smooth stone, and its upper floors finished in light brick. Just to its south on Trumbull is the Heublein Building, a Romanesque Revival structure built out of red brick and brownstone in 1896. To the East of the Steiger Building on Pratt Street is a Classical Revival structure five stories in height, built in 1897. Adjacent to it is the Dillon Building, one of Hartford's finest examples of Beaux Arts architecture, built in 1899 and attributed to architect Isaac Allen Jr. Allen is also credited with the building three to the east, a two-story building built in 1919 which exhibits extensive terra cotta detailing and expansive use of glass. The 1893 Society for Savings Building anchors the eastern end of the street; its original architect was George H. Gilbert, but it has undergone several restylings (most notably in 1926-27 by Dennison and Hirons) to acquire a more International appearance.

Pratt Street became pedestrian-only in 2020. The intention was to attract foot traffic to downtown and for Pratt Street to become a center of activity in the city.

== See also ==
- National Register of Historic Places listings in Hartford, Connecticut
